= Cteno =

Cteno may refer to:

== Animals ==
=== Aquatic Animals ===
==== Corals ====
- Ctenocella - Genus of cnidarian
- Ctenocella lyra - Species of cnidarian
- Ctenocella ochracea - Species of cnidarian
- Ctenocella pectinata - Species of cnidarian
- Ctenocella ramosa - Species of cnidarian

==== Fishes ====
- Ctenochaetus - Genus of fishes
- Ctenochaetus binotatus - Species of fish
- Ctenochaetus cyanocheilus - Species of fish
- Ctenochaetus flavicauda - Species of fish
- Ctenochaetus hawaiiensis - Species of fish
- Ctenochaetus marginatus - Species of fish
- Ctenochaetus striatus - Species of fish
- Ctenochaetus strigosus - Species of fish
- Ctenochaetus tominiensis - Species of fish
- Ctenochaetus truncatus - Species of fish
- Ctenocheirodon - Genus of fishes
- Ctenochirichthys - Genus of fishes
- Ctenoluciidae - Family of fishes
- Ctenolucius beani - Species of fish
- Ctenolucius hujeta - Species of fish
- Ctenosciaena - Genus of fishes

==== Others ====
- Ctenophora - Phylum of marine invertebrate animals

=== Land Animals ===
==== Lizards ====
- Ctenosaura - Genus of lizards
- Ctenosaura acanthura - Species of lizard
- Ctenosaura bakeri - Species of lizard
- Ctenosaura clarki - Species of lizard
- Ctenosaura conspicuosa - Species of lizard
- Ctenosaura flavidorsalis - Species of lizard
- Ctenosaura hemilopha - Species of lizard
- Ctenosaura macrolopha - Species of lizard
- Ctenosaura melanosterna - Species of lizard
- Ctenosaura nolascensis - Species of lizard
- Ctenosaura oaxacana - Species of lizard
- Ctenosaura oedirhina - Species of lizard
- Ctenosaura palearis - Species of lizard
- Ctenosaura pectinata - Species of lizard
- Ctenosaura quinquecarinata - Species of lizard
- Ctenosaura similis - Species of lizard
- Ctenophorus - Genus of lizards
- Ctenophorus adelaidensis - Species of lizard
- Ctenophorus butlerorum - Species of lizard
- Ctenophorus caudicinctus - Species of lizard
- Ctenophorus chapmani - Species of lizard
- Ctenophorus clayi - Species of lizard
- Ctenophorus cristatus - Species of lizard
- Ctenophorus decresii - Species of lizard
- Ctenophorus femoralis - Species of lizard
- Ctenophorus fionni - Species of lizard
- Ctenophorus fordi - Species of lizard
- Ctenophorus gibba - Species of lizard
- Ctenophorus graafi - Species of lizard
- Ctenophorus infans - Species of lizard
- Ctenophorus isolepis - Species of lizard
- Ctenophorus maculatus - Species of lizard
- Ctenophorus maculosus - Species of lizard
- Ctenophorus mckenziei - Species of lizard
- Ctenophorus mirrityana - Species of lizard
- Ctenophorus modestus - Species of lizard
- Ctenophorus nguyarna - Species of lizard
- Ctenophorus nuchalis - Species of lizard
- Ctenophorus ornatus - Species of lizard
- Ctenophorus parviceps - Species of lizard
- Ctenophorus pictus - Species of lizard
- Ctenophorus reticulatus - Species of lizard
- Ctenophorus rubens - Species of lizard
- Ctenophorus rufescens - Species of lizard
- Ctenophorus salinarum - Species of lizard
- Ctenophorus scutulatus - Species of lizard
- Ctenophorus slateri - Species of lizard
- Ctenophorus spinodomus - Species of lizard
- Ctenophorus tjantjalka - Species of lizard
- Ctenophorus tjantjalka - Species of lizard
- Ctenophorus yinnietharra - Species of lizard

==== Moths ====
- Ctenoplusia - Genus of moth
- Ctenoplusia accentifera - Species of moth
- Ctenoplusia adiaphora - Species of moth
- Ctenoplusia aeneofusa - Species of moth
- Ctenoplusia albostriata - Species of moth
- Ctenoplusia calceolaris - Species of moth
- Ctenoplusia camptogamma - Species of moth
- Ctenoplusia dorfmeisteri - Species of moth
- Ctenoplusia fracta - Species of moth
- Ctenoplusia furcifera - Species of moth
- Ctenoplusia gammaloba - Species of moth
- Ctenoplusia limbirena - Species of moth
- Ctenoplusia orbifer - Species of moth
- Ctenoplusia oxygramma - Species of moth
- Ctenoplusia vittata - Species of moth

==== Flies ====
- Ctenophora (fly) - Genus of flies
- Ctenophora apicata - Species of fly
- Ctenophora elegans - Species of fly
- Ctenophora festiva - Species of fly
- Ctenophora nubecula - Species of fly
- Ctenophora ornata - Species of fly

==== Insects ====
- Ctenolepisma - Genus of silverfish
- Ctenolepisma algharbicum - Species of silverfish
- Ctenolepisma almeriense - Species of silverfish
- Ctenolepisma ciliatum - Species of silverfish
- Ctenolepisma dubitale - Species of silverfish
- Ctenolepisma electrans - Species of silverfish
- Ctenolepisma guadianicum - Species of silverfish
- Ctenolepisma guanche - Species of silverfish
- Ctenolepisma hummelincki - Species of silverfish
- Ctenolepisma insulicola - Species of silverfish
- Ctenolepisma lineatum - Species of silverfish
- Ctenolepisma longicaudatum - Species of silverfish
- Ctenolepisma rothschildi - Species of silverfish
- Ctenolepisma tanzanicum - Species of silverfish
- Ctenolepisma targionianum - Species of silverfish
- Ctenolepisma targionii - Species of silverfish
- Ctenolepisma terebrans - Species of silverfish
- Ctenolepisma versluysi - Species of silverfish
- Ctenolepisma vieirai - Species of silverfish

==== Others ====
- Ctenobethylus - Genus of ants

== See also ==
- Melaleuca ctenoides - Species of shrub
- Cena (disambiguation) - Similar spelling
- Credo (disambiguation) - Similar spelling
- Chemo (disambiguation) - Similar spelling
