= Silverfish (disambiguation) =

A silverfish (most notably, the common species, Lepisma saccharinum) is a wingless insect in the order Zygentoma. The same name can be applied to many species in the order as a whole, which comprises the families Lepismatidae, Nicoletiidae, Lepidotrichidae, Maindroniidae and Protrinemuridae.

Silverfish may also refer to:

== Animals ==
=== Other individual insect species ===
- Several other species also in the order Zygentoma, including:
  - Ctenolepisma lineata, or four-lined silverfish
  - Ctenolepisma longicaudata, or grey silverfish

=== Fish ===
Silver fish (fish); several species with the common name "silver fish"

== Other uses ==
- Silverfish (video game), 2010 video game
- Silver Fish Award, a Girl Guide award
- Phil Silverfish, a character in the animated TV series Bump in the Night
- Silverfish (band), a British indie band
- Silverfish, a graphic novel by David Lapham
- Silver Fish (or Silberfische), a nickname for Auto Union racing cars
- "The Silver Fish", a nickname of snooker player Silvino Francisco
- Silverfish, a song by Corey Taylor from CMFT

== See also ==
- Goldfish (disambiguation)
