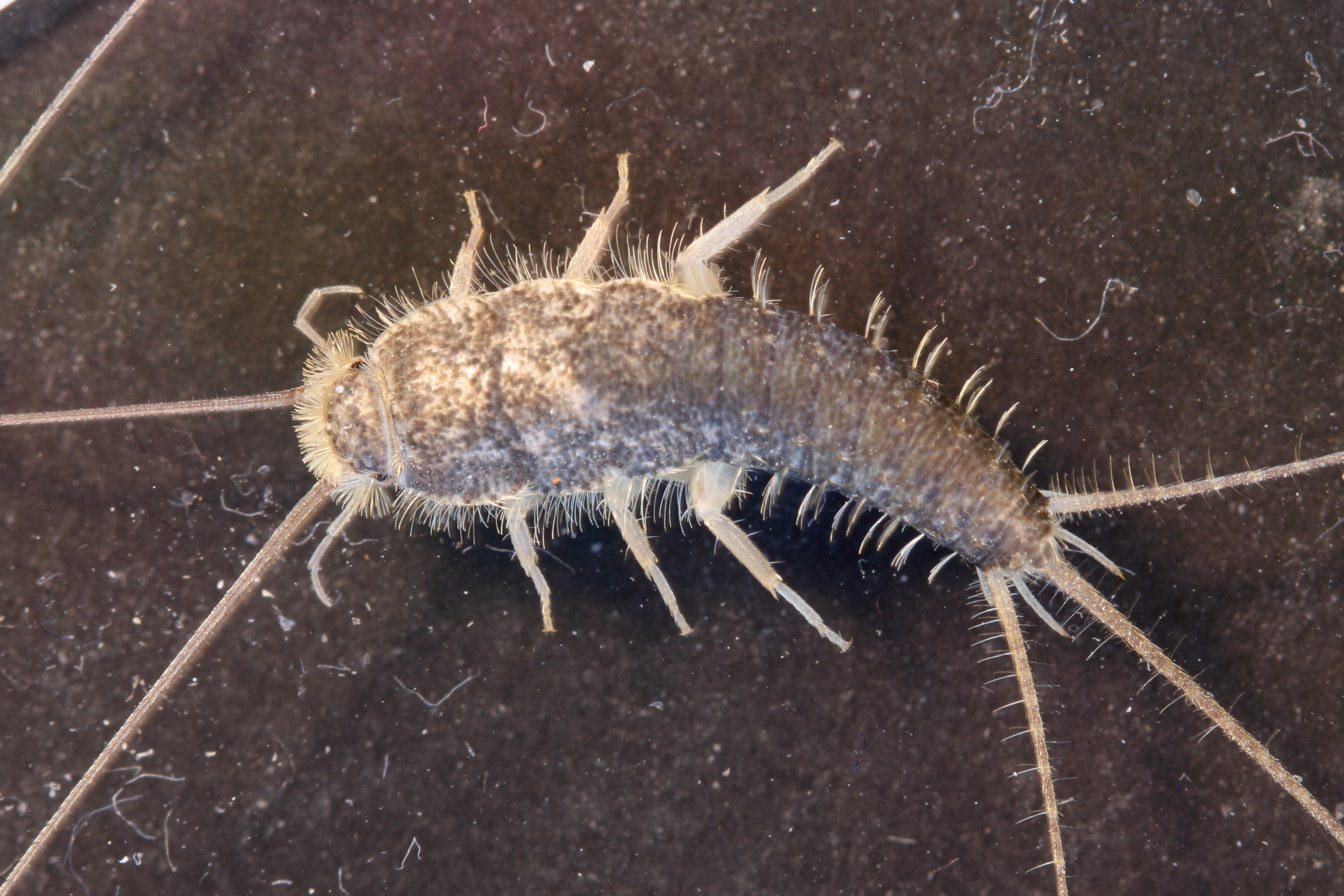

Scientific classification
- Kingdom: Animalia
- Phylum: Arthropoda
- Clade: Pancrustacea
- Class: Insecta
- Order: Zygentoma
- Family: Lepismatidae
- Genus: Ctenolepisma
- Species: C. longicaudatum

Binomial name
- Ctenolepisma longicaudatum Escherich, 1905

Synonyms
- Lepisma corticola Ridley, 1890; Ctenolepisma (Ctenolepisma) dives Silvestri, 1908; Ctenolepisma (Ctenolepisma) urbana Slabaugh, 1940; Ctenolepisma (Ctenolepisma) coreana Uchida, 1943; Ctenolepisma (Ctenolepisma) pinicola Uchida, 1964

= Ctenolepisma longicaudatum =

Species of insect

Ctenolepisma longicaudatum, generally known as the gray silverfish, long-tailed silverfish or paper silverfish, is a species of Zygentoma in the family Lepismatidae. It was described by the German entomologist Karl Leopold Escherich in 1905 based on specimens collected in South Africa, but is found worldwide as synanthrope in human housings.

In recent years, gray silverfish have increasingly become an issue in indoor environments in Europe, especially in newly built houses with a stable climate beneficial for the growth and reproduction of this species. As a food generalist with the ability to digest the cellulose contained in paper and cellulose-based textiles like rayon, Ctenolepisma longicaudatum is considered a pest species in cultural heritage institutions like libraries and archives.

== Nomenclature ==
Most authors have historically treated the nomenclatural gender of Ctenolepisma as feminine, but in 2018 the International Commission on Zoological Nomenclature issued a formal ruling (ICZN Opinion 2427) stating the gender of Lepisma (and all genera with that ending) is neuter, following ICZN Article 30, which resulted in changes to the spelling of several well-known species, including Ctenolepisma longicaudatum (formerly longicaudata).

== Biology ==
=== Appearance ===
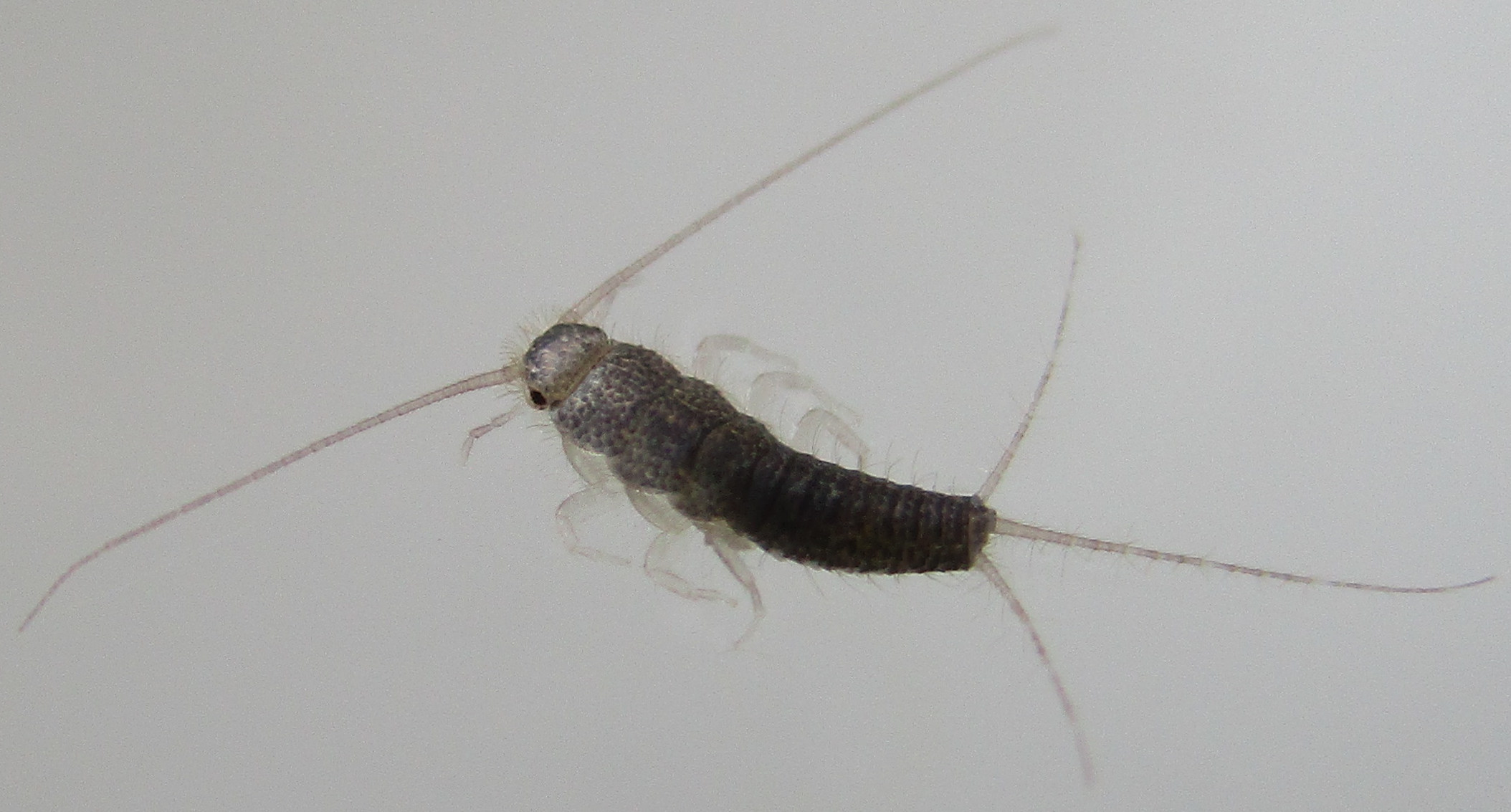
A nymph, 3 mm long (excluding antennae and tail)

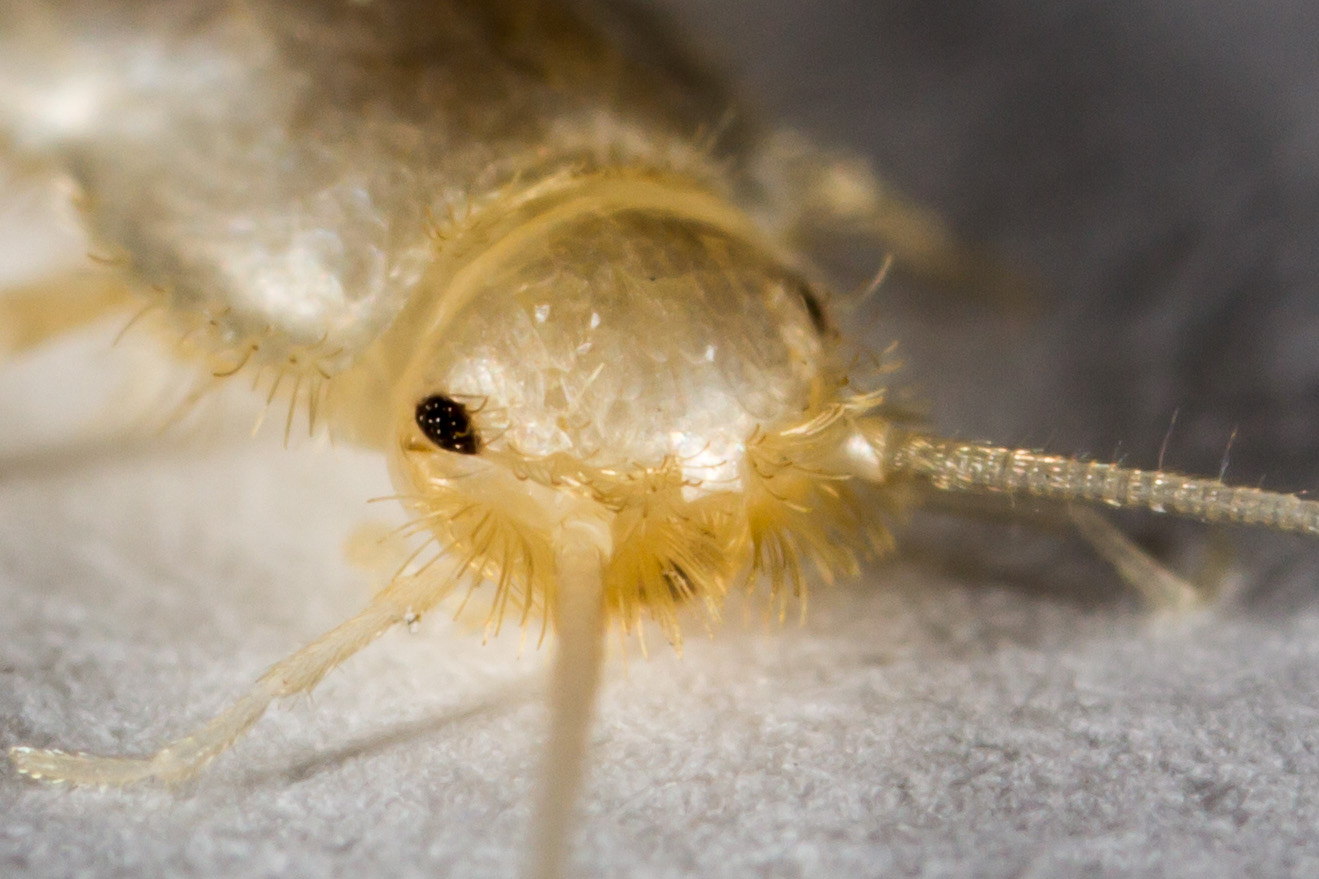
Close-up view of the head with the eyes consisting of twelve stemmata.

The nymphs and adults are slender, agile, fast-moving insects with long, paired antennae and three long appendages at the posterior abdomen: a pair of cerci and the single central epiproct. Intact antennae and tail filaments of long-tailed silverfishes are typically about body length. They are, however, easily damaged.

Apart from the earliest instars, the body is covered with scales, giving the light- to dark greyish animals a glimmering appearance, depending on incidence of light. The scales can easily detach from the body. The eyes consist of twelve stemmata, which are rather more rounded in early instars. With their brushes and bristles along the body sides, gray silverfish somewhat resemble the related firebrats.

=== Developmental stages ===
The eggs have an oval shape with dimensions of about 1.15 x 0.83 mm. Two to twenty eggs are laid per lot, and they are normally deposited about 2 mm into crevices or cracks, or under the edge of paper. Freshly laid eggs are smooth and cream-coloured; after three days the chorion turns yellow and exhibits shallow reticulate markings.

First instar nymphs have a special hatching organ on the frons of the head that helps them break free from the egg shell; this organ is shed with the first moulting. The air-filled crop pulsates vigorously in the hatching process, which takes about five minutes. The hatched first instar nymphs have a pale cream body colour and lack hairs and scales, the appendages are short and soft, and the anus seems to be closed.

3 mm long nymph

The 2nd instar nymphs exhibit a firmer, darker cream sclerotisation, and the longer appendages can be freely vibrated. A few bristles mark the position where the "brushes" of the mature stages will be. This number of bristles increases with subsequent moultings, and the bristle pattern might be indicative for each instar.

The 3rd, very active instar shows the body colour pattern of the succeeding instars: a dark cream colour with the edges of the thoracic terga and the anal lobes tinted purple.

The leggs of the first three instars have an increasing number of tarsal segments, by which they can be distinguished: the 1st instar has legs with two tarsal segments, whereas the 2nd instar exhibits three-segmented tarsi on the metathoracic pair of legs. The 3rd instar exhibits the three-segmented tarsi of all following stages.

6 mm long nymph, viewed from the side

In the 4th instar, the first pair of styli appears on the ninth abdominal sternum, as well as the scales covering the body.

Instars five to seven exhibit no particular distinguishing characters.

In the 9th instar, the second pair of styli appears on the eighth abdominal segment in males; in female, these appear in the 11th instar.

==== Genitalia ====
The genitalia first appear in the 8th nymphal instar, developing from two small lobes on the intersegmental membrane at the base of the cleft in the ninth sternum. The shape of this cleft, which first appears in the second instar and becomes more pronounced until the eighth instar, allows the distinction of the sex. A small cleft in the female's eighth sternum, which develops in early instars and completely divides this sternum in later instars, further facilitates sex determination.

The genitalia lobes remain short in males until the shape of the penis can be distinguished in the 11th nymphal instar, when the internal reproductive organs will also have developed, including seven large testicles. The two short vasa deferentia, which fuse immediately anterior to the penis, are thin-walled and slightly dilated at their distal ends; they lengthen in the next instar and form two loops between the two cercal nerves. The seminal vesicles form in the 13th instar, when also the penis reaches is final adult form by the ventral fusing of its rolled edges.

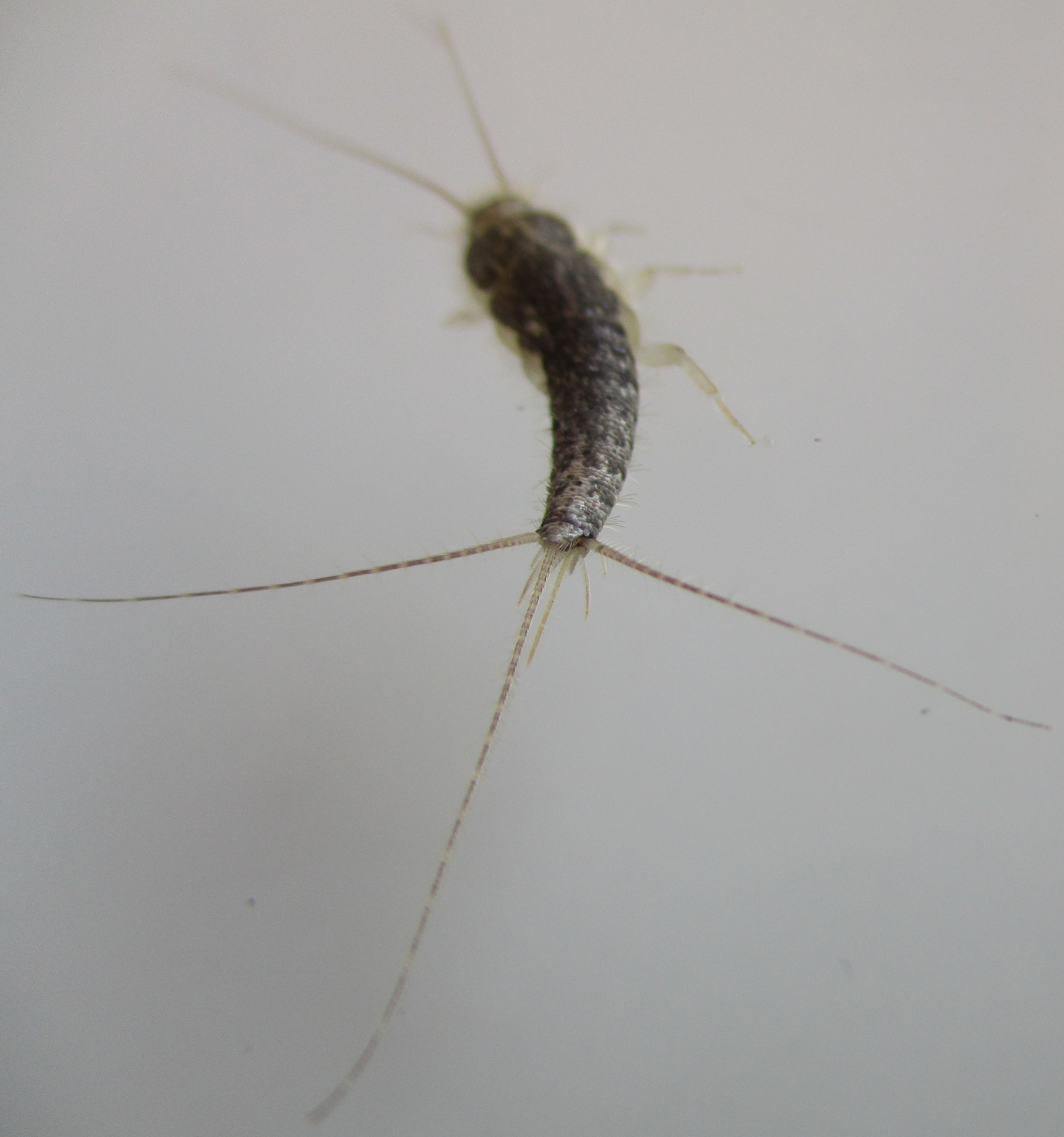
Posterior of a female Ctenolepisma longicaudata; body length 10 mm (excluding antennae and tail). Below the three long tail filaments or cerci are the long ovipositor in the middle and two pairs of styli downwards. Beside the ovipositor the two short extensions of the gonocoxites.

In comparison to males, the female's genitalia lobes elongate in succeeding moultings. In the 10th nymphal instar, a second, anterior pair of lobes develops from the intersegmental membrane between abdominal segments 8 and 9 and extends to the ninth sternum's cleft in the 11th instar. In the following 12th instar, both pairs of genitalia lobes are almost of equal length. In the 13th instar, the ovipositor of the adults is formed by fusion and interlocking of the posterior lobes with the anterior ones. The complete ovipositor extends circa 1.2 mm beyond the sternum. The spermatheca first appears in the 10th instar as a short lobe directed anteriorly from the gonophyses. In the 12th instar the two side sacs and the central neck are still thin-walled and rather undifferentiated, whereas in the following 13th instar, well-marked, soft walls have formed. The internal reproductive organs are developed until the 13th instar, although the accessory glands and the "yellow" glands still lack pigmentation and the ovarioles contain not yet differentiated ova. From the 14th instar on, no further development apart from a gradual increase in size takes place.

At 24 °C, eggs hatch after 34 days, and nymphs develop to the 13th instar within 11 months, with sexual maturity probably reached at 18 months of age. Gray silverfish can reach ages of about eight years, and unlike the hemi- and holometabolous insects, the ametabolous silverfish undergo further moultings even as imagines, with three to five moults per year.

=== Locomotion ===
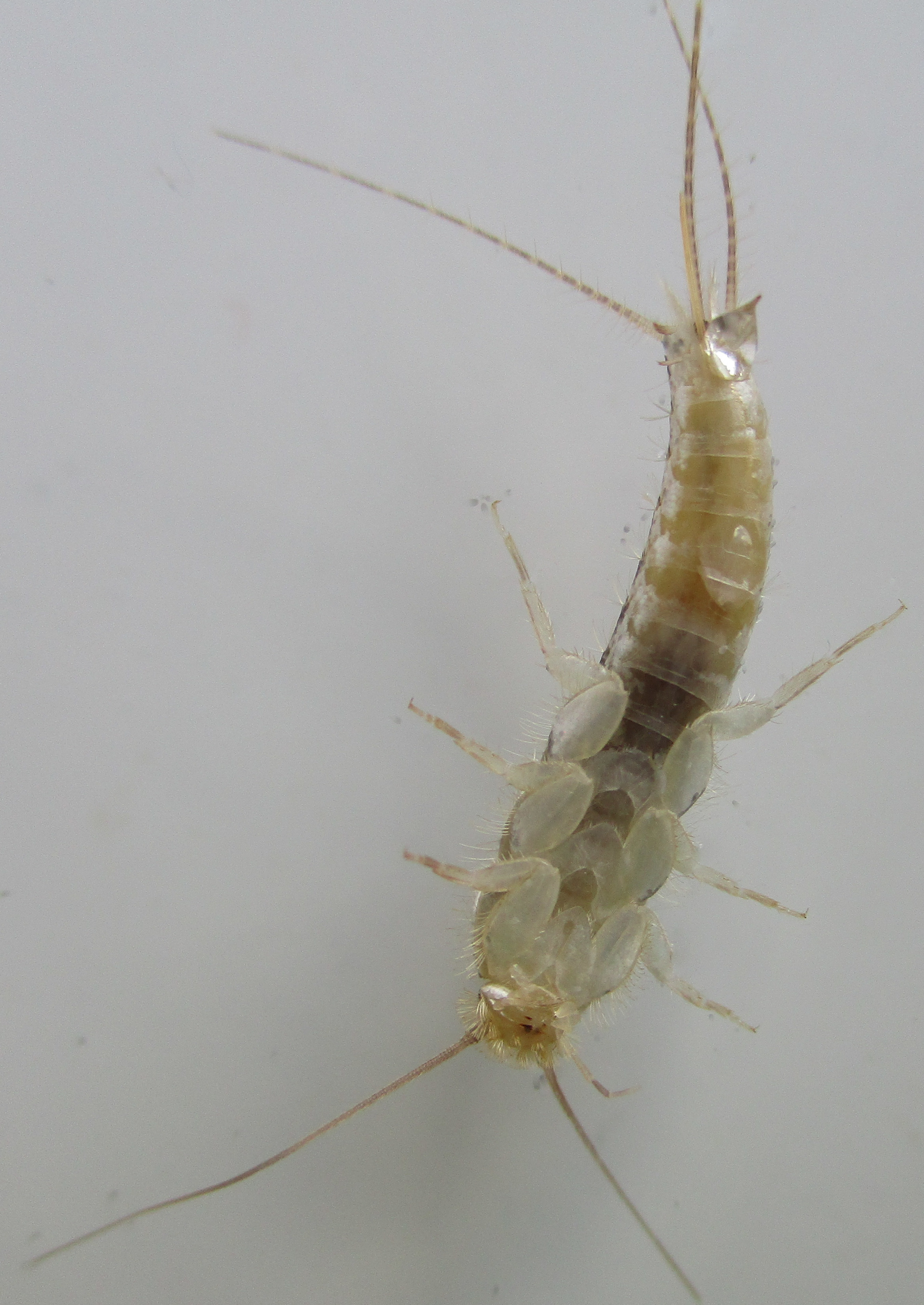
Underside of a Ctenolepisma longicaudata, ventral view with details of the legs; body length 14 mm (excluding antennae and tail)

Gray silverfishes move very fast on their six legs, but have little grip on smooth surfaces. They are not able to climb vertical smooth surfaces.

One can relatively easily be trapped by putting a glass jar over the silverfish, shove a piece of paper under the jar and let him walk on it; then shove a flat piece of plastic, e.g. a CD, under the paper and turn all upside down.

=== Digestive tract ===
Gray silverfish have a simple digestive tract, consisting of a hypopharynx, a large, thin-walled crop (with the same pH as the ingested food) that occupies more than half of the body length, followed by the toothed gizzard, the mid-intestine, anteriorly (pH 4.8–5.4) with sacculi and further posteriad (pH 6.4–7.0) with a peritrophic membrane enclosing the ingested food mass, the hind intestine (pH 2.6–3.8) with an anterior dorsal loop and ending in the rectum, with the anus being surrounded by two rows of papillae. The anterior region of the midgut exhibits gastric caeca, bladder-like extensions that absorb the nutrients of the digested food. Histologically, the midgut epithelium consists of a single layer of columnar cells that border the midgut lumen with a brush border membrane. Interspersed in the midgut epithelium are nests of stem cells. The surface of hind intestine and rectum is greatly increased by deep longitudinal folds, presumably extracting water from the faeces. The hypopharynx is flanked by a pair of large salivary glands which open into its lumen.

The mid-intestinal cells of early instars are already as differentiated as in mature stages, and the gizzard is of the same form, although with fewer serrations and hairs on the teeth. The malpighian tubules are relatively large until approximately the twelfth larval instar.

=== Diet ===
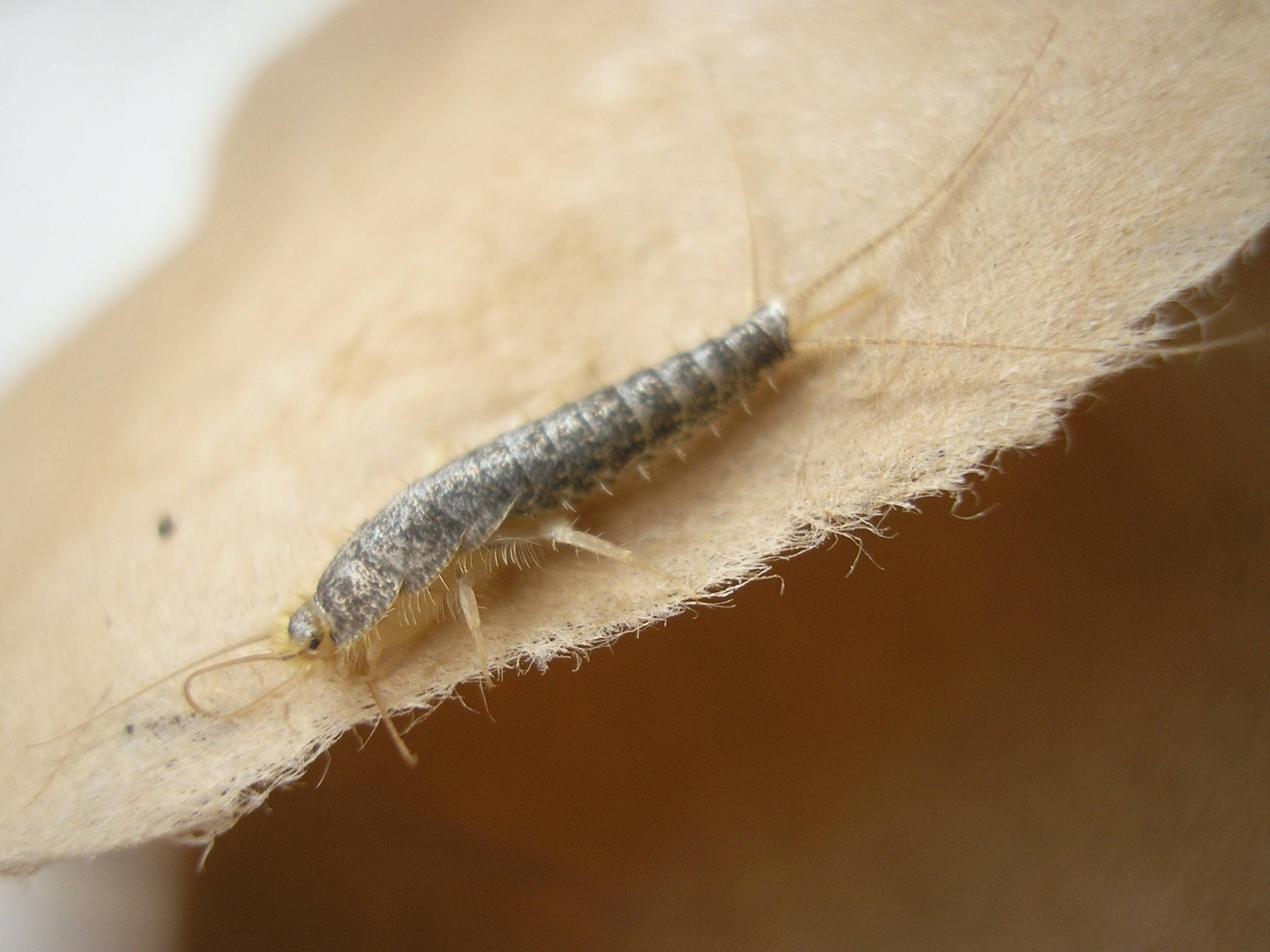
Ctenolepisma longicaudatum on paper.

Ctenolepisma longicaudatum is a synanthrope in human housings, and its natural food sources are unknown so that information on the biology of this species comes from indoor observations and rearings. Gray silverfish feed on a wide spectrum of substrates, ranging from plant remains like dried grass over insect remains to bread crumbs, paper, and artificial silk and cotton fabrics. They also eat cast skins from previous moults, as they prove rich in nutrients, containing 1% of the fat and 6% of the nitrogen stored in the body. Gray silverfish will not feed on wool felt, flannel, carpet, fur felt and natural silk. Paper made from mechanical pulp is not attacked, and that from Kraft and Esparto pulps is slightly attacked; only paper produced from (bleached or unbleached) sulphite pulps is readily eaten. Paper consisting of 80% sulphite pulp and 20% mechanical pulp greatly reduces the attack by gray silverfish as compared to 100% sulphite pulp paper. Papers with 45% or more of mechanical pulp content are not attacked. Starvation experiments showed that gray silverfish can survive without food for up to around 250 to 300 days.

While Lindsay (1940) states that gray silverfish do not actively take up (i.e., drink) water, but obtain it from the ingested food and from oxidation of food, Heep (1967) shows that free, dyed water is taken up into the gut by dehydrated gray silverfish. Dehydrated C. longicaudatum are able to replenish their body water content from the water vapour in air of 60 to 100% relative humidity.

=== Rearing ===
For rearing purposes, gray silverfish nymphs and adults can be fed on tissue paper, gummed paper, artificial silk, ground whole wheat and yeast, or oat flakes. The related firebrat, Thermobia domestica, can be fed whole wheat or plain flour; thoroughly dried and pulverised meat can be used as a strong attractant.

In a dry environment, gray silverfish will die within one month, therefore a high humidity of 70–85% must be maintained under rearing conditions, e.g. through open containers of water next to the rearing containers. In addition, a moist cotton wick or a shallow tray of sand that has to be kept always damp might be provided in the rearing containers. The cultivation temperature should be around 24 °C.

For egg deposition under rearing conditions, cotton wool can be provided. Since silverfish are nocturnal and photonegative, the light regime for a successful culture should be kept in favour of darkness, e.g. eight hours of light and 16 hours of darkness.

=== Reproduction ===
Reproduction is slow, as gray silverfish reach sexual maturity at the age of two to three years. They will reproduce for at least three years. The related firebrat reproduces only once a year and in irregular intervals.

=== Attractants ===
In the past it was assumed that gray silverfish use a contact pheromone for aggregation and arrestment, and that the aggregation pheromone of the Lepismatidae species Lepisma saccharinum (common silverfish) and Thermobia domestica (firebrat) has the same effect on the gray silverfish. Later research, first conducted on the firebrat Thermobia domestica, indicated that aggregation behaviour is not triggered by pheromones, but by an endosymbiotic fungus, Mycotypha microspora (Mycotyphaceae), and an endosymbiotic bacterium, Enterobacter cloacae (Enterobacteriaceae), which are present in the faeces. It was also shown that firebrats detect the presence of E. cloacae based on its external glycocalyx of polysaccharides, most likely based on its D-glucose component. Mycotypha microspora is only detected by firebrats in the presence of cellulose, suggesting that metabolites of the enzymatic cellulose digestion by M. microspora (such as D-glucose) serves as the aggregation/arrestment cue. In a follow-up study, it was shown that gray silverfish also respond with arrestment to Mycotypha microspora.

=== Natural enemies ===
Two species of Ctenolepisma are known to be parasitised by Strepsiptera: C. ciliatum is parasitised by Mengenilla chobauti, and C. michaelseni by Mengenilla parvula. It is not known as of yet, whether the gray silverfish is also parasitised by Mengenilla or other strepsipterans.

Two species of gregarine parasites are recorded from the intestinal tract of the gray silverfish: Garnhamia aciculata and Lepismatophila ctenolepismae. The related Ctenolepisma lineatum contains on average 15 specimens of parasitic Apicomplexa per animal in their intestinal tract, especially the crop.

The spitting spider Scytodes thoracica preys on Lepismatidae like the gray silverfish.

== As a pest ==
=== Damage of cellulose-based materials ===
Ctenolepisma longicaudatum is considered a pest species in cultural heritage institutions like libraries and archives, but can also cause damage in homes. The gray silverfish is able to feed on paper and similar materials comprising cellulose. In a comparative screening for cellulolytic activity, the gray silverfish was found to have the highest relative cellulase activity, by far exceeding that of other cellulose-digesting insects like Conocephalus strictus (Orthoptera), the termite Reticulitermes flavipes (Blattodea: Rhinotermitidae), Cryptocercus roaches (Blattodea: Cryptocercidae) and Scolytinae bark beetles (Coleoptera).

The highest activity of plant cell wall degrading enzymes is found in the head and especially in the foregut of the gray silverfish. Endoglucanase, which breaks down the cellulose chain into smaller fragments, is found in both the head and foregut part of the digestive tract, whereas β-glucosidase, which catalyses the final degradation into glucose, is present in the foregut, but not in the head tissue; β-xylosidase activity is very low in the head, but the enzyme is present in the foregut. Polygalacturonase activity is not observed in C. longicaudatum. A cellulose-rich diet does not increase the cellulase activity, suggesting that the production of these cellulolytic enzymes is not diet-regulated.

Although a mixed diet is necessary for the natural development of C. longicaudatum, it can survive more than 600 days on a diet of cellulose alone. As such, the gray silverfish is a threat to cultural heritage institutions storing books, sheet music, paintings and similar objects. A Swedish survey on the damage impact of C. longicaudatum reports attacks on: watercolor paintings; packing material; cartons; books, where the outer cover, glued areas inside of the cover and marbled paper were eaten; historical documents of handmade paper; paper documents; transcripts; stamps in showrooms; newly produced signs labels in showrooms; historical paper labels on objects; mounting paper on the back of a photograph; roll painting in genuine silk, mounted with starch paste on masonite; insects caught in adhesive traps.

=== Control measures ===
In recent years, gray silverfish have been reported from a number of European countries (see section Distribution), where they have been recorded as a nuisance pest in houses, kindergartens and schools, but also as damaging cellulose-based materials in a warehouse and in cultural heritage institutions like museums, libraries and archives. In Norwegian houses, the number of pest control measurements against the gray silverfish have drastically increased since the year 2016. The majority of insurance cases involving the gray silverfish apply to new houses built after the year 2000, which, due to the improved wall insulation, assumingly provide more favourable living conditions for this species.

Due to their relatively slow development and longevity and their ability to survive up to ten months without food, control measurements against the gray silverfish have to be applied over an extended period of time. An integrated pest management, applying several control measurements in parallel, has been proposed as the most promising approach for the control of this species. This includes the removal of potential food sources such as food crumbs by wiping the floor also beneath and behind cooking stoves and refrigerators, and storage of dried food products, including tea bags and animal food, in sealed containers. Reducing the amount of water used during cleaning will reduce indoor humidity, which is detrimental for egg development. It should also be kept in mind that gray silverfish do not have to drink, and can use the water vapour contained in air of 60% relative humidity and higher as their water source instead.

==== Trapping ====
A common control measurement is the use of sticky traps, especially for monitoring purposes to get an idea on the dimension of silverfish infestation. Adding milled cricket powder to sticky traps as protein-rich bait has been shown to result in a significantly higher average catch as compared to unbaited sticky traps.

==== Poisoning ====
Toxic baits are another means of reducing or eradicating silverfish infestation. Aak et al. (2020) tested different commercially available paste-based products, containing imidacloprid, clothianidin, fipronil or indoxacarb as active ingredient, regarding their effect in pest management of gray silverfish. Imidacloprid was found to cause a mortality rate of less than 50% after 18 days, whereas the other three pesticides caused mortality rates above 90%. Indoxacarb application in field trials decreased gray silverfish populations to less than 10% within 10 to 12 weeks. Since silverfish also consume dead insects, including specimens of their own species, secondary poisoning through the consumption of primarily poisoned individuals has an additional population-reducing effect. With 75% mortality, indoxacarb was found to be much more potent in secondary poisoning as compared to clothianidin with a 15% mortality rate. Indoxacarb was therefore evaluated as the most potent poison against gray silverfish, and even six-month old bait was still able to cause a high mortality rate. However, the use of Indoxacarb is not permitted in the EU and Switzerland as the approval was withdrawn in 2022. Fipronil as poison was not further investigated due to its comparatively high toxicity for humans.

When using toxic baits, attention should be paid to the secure placement of these baits to minimise the chance of unintentional ingestion by pets or children. Placing small droplets of gel-based poison into gaps, crevices and cracks that act as natural hiding places for silverfish during the day will reduce the likelihood of unintended contact and at the same time increase the chance of the poison being ingested by the gray silverfish. Distributing many small poison bait droplets, as opposed to few large portions, evenly over the infested area will further increase the success of the poison treatment.

A study on the efficacy of various poisonous baits (containing boric acid, hydramethylnon, indoxacarb, abamectin, chlorfenapyr, dinotefuran, fipronil, metaflumizone, and novaluron) against the related Lepismatidae species Thermobia domestica and Lepisma saccharinum has been conducted by Sims & Appel (2012).

==== Pesticide spraying ====
Studies on the effects of pesticide sprays on Ctenolepisma longicaudatum have not been published. A study by Faulde et al. (2003) investigated the knockdown (i.e., inability to move, and lying upside down) effect of fabrics spray-impregnated with permethrin on the related common silverfish (Lepisma saccharinum), where a 100% knockdown was observed after 5.5 ± 2.6 min of exposure to the permethrin coating.

Since the premises inhabited by gray silverfish are usually co-inhabited by humans, the application of pesticides in the form of sprays should be avoided wherever possible, and more targeted approaches like bait poisoning should be considered. As pesticide-sprayed areas will be avoided by silverfish, a risk of their dispersal towards unaffected areas is given, which will prolong the pest management efforts.

==== Temperature treatment ====
At temperatures of 16 °C and below, the growth rate is considerably decreased, with an average length of adult stadia (i.e., the time between two consecutive mouldings) of 126 days as compared to 15 days at 29 °C. 16 °C can therefore be seen as limiting temperature for active feeding and growth. Torpor sets in at a temperature of 13 °C, and at 11 °C, ecdysis stops. Nymphs are much more sensitive to cold: at a temperature of 1 °C, second instar larvae die within two days, whereas adult specimens can survive several months. At 21 °C, egg development takes on average 49 days, which decreases with higher temperatures; at 29.5 °C, hatching occurs after 20 days. At 21 °C, the first larval instar is on average 9 days long, which is reduced to 5 days at temperatures of 24 °C and above. Prolonged temperatures above 24 °C are eventually fatal for gray silverfish: At 26 °C, the survival is 4 months, and at temperatures of 29 to 33.6 °C, survival time drops to 1–3 weeks. Heeg (1967) found the optimum temperature range of the gray silverfish to be in the range of 8 to 25 °C, with the upper avoidance temperature at 40–43 °C. Survival rate at high temperatures is higher in dry air of 5% relative humidity (RH) as compared to 85% RH, presumably due to water evaporation from the insects' bodies. However, prolonged exposure to such low humidity levels will lead to death within 2–4 weeks. A critical humidity value seems to be 55%, below which the period of survival is drastically reduced.

These observations show that ambient temperature should be taken into account when applying an integrated pest management plan. If poisoned bait is used, temperatures should be at 20 °C or higher, as food is consumed much more rapidly as compared to 16 °C (at even lower temperatures, feeding comes to a halt). If the aim is to gain time to prepare control measures, a decrease in ambient temperature in the infested premises to 16 °C or lower is advisable to slow down population growth.

== Distribution ==
The natural distribution of the gray silverfish is unknown, since all observations are from within or near human dwellings.

The gray silverfish is recorded from the following European countries:

- Albania
- Austria: first record from a museum depot in Vienna in 2002
- Belgium: oldest record from 1998
- Bulgaria
- Cyprus
- Czech Republic: first record from 2017
- Denmark: first record in 2017
- Faroe Islands: recorded in 2017
- Estonia: recorded in 2018
- Finland
- France
- Germany: oldest record from Hamburg in 1906, where live specimens were intercepted from Echinocactus plants imported from Mexico
- Greece
- Ireland
- Italy: first record 1908 from Italy as misidentification C. ciliatum var. dives
- Lithuania
- Luxembourg
- Malta
- Netherlands: oldest record from 1989
- Norway: oldest confirmed records 1979 from the Zoological Museum of Oslo, and 2006 from Bærum, officially registered for the country in 2014
- Portugal
- Russia
- Slovakia
- Slovenia
- Spain
- Sweden: present since 1994
- Switzerland
- Ukraine
- United Kingdom: record from 2014

African countries with records of the gray silverfish:

- Algeria
- Botswana
- Egypt
- Malawi: oldest record from Blantyre in 1908
- Morocco
- Mozambique: oldest record from Beira in 1912
- Namibia: oldest record from 1933
- Seychelles
- South Africa: first record 1905 from Bothaville, the type locality of the gray silverfish
- Zimbabwe

American countries and regions with records of the gray silverfish:

- Argentina
- Brazil: oldest record from Santos in 1908
- Canada
- Colombia
- Cuba
- Ecuador
- El Salvador
- Mexico
- Panama
- Paraguay
- Peru: oldest record from Callao in 1908
- Puerto Rico
- Trinidad and Tobago
- United States: Florida, Louisiana, North Carolina, Missouri, Illinois, Hawaii, southern California (first(?) record 1955 from Pacific Beach)

Asian countries and regions with records of the gray silverfish:

- Afghanistan
- Armenia
- Bangladesh
- China: Hong Kong
- India
- Israel
- Japan
- Lebanon
- Malaysia
- Philippines
- Singapore
- South Korea
- Thailand
- Turkey

Oceanian countries with records of the gray silverfish:

- Australia: oldest record from 1905
- New Caledonia
- New Zealand
- Vanuatu
