= Ctenolepisma terebrans =

Scientific classification
- Domain: Eukaryota
- Kingdom: Animalia
- Phylum: Arthropoda
- Class: Insecta
- Order: Zygentoma
- Family: Lepismatidae
- Genus: Ctenolepisma
- Species: C. terebrans

Binomial name
- Ctenolepisma terebrans Silvestri, 1908

Species of silverfish

Ctenolepisma terebrans is a species of silverfish in the family Lepismatidae.

== Subspecies ==
These two subspecies belong to the species Ctenolepisma terebrans:

- Ctenolepisma terebrans pluriseta Silvestri, 1908
- Ctenolepisma terebrans terebrans
