= Ctenolepisma vieirai =

Scientific classification
- Domain: Eukaryota
- Kingdom: Animalia
- Phylum: Arthropoda
- Class: Insecta
- Order: Zygentoma
- Family: Lepismatidae
- Genus: Ctenolepisma
- Species: C. vieirai

Binomial name
- Ctenolepisma vieirai Mendes, 1981

Species of silverfish

Ctenolepisma vieirai is a species of silverfish in the family Lepismatidae. It is found in Europe.
