= Ctenolepisma hummelincki =

Scientific classification
- Domain: Eukaryota
- Kingdom: Animalia
- Phylum: Arthropoda
- Class: Insecta
- Order: Zygentoma
- Family: Lepismatidae
- Genus: Ctenolepisma
- Species: C. hummelincki

Binomial name
- Ctenolepisma hummelincki Wygodzinsky, 1959

Species of silverfish

Ctenolepisma hummelincki is a species of silverfish in the family Lepismatidae. It is found in the Caribbean Sea.
