= Ctenolepisma versluysi =

Scientific classification
- Domain: Eukaryota
- Kingdom: Animalia
- Phylum: Arthropoda
- Class: Insecta
- Order: Zygentoma
- Family: Lepismatidae
- Genus: Ctenolepisma
- Species: C. versluysi

Binomial name
- Ctenolepisma versluysi Escherich, 1905

Species of silverfish

Ctenolepisma versluysi is a species of silverfish in the family Lepismatidae.
