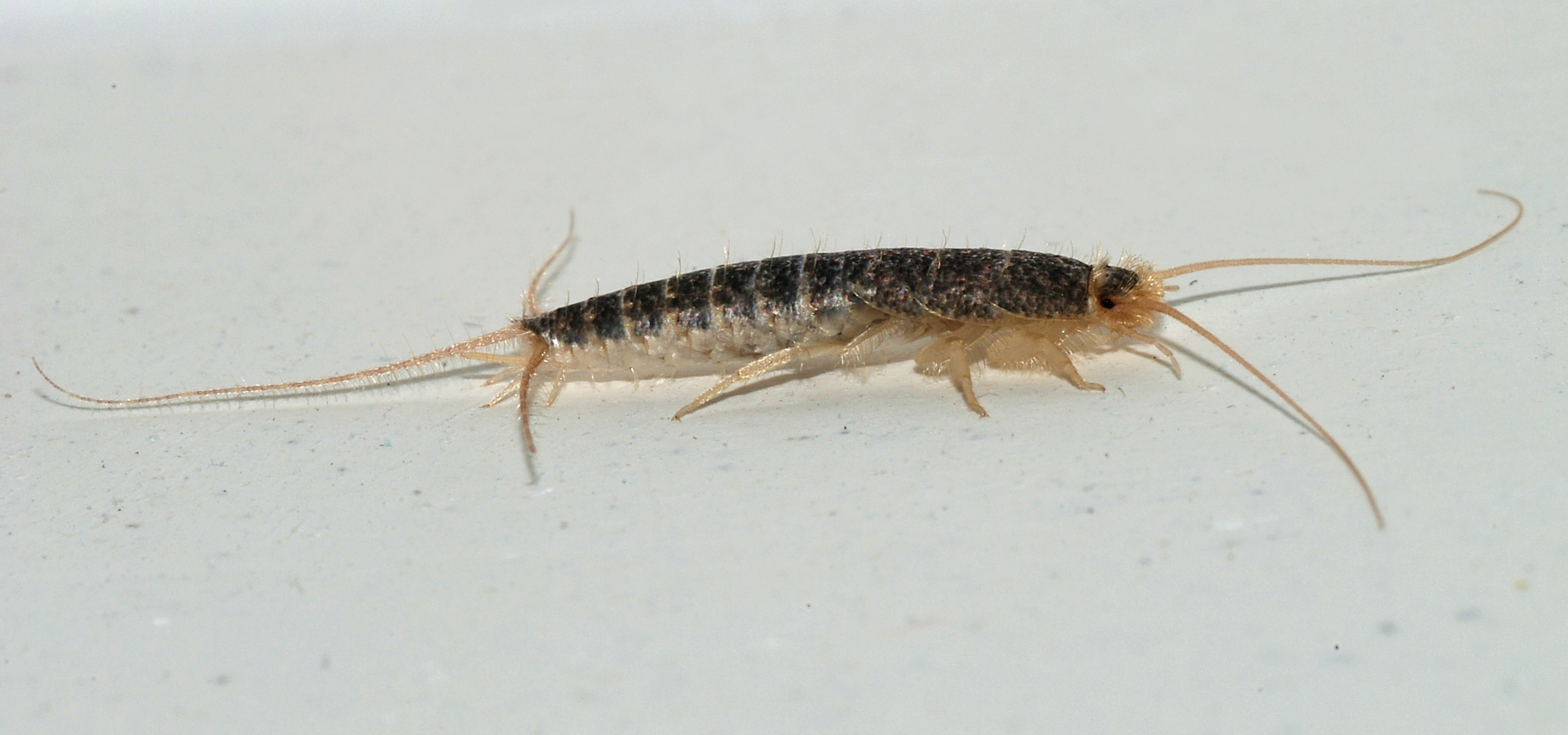
- Ctenolepisma longicaudatum

Scientific classification
- Kingdom: Animalia
- Phylum: Arthropoda
- Class: Insecta
- Order: Zygentoma
- Family: Lepismatidae
- Genus: Ctenolepisma; Escherich, 1905

Species
- about 75; see text

= Ctenolepisma =

Genus of silverfishes

Ctenolepisma is a genus of primitive insects in the order Zygentoma, closely related to the silverfish and firebrat but less reliant on human habitation, some species being found both indoors and outdoors and some found exclusively outdoors. The genus is distributed nearly worldwide in warm regions. Australia lacks native Ctenolepisma, but is home to introduced species.

== Nomenclature ==
Most authors have historically treated the nomenclatural gender of Ctenolepisma as feminine, but in 2018 the International Commission on Zoological Nomenclature issued a formal ruling (ICZN Opinion 2427) stating the gender of Lepisma (and all genera with that ending) is neuter, following ICZN Article 30, which resulted in changes to the spelling of several well-known species, including Ctenolepisma longicaudatum (formerly longicaudata).

== Diversity ==
There are roughly 75 extant species presently recognized as valid in the genus, and one fossil:

- Ctenolepisma abyssinicum Mendes, 1982 (Ethiopia)
- Ctenolepisma africanellum Wygodzinsky, 1955 (South Africa)
- Ctenolepisma algharbicum Mendes, 1978 (Portugal)
- Ctenolepisma almeriense Molero-Baltanás, Gaju-Ricart & Bach de Roca, 2005 (Spain)
- Ctenolepisma alticola Silvestri, 1935 (Karakorum)
- Ctenolepisma angustiellum Silvestri, 1949 (Africa)
- Ctenolepisma barchanicum Kaplin, 1985 (Turkmenistan)
- Ctenolepisma basilewskyi Wygodzinsky, 1965 (Kenya)
- Ctenolepisma boettgerianum Paclt, 1961 (India)
- Ctenolepisma burmanicum (Parona, 1892) (Myanmar)
  [Synonym: Lepisma burmanica Parona, 1892]
- Ctenolepisma cabindae Mendes, 2002d (Angola)
- Ctenolepisma calvum (Ritter, 1910) (Sri Lanka)
  [Synonym: Peliolepisma calva Ritter, 1910]
- Ctenolepisma ciliatum (Dufour, 1831) (Mediterranean; Cape Verde; Afghanistan; Iran)
  [Synonyms: Lepisma ciliata Dufour, 1831, Ctenolepisma fuliginosa (Lucas, 1846), Lepisma fuliginosa Lucas, 1846]
- Ctenolepisma conductrix Silvestri, 1918 (Libya)
- Ctenolepisma confalonieri Silvestri, 1932 (Africa)
- Ctenolepisma decellei Mendes, 1982 (Chad)
- Ctenolepisma desaegeri Mendes, 1982 (Democratic Republic of the Congo)
- Ctenolepisma dewittei Mendes, 1982 (Democratic Republic of the Congo)
- Ctenolepisma dubitale Wygodzinsky, 1959 (Leeward Island)
- Ctenolepisma dzhungaricum Kaplin, 1982 (Kazakhstan)
- †Ctenolepisma electrans Mendes, 1998b (Dominican amber)
- Ctenolepisma fasciatum (Lucas, 1863) (Senegal) doubtful
- Ctenolepisma feae Silvestri, 1908 (Cape Verde)
- Ctenolepisma gabuense Mendes, 1985 (Guinea-Bissau)
- Ctenolepisma guadianicum Mendes, 1992 (Portugal)
- Ctenolepisma guanche Mendes, 1993 (Canary Islands)
- Ctenolepisma guineense Mendes, 1985 (Guinea-Bissau)
- Ctenolepisma gunini Kaplin, 1989 (Mongolia)
- Ctenolepisma halophila Kaplin, 1981 (Turkmenistan)
- Ctenolepisma howa Escherich in Voeltzkow, 1910 (Madagascar)
- Ctenolepisma hummelincki Wygodzinsky, 1959 (Windward Islands)
- Ctenolepisma immane Mendes, 2004 (Socotra)
- Ctenolepisma incita Silvestri, 1918 (Africa)
- Ctenolepisma insulicola Mendes, 1984 (Greece)
- Ctenolepisma iranicum Molero, Kahrarian & Gaju, 2016 (Iran)
- Ctenolepisma kaszabi Wygodzinsky, 1970a (Mongolia)
- Ctenolepisma kermanshanum Molero, Kahrarian & Gaju, 2016 (Iran)
- Ctenolepisma kervillei Silvestri, 1911 (Syria, Iran, Oman)
- Ctenolepisma kuhitangicum Kaplin, 1993 (Turkmenistan)
- Ctenolepisma latisternatum Mendes, 1993 (Congo Basin)
- Ctenolepisma lindbergi Wygodzinsky, 1955 (Cape Verde)
- Ctenolepisma lineatum (Fabricius, 1775) – four-lined silverfish (Europe); the type species of the genus Ctenolepisma
- Ctenolepisma longicaudatum Escherich, 1905 (syn. C. urbana) – grey silverfish (cosmopolitan)
- Ctenolepisma madagascariense Escherich in Voeltzkow, 1910 (Madagascar)
- Ctenolepisma maroccanum Mendes, 1980 (Morocco)
- Ctenolepisma nigericum Mendes, 1982 (Nigeria)
- Ctenolepisma nigrum (Oudemans in Weber, 1890) (syn. Lepisma nigra) (Indonesia, India)
- Ctenolepisma petiti (Lucas, 1840) (syn. Lepisma petiti) (Senegal) doubtful
- Ctenolepisma picturatum Wygodzinsky, 1955 (South Africa)
- Ctenolepisma pinicola Uchida, 1964 (Japan)
- Ctenolepisma pretorianum Wygodzinsky, 1955 (South Africa)
- Ctenolepisma przewalskyi Kaplin, 1982 (Kyrgyzstan)
- Ctenolepisma roszkowskii Stach, 1935 (Israel, Tunisia)
- Ctenolepisma rothschildi Silvestri, 1907 (syn. C. diversisquamis, C. reducta) (Africa; Iran)
- Ctenolepisma sabirovae Kaplin, 1980 (Turkmenistan)
- Ctenolepisma sagartianum Molero, Kahrarian & Gaju, 2016 (Iran)
- Ctenolepisma sanctaehelenae Wygodzinsky, 1970b (Saint Helena)
- Ctenolepisma sergii Kaplin, 1982 (Kazakhstan)
- Ctenolepisma serranoi Mendes, 1985 (syn. C. gambiana) (Guinea-Bissau)
- Ctenolepisma somaliense Mendes, 1988 (Somalia)
- Ctenolepisma submagnum Silvestri, 1908 (Guinea-Bissau)
- Ctenolepisma subterraneum Molero, Tahami, Sadeghi & Gaju, 2018
- Ctenolepisma sudanicum Mendes, 1982 (Sudan)
- Ctenolepisma tanzanicum Mendes, 1982 (Tanzania)
- Ctenolepisma targionianum Silvestri, 1908 (Africa, Americas)
- Ctenolepisma targionii (Grassi & Rovelli, 1889) (syn. Lepisma targionii) (Mediterranean)
- Ctenolepisma tavaresi Navás, 1906 (Portugal) doubtful
- Ctenolepisma tenebricum Silvestri, 1949 (central Africa)
- Ctenolepisma terebrans Silvestri, 1908 (South Africa)
  - Ctenolepisma terebrans pluriseta Silvestri, 1908 (Africa)
  - Ctenolepisma terebrans terebrans Silvestri, 1908
- Ctenolepisma turcomanicum Kaplin, 1993 (Turkmenistan)
- Ctenolepisma unipectinatum Mendes, 1982 (Kenya)
- Ctenolepisma unistila Silvestri, 1908 (Cape Verde)
- Ctenolepisma vanharteni Mendes, 2004 (Socotra)
- Ctenolepisma versluysi Escherich, 1905 (Mexico, Antilles)
- Ctenolepisma vieirai Mendes, 1981 (Madeira)
- Ctenolepisma villosum (Fabricius, 1775) (syn. Lepisma villosa) (China, Japan, Korea)
- Ctenolepisma wahrmani Wygodzinsky, 1952 (Brazil)
- Ctenolepisma weberi Escherich, 1905 (South Africa)

== Gallery ==
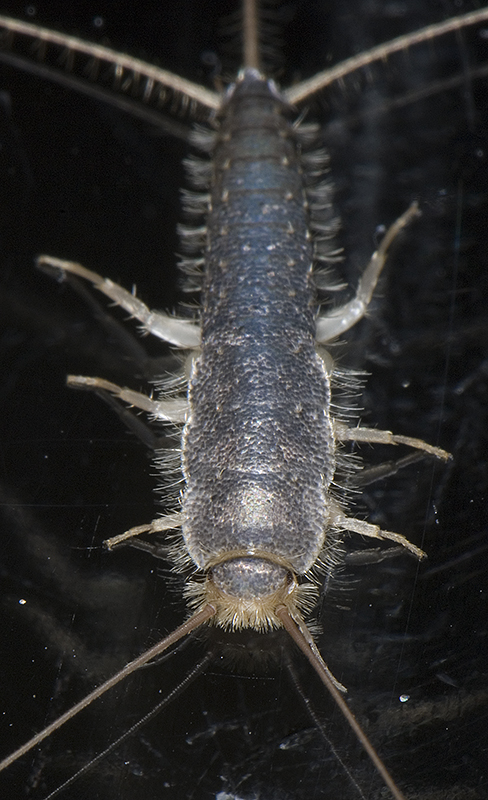
Ctenolepisma longicaudatum

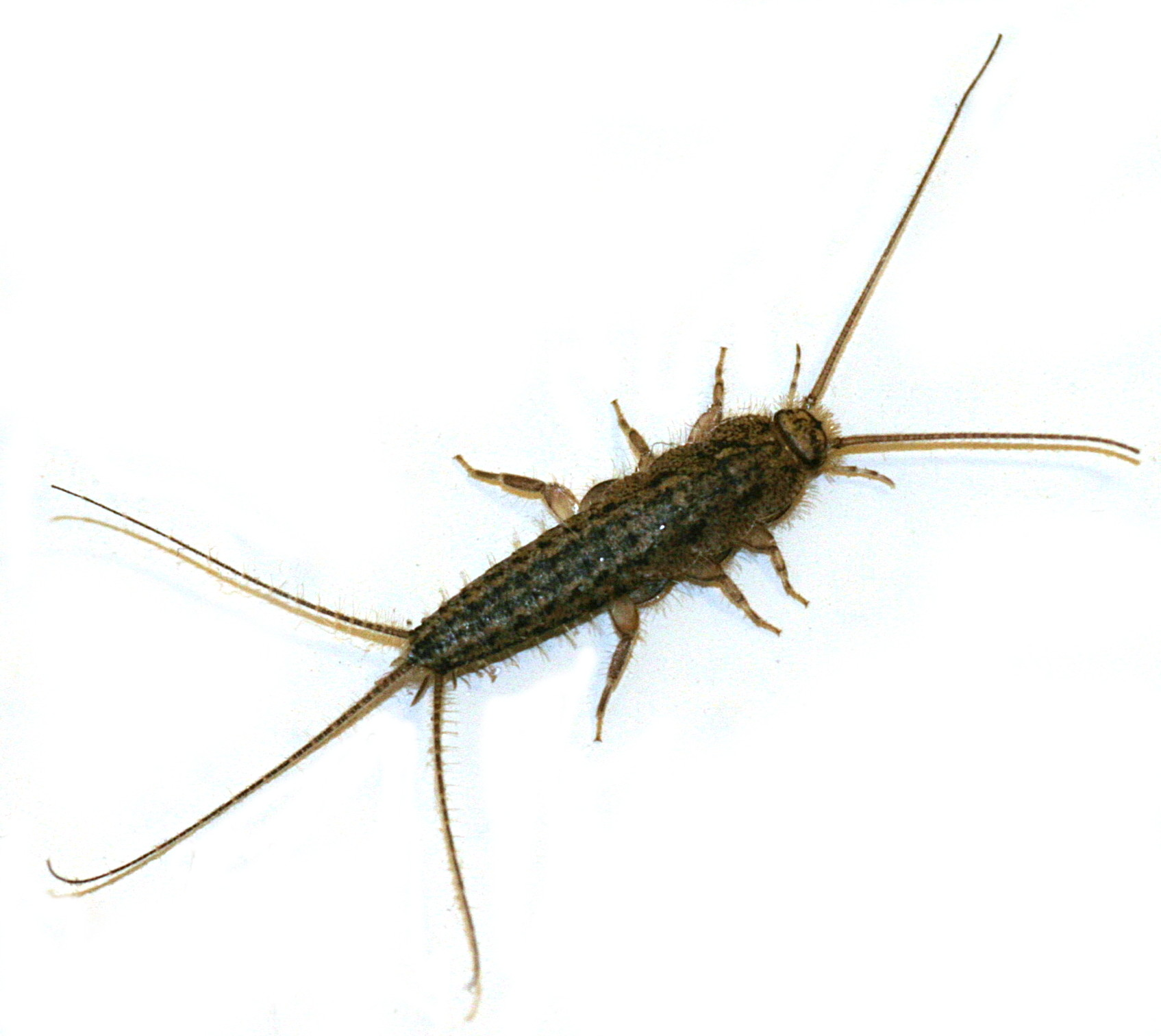
Ctenolepisma lineatum

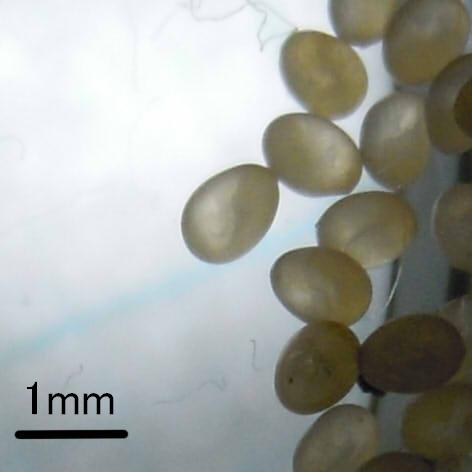
Eggs of Ctenolepisma villosum
