= Ctenolepisma targionii =

Scientific classification
- Domain: Eukaryota
- Kingdom: Animalia
- Phylum: Arthropoda
- Class: Insecta
- Order: Zygentoma
- Family: Lepismatidae
- Genus: Ctenolepisma
- Species: C. targionii

Binomial name
- Ctenolepisma targionii (Grassi & Rovelli, 1889)

Species of silverfish

Ctenolepisma targionii is a species of silverfish in the family Lepismatidae. It is found in North America.
