= Ctenolepisma tanzanicum =

Scientific classification
- Domain: Eukaryota
- Kingdom: Animalia
- Phylum: Arthropoda
- Class: Insecta
- Order: Zygentoma
- Family: Lepismatidae
- Genus: Ctenolepisma
- Species: C. tanzanicum

Binomial name
- Ctenolepisma tanzanicum Mendes, 1982

Species of silverfish

Ctenolepisma tanzanicum is a species of silverfish in the family Lepismatidae.
