= Ctenolepisma rothschildi =

Scientific classification
- Domain: Eukaryota
- Kingdom: Animalia
- Phylum: Arthropoda
- Class: Insecta
- Order: Zygentoma
- Family: Lepismatidae
- Genus: Ctenolepisma
- Species: C. rothschildi

Binomial name
- Ctenolepisma rothschildi (Silvestri, 1907)

Species of silverfish

Ctenolepisma rothschildi is a species of silverfish in the family Lepismatidae. It is found in Africa, Australia, the Caribbean Sea, Europe and Northern Asia (excluding China), Central America, North America, Oceania, South America, and Southern Asia.
