= Ctenolepisma electrans =

Scientific classification
- Domain: Eukaryota
- Kingdom: Animalia
- Phylum: Arthropoda
- Class: Insecta
- Order: Zygentoma
- Family: Lepismatidae
- Genus: Ctenolepisma
- Species: C. electrans

Binomial name
- Ctenolepisma electrans Mendes, 1998

Species of silverfish

Ctenolepisma electrans is a species of silverfish in the family Lepismatidae.
