= Ctenolepisma dubitale =

Scientific classification
- Domain: Eukaryota
- Kingdom: Animalia
- Phylum: Arthropoda
- Class: Insecta
- Order: Zygentoma
- Family: Lepismatidae
- Genus: Ctenolepisma
- Species: C. dubitale

Binomial name
- Ctenolepisma dubitale Wygodzinsky, 1959

Species of silverfish

Ctenolepisma dubitale is a species of silverfish in the family Lepismatidae.
