= Ctenolepisma targionianum =

Scientific classification
- Domain: Eukaryota
- Kingdom: Animalia
- Phylum: Arthropoda
- Class: Insecta
- Order: Zygentoma
- Family: Lepismatidae
- Genus: Ctenolepisma
- Species: C. targionianum

Binomial name
- Ctenolepisma targionianum Sivestri, 1908

Species of silverfish

Ctenolepisma targionianum is a species of silverfish in the family Lepismatidae.
