= Ctenolepisma guadianicum =

Scientific classification
- Domain: Eukaryota
- Kingdom: Animalia
- Phylum: Arthropoda
- Class: Insecta
- Order: Zygentoma
- Family: Lepismatidae
- Genus: Ctenolepisma
- Species: C. guadianicum

Binomial name
- Ctenolepisma guadianicum Mendes, 1992

Species of silverfish

Ctenolepisma guadianicum is a species of silverfish in the family Lepismatidae.
