= Ctenolepisma almeriense =

Scientific classification
- Kingdom: Animalia
- Phylum: Arthropoda
- Clade: Pancrustacea
- Class: Insecta
- Order: Zygentoma
- Family: Lepismatidae
- Genus: Ctenolepisma
- Species: C. almeriense

Binomial name
- Ctenolepisma almeriense Molero Baltanás, Gaju Ricart & Bach de Roca, 2005

Extinct species of insect

Ctenolepisma almeriense is a species of primitive insect of the order Zygentoma. Members of this species were once attributed to the widespread species Ctenolepisma lineatum but there are small but consistent differences which mark this as a separate species. It is found exclusively in south-eastern Spain, on Mediterranean slopes of the provinces of Alicante, Almería, Murcia and Valencia.

This species inhabits arid regions, usually under debris at the base of trees and shrubs, especially Pinus and Juniperus. There appears to be no overlap in the ranges of this species and C. lineatum, the latter species preferring moister environments.

Both C. lineatum and C. almeriense are up to 13mm in length (excluding appendages) with considerable variation in pattern. The only consistent morphological differences between the two is in the combs of bristles on the thorax, C. almeriense generally having these combs in double-rows rather than single.
