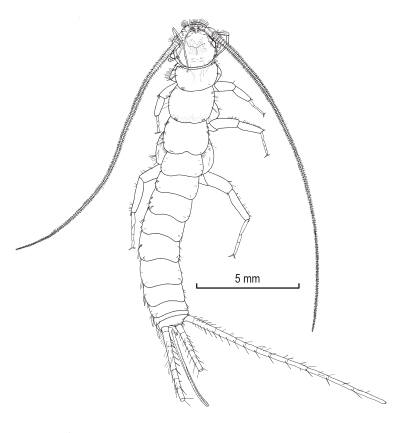
- Maindronia bashagardensis

Scientific classification
- Kingdom: Animalia
- Phylum: Arthropoda
- Clade: Pancrustacea
- Class: Insecta
- Order: Zygentoma
- Family: Maindroniidae; Escherich, 1905

Species
- Maindroniinae; Maindronia; M. bashagardensis; M. beieri; M. mascatensis; Atacaminae; Atacamus; A. neotropicalis; Peruatacamus; A. atunpacha

= Maindroniidae =

Family of silverfishes

Maindroniidae is a small family of silverfish, basal insects belonging to the order Zygentoma. It contains three genera.

Four species of these insects are found in deserts: in Sudan, the Arabian Peninsula, and the Atacama Desert on the west coast of Chile. The distribution of these closely related species suggests that Maindronia is a Gondwanan relict group. In 2020, a new species in this family, Maindronia bashagardensis, was discovered in Hormozgan province, Iran. There are no known existing specimens or illustrations of Maindronia mascatensis.

== Taxonomy ==
It has been suggested that Maindroniidae should be divided in two subfamilies:

- Atacaminae:
  - Atacamus neotropicalis (Wygodzinsky, 1940) - Chile
  - Peruatacamus atunpacha Irish, Zúñiga-Reinoso & Predel, 2025 - Perú
- Maindroniinae:
  - Maindronia bashagardensis Smith & Molero-Baltanás, 2020 – Iran
  - Maindronia beieri Schremmer, 1964 – Sudan
  - Maindronia mascatensis Bouvier, 1897 – Oman and UAE

Nota bene: A binomial authority in parentheses indicates that the species was originally described in a different genus

In 2019, a phylogenetic study using the Cytochrome c oxidase subunit I and the 18S genes showed that Maindronia neotropicalis, inhabiting the Chilean Atacama desert, is an assemblage of five genetic lineages that diverged from a common ancestor around 15 million years ago. All of these five lineages are likely well-separated species, and await formal description.
