= Ctenosciaena =

Scientific classification
- Kingdom: Animalia
- Phylum: Chordata
- Class: Actinopterygii
- Order: Acanthuriformes
- Family: Sciaenidae
- Genus: Ctenosciaena; Fowler & B. A. Bean, 1923

Type species
- Sciaena (Ctenosciaena) dubia Fowler & Bean, 1923

Genus of fishes

Ctenosciaena is a genus of marine ray-finned fishes belonging to the family Sciaenidae, the drums and croakers. These fishes are found in the Western Atlantic and southeastern Pacific Oceans.

== Taxonomy ==
Ctenosciaena was first proposed as a monospecific subgenus of Sciaena in 1923 by the American ichthyologists Henry Weed Fowler and Barton Appler Bean when they described Sciaena (Ctenosciaena) dubia. This taxon was later found to be a junior synonym of Umbrina gracilicirrhus which had been described by the Dutch ichthyologist Jan Marie Metzelaar from the coast of Venezuela. This genus has been placed in the subfamily Sciaeninae by some workers, but the 5th edition of Fishes of the World does not recognise subfamilies within the Sciaenidae which it places in the order Acanthuriformes.

== Etymology ==
Ctenosciaena is a combination of cteno, from ctenoid and Sciaena as Sciaena dubia seemed to have ctenoid scales, most of which had fallen off the type specimen, Sciaena umbra has cycloid scales.

== Species ==
Ctenosciaena has the following two species classified within it:

- Ctenosciaena gracilicirrhus (Metzelaar, 1919) (Barbel drum)
- Ctenosciaena peruviana Chirichigno F., 1969 (Peruvian barbel drum)

== Characteristics ==
Ctenosciaena barbel drums have an oblong, compressed body with a large head which has a large eye and a moderately large mouth, opening just underneath the snout. There is a small, slender, central barbel on the chin which has no pores and has two pairs of pores beside it. The preoperculum may be smooth or have slight serrations. The dorsal fin has a high spiny part and is deeply incised, the incision separating the spiny and soft-rayed parts. The anal fin has a pair of weak spines. The caudal fin ends in a blunt, angular point. The scales are large ctenoid on the bodyand cycloid on the head. The scales of the lateral line reach to the center of the end of the caudal fin. Both species in the genus have maximum published total lengths of 21 cm (8.3 in).

== Distribution and habitat ==
Ctenosciaena has a Pacific species, C. peruviana, which is found off western South America along the coast of Ecuador and Peru, with records from southern Colombia. It occurs over muddy and rocky bottoms at depths between 20 and 324 m (66 and 1,063 ft), while C. gracilicirrhus is found the Caribbean and Western Atlantic from Nicaragua south to southern Brazil at depths between 10 and 130 m (33 and 427 ft) over sandy or muddy bottoms in coastal waters.
