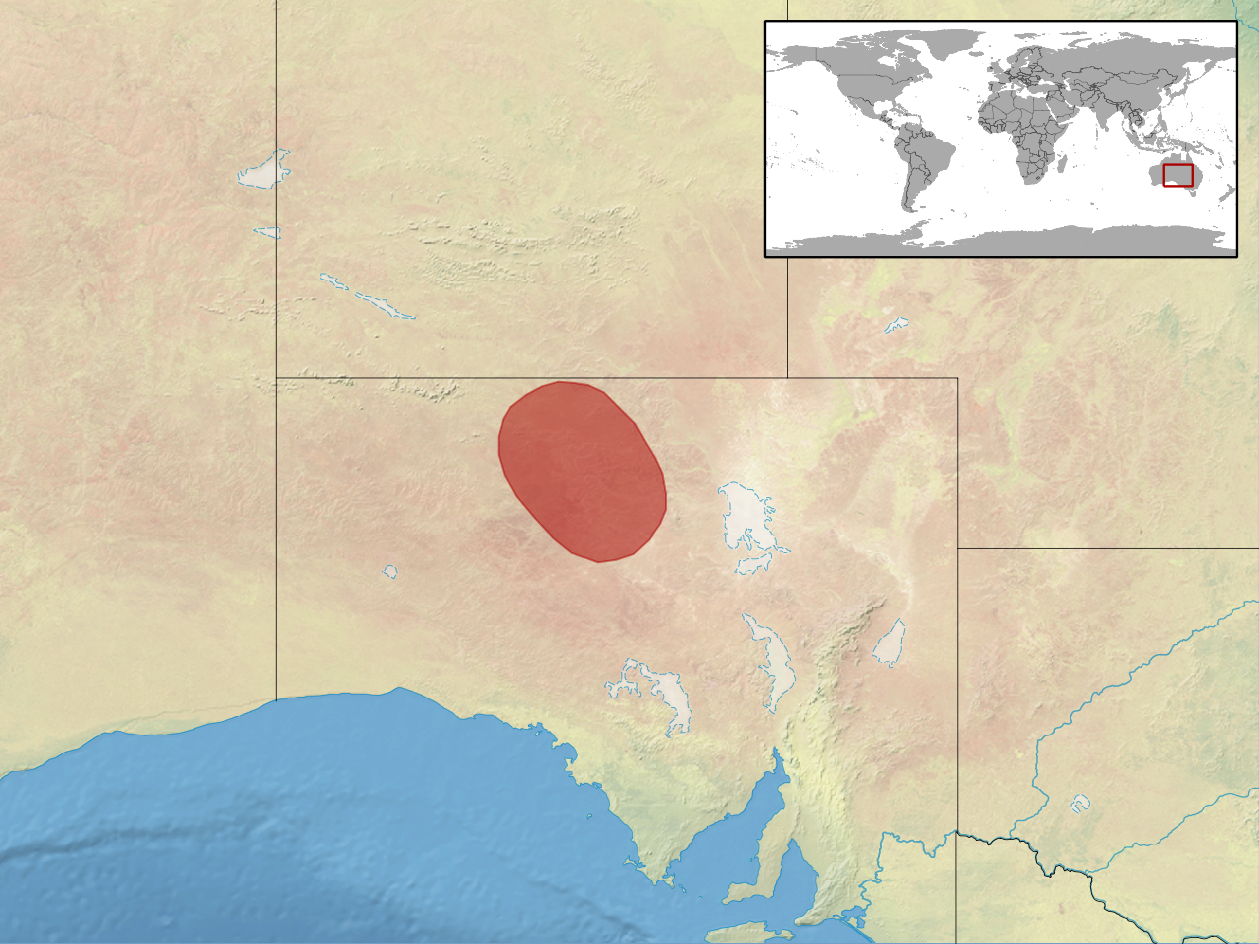
- Ctenophorus tjantjalka habitats

Conservation status
- Least Concern (IUCN 3.1)

Scientific classification
- Kingdom: Animalia
- Phylum: Chordata
- Class: Reptilia
- Order: Squamata
- Suborder: Iguania
- Family: Agamidae
- Genus: Ctenophorus
- Species: C. tjantjalka

Binomial name
- Ctenophorus tjantjalka Johnston, 1992

= Ctenophorus tjantjalka =

Ochre Dragon

Species of lizard

Ctenophorus tjantjalka, also known as the ochre dragon, is a species of agamid lizard occurring on low, weathered, crumbling outcrops, and stony hills in arid South Australia, from the Painted Hills north-west to the base of the Everard Ranges.

== Taxonomy ==
Ctenophorus tjantjalka is a saxicolous ecomorph, agamid lizard, belonging to the Ctenophporus decresii group.

Scientific Classification
Domain	Eukaryota
Kingdom	Animalia
Phylum	Chordata
Class	Reptilia
Order	Squamata
Suborder	Iguana
Family	Agamidae
Genus	Ctenophorus
Species	C. tjantjalka

== Description ==
C. tjantjalka or Ochre Dragon is characterized as a robust, moderate-sized lizard which differs from other Ctenophorus species on the basis of having the smallest snout length (73mm), lack of banding on tail, and presence of vertebral keel. The body of the lizard is depressed with proportionately large forelimbs.

== Habitat And Distribution ==
The physical and behavioral traits of the Ctenophorus species vary depending on their respective habitats within Australia. This lizard inhabits the interior regions of South Australia, widespread between the Idulkana Range and Oodnadatta in the North, and Coober Pedy and Davenport Range in the South.

All specimens are found located either within or at close proximity to rocky areas.

== Behavior And Diet ==
Members of the C. Decresii Species group portray sexually dimorphic dorsal coloration. Male C. Tjantjalka are uniform light blue with salmon flanks and lack the dark lateral bands on the tail, while females have presence of pale spots.

They feed on ants in arid zones. Ants constitute of majority of the diet by percentage, while grasshoppers, termites, hermipterans, scorpions, spiders, beetles, and wasps are eaten in a smaller amount.

Common Predators of the Ctenophorus are Brown falcons, Australian Kestrels, Bustards, Large snakes and the monitor lizards.
