= Cercus =

Paired appendages on the rear-most segments of many arthropods

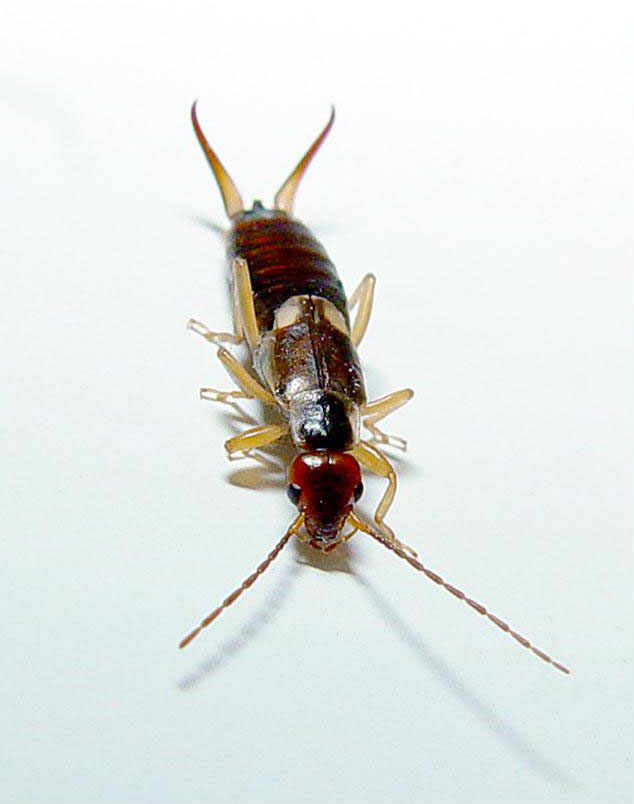
Earwig with large cerci (top)

Cerci (sg.: cercus) are paired appendages usually on the rear-most segments of many arthropods, including insects and symphylans. Many forms of cerci serve as sensory organs, but some serve as pinching weapons or as organs of copulation. In many insects, they simply may be functionless vestigial structures.

In basal arthropods, such as silverfish, the cerci originate from the eleventh abdominal segment. As segment eleven is reduced or absent in the majority of arthropods, in such cases, the cerci emerge from the tenth abdominal segment. It is not clear that other structures so named are homologous. In the Symphyla they are associated with spinnerets.

== Morphology and functions ==
Most cerci are segmented and jointed, or filiform (threadlike), but some take very different forms. Some Diplura, in particular Japyx species, have large, stout forcipate (pincer-like) cerci that they use in capturing their prey.

The Dermaptera, or earwigs, are well known for the forcipate cerci that most of them bear, though species in the suborders Arixeniina and Hemimerina do not. It is not clear how many of the Dermaptera use their cerci for anything but defense, but some definitely feed on prey caught with the cerci, much as the Japygidae do.

Crickets have particularly long cerci while other insects have cerci that are too small to be noticeable. However, it is not always obvious that small cerci are without function; they are rich in sensory cells and may be of importance in guiding copulation and oviposition.

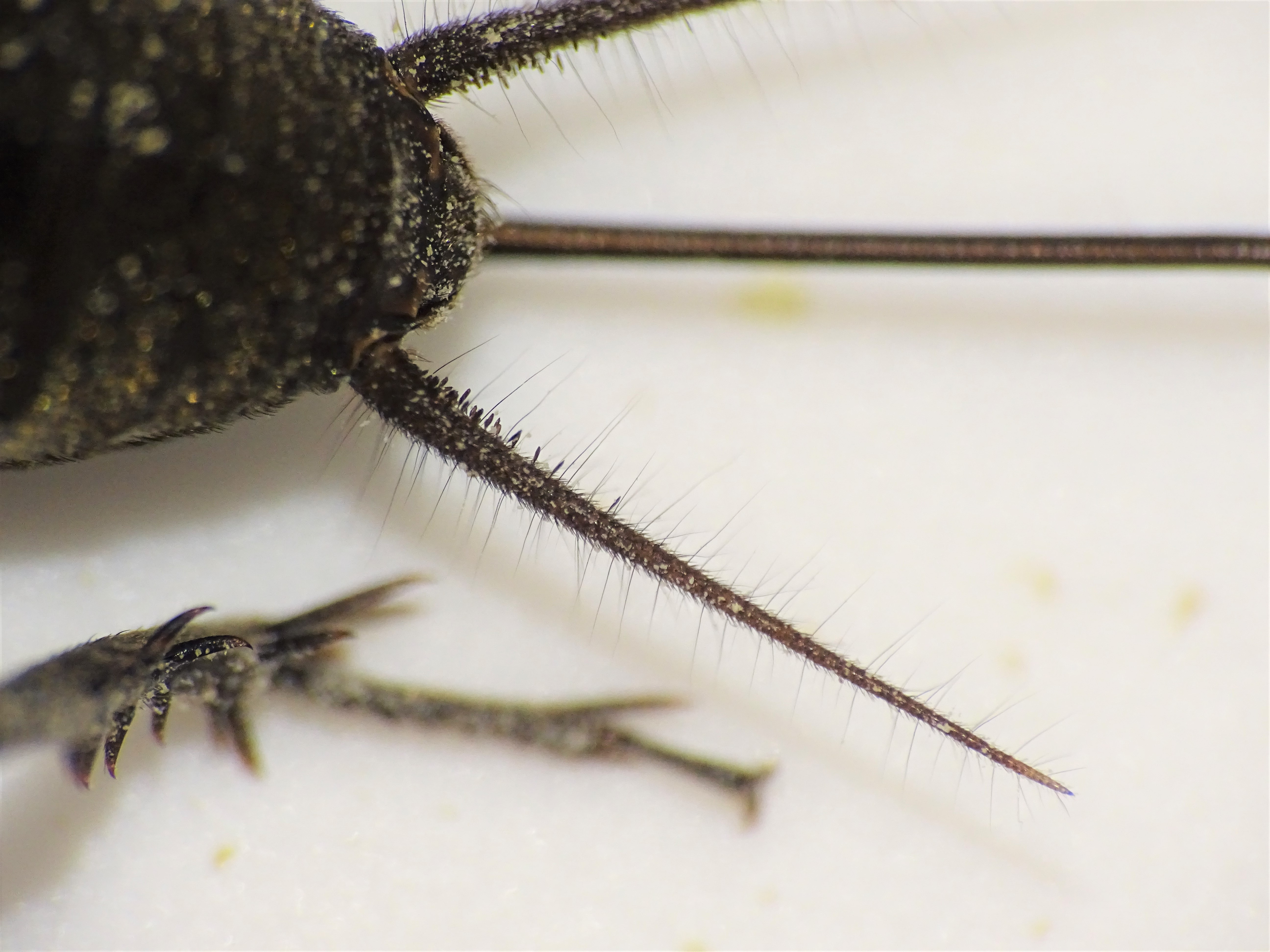
Cercus of an adult female Gryllus pennsylvanicus

In groups such as crickets and cockroaches, cerci play important sensory roles. They have been shown to be sensitive to puffs of air and low-frequency vibration, and thus trigger anti-predatory responses such as escape in response to certain predators. In field crickets, the range of frequency detection by the cerci spans from infrasonic sound to nearly 1 kHz. In crickets, higher-frequency sound such as stridulation and ultrasonic bat calls are picked up by a separate tympanal organ, not the cerci.

Some hexapods such as mayflies, silverfish and diplurans possess an accompanying third central tail filament which extends from the tip of the abdomen. This is referred to as the terminal filament and is not regarded as a cercus.

Aphids have tube-like cornicles or siphunculi that are sometimes mistaken for cerci but are not morphologically related to cerci.

== Evolutionary origin ==
Like many insect body parts, including mandibles, antennae and stylets, cerci are thought to have evolved from what were legs on the primal insect form, a creature that may have resembled a velvet worm, Symphylan or a centipede, worm-like with one pair of limbs for each segment behind the head or anterior tagma.

== Gallery ==
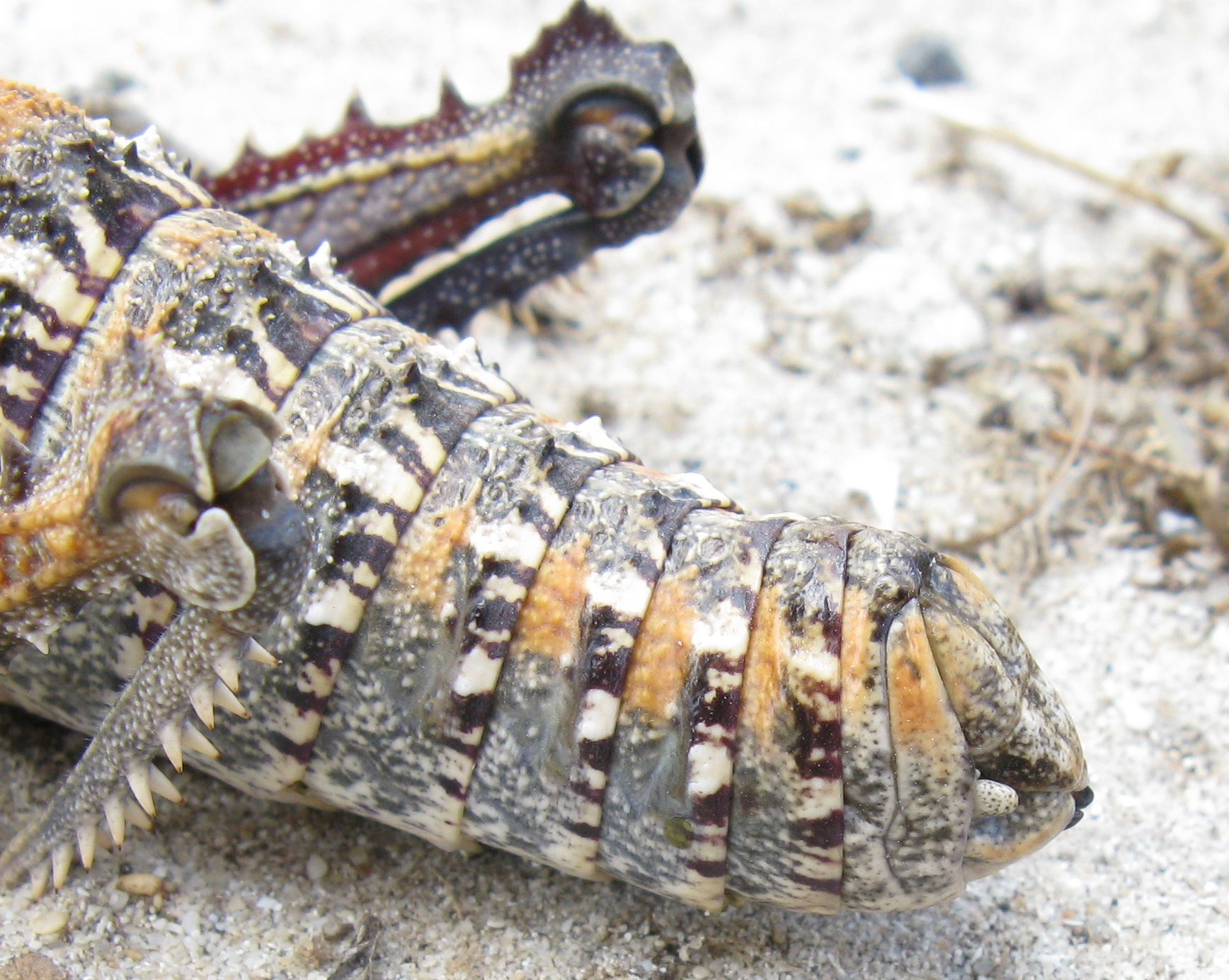
Short cerci on abdomen of a species of pamphagid grasshopper

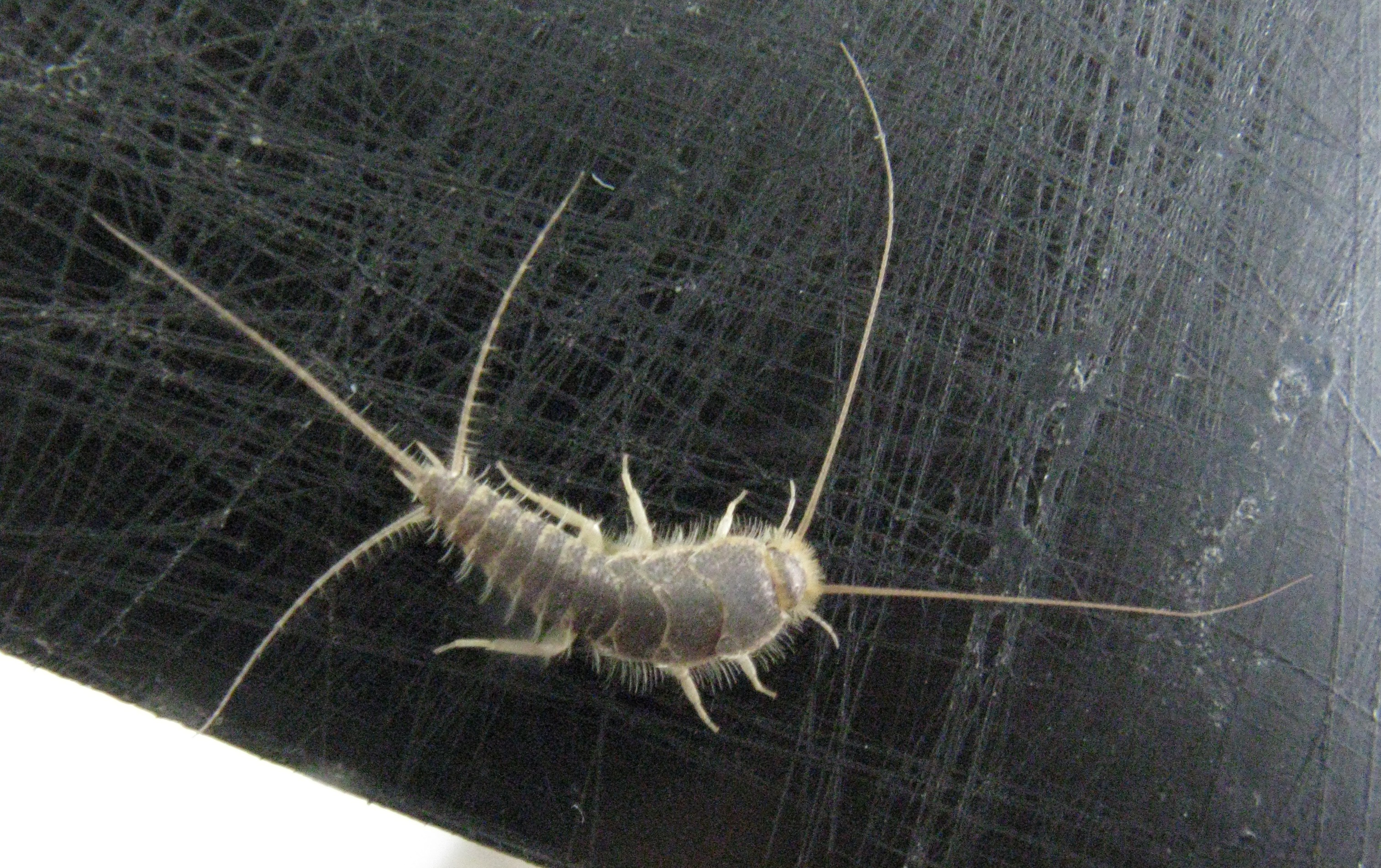
Long sensory cerci on Ctenolepisma, flanking the median cerciform appendage and paired stylets

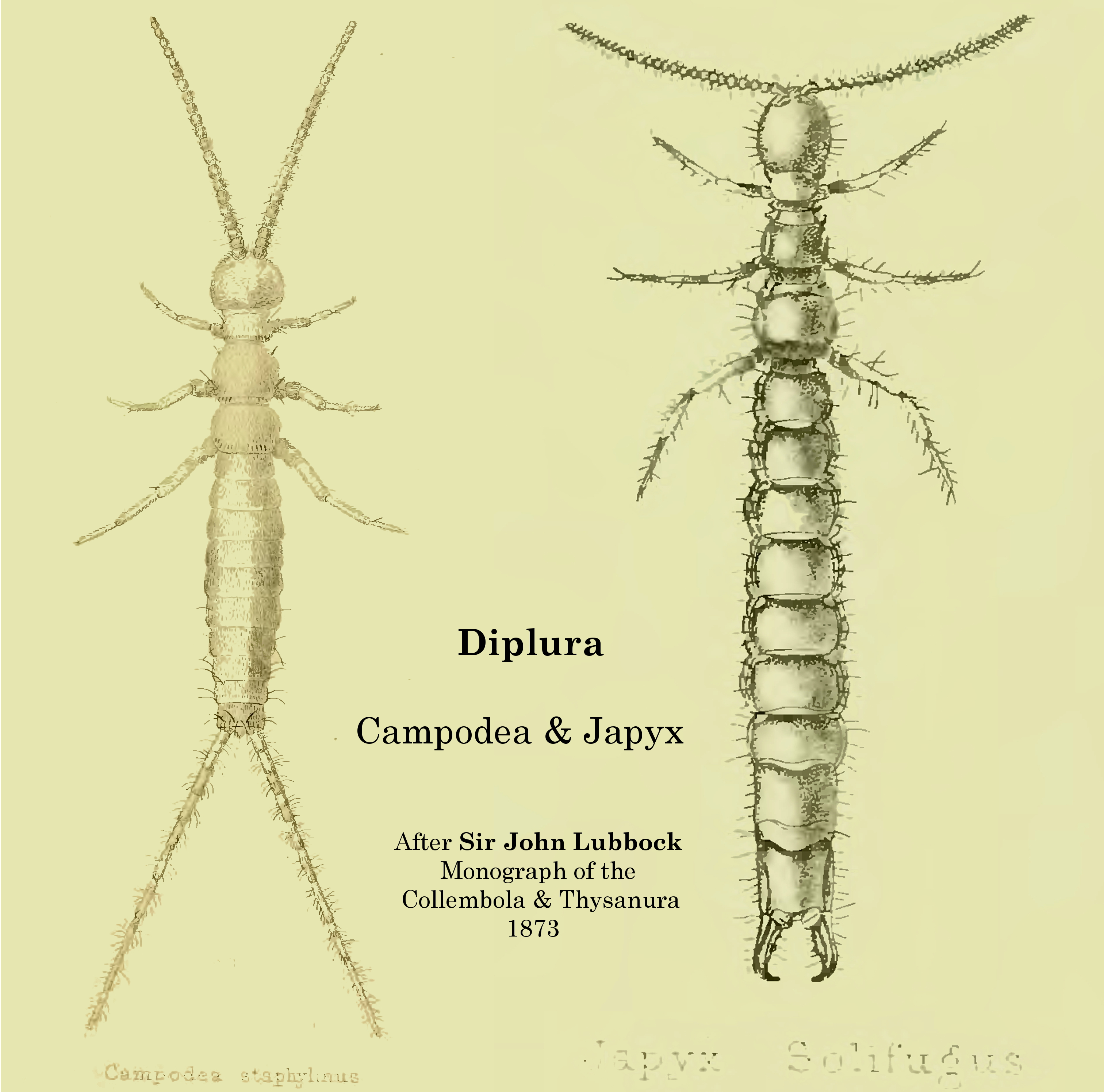
Two forms of Diplura, illustrating cerci with sensory glandular function, as contrasted with forcipate forms of cerci used in predation
