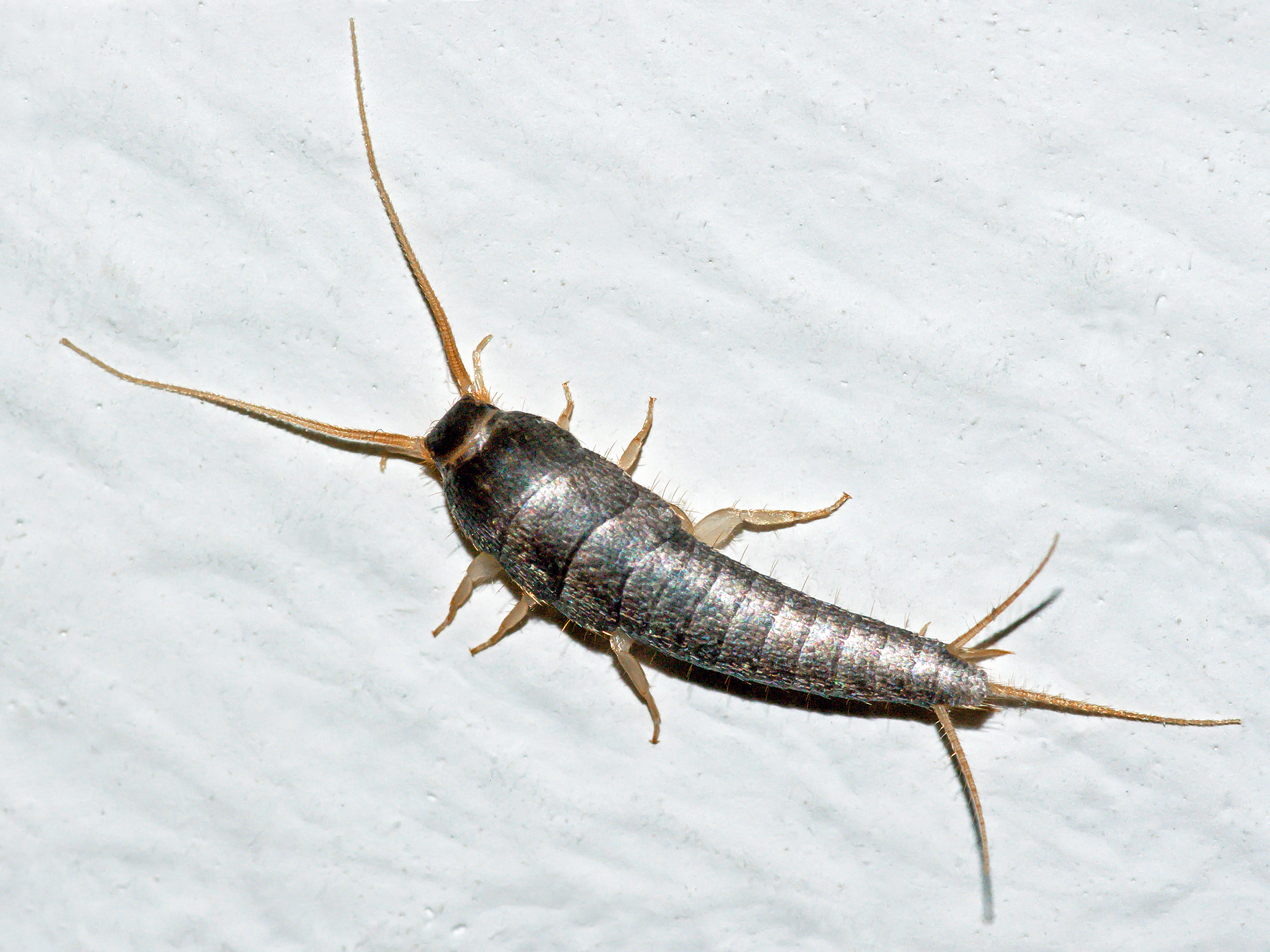

Scientific classification
- Kingdom: Animalia
- Phylum: Arthropoda
- Clade: Pancrustacea
- Class: Insecta
- Order: Zygentoma
- Family: Lepismatidae
- Genus: Lepisma
- Species: L. saccharinum

Binomial name
- Lepisma saccharinum Linnaeus, 1758

Synonyms
- Lepisma saccharina Linnaeus, 1758; Forbicina plana Geoffroy, 1762; Lepisma vulgaris Scopoli, 1763; Tinea argentina Baker, 1780; Lepisma semicylindrica De Geer, 1782; Lepisma saccharifera Mohr, 1786 (missp.); Lepisma quercetorum Wygodzinsky, 1945

= Silverfish =

Small land insect in the order Zygentoma

The silverfish (Lepisma saccharinum) is a species of small, primitive, wingless insect in the order Zygentoma (formerly Thysanura). Its common name derives from the insect's silvery light grey colour, combined with the fish-like appearance of its movements. The scientific name (L. saccharinum) indicates that the silverfish's diet consists of carbohydrates such as sugar or starches. While the common name silverfish is used throughout the global literature to refer to various species of Zygentoma, the Entomological Society of America restricts use of the term solely to Lepisma saccharinum.

== Description ==
The silverfish is a nocturnal insect typically 7–10 mm (0.3–0.4 in) long. Its abdomen tapers at the end, giving it a fish-like appearance. The newly hatched are whitish, but develop a greyish hue and metallic sheen as they get older. It has two long cerci and one terminal filament at the tip of the abdomen between the cerci. It also has two small compound eyes, although other members of Zygentoma are eyeless, such as the family Nicoletiidae.

The silverfish, like other species in Apterygota, is wingless. It has long antennae, and moves in a wiggling motion that resembles the movement of a fish. This, coupled with its appearance and silvery scales, inspires its common name. Silverfish can regenerate lost terminal filaments and antennae within four weeks. Silverfish typically live for up to three years.

The silverfish is an agile runner that avoids light.

== Distribution ==
Silverfish are a cosmopolitan species, found in Africa, the Americas, Australia, Eurasia, and parts of the Pacific. They inhabit moist areas, requiring a relative humidity between 75% and 95%. In urban areas, they can be found in attics, basements, bathtubs, showers, kitchens, sinks, libraries, and classrooms. They can live in old books.

== Reproduction and life cycle ==
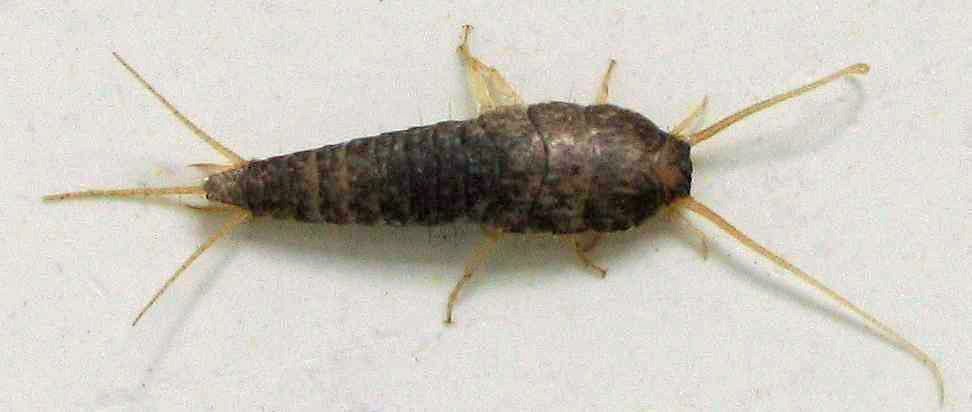
A silverfish

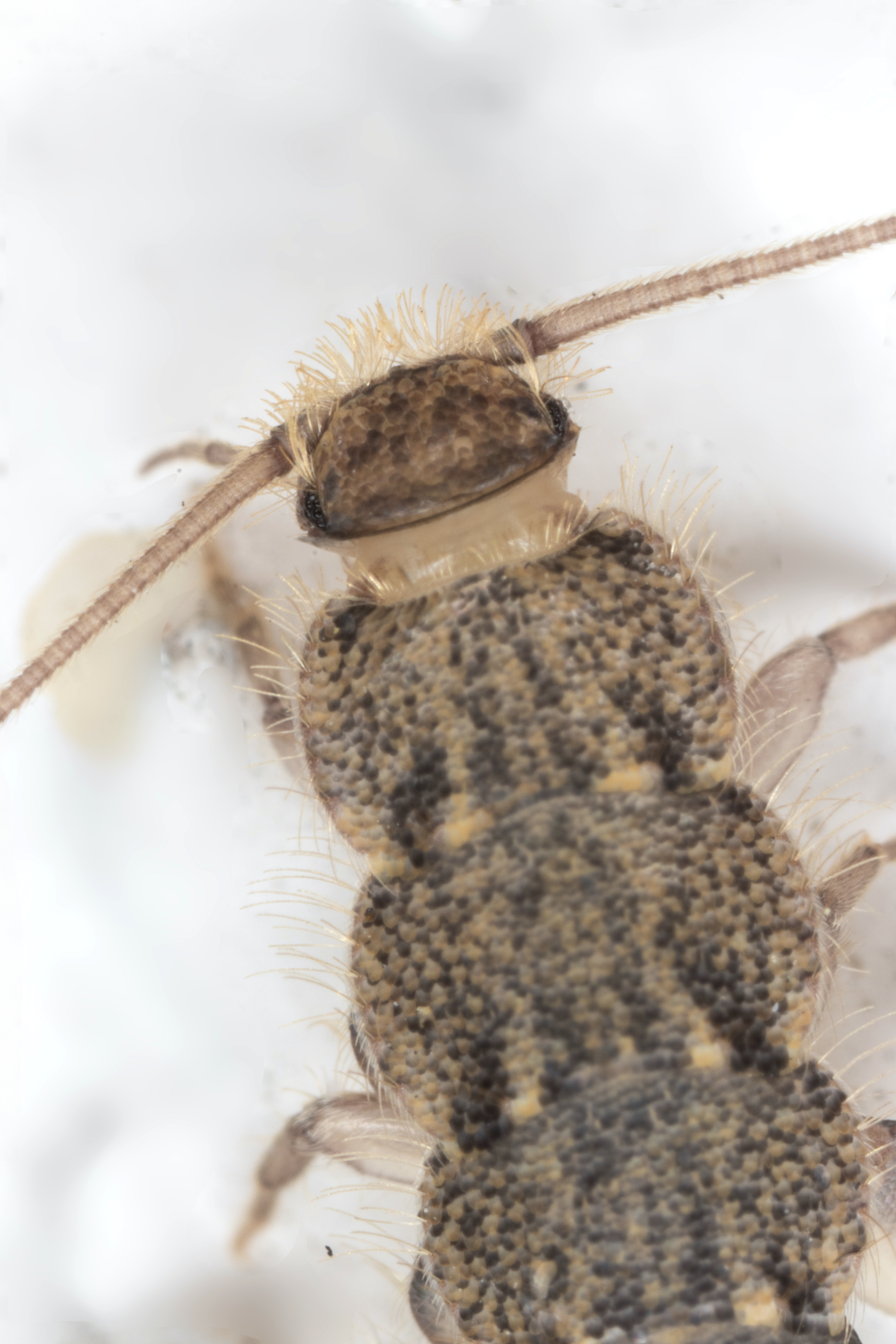
Silverfish head close-up

Before silverfish reproduce, they carry out a ritual involving three phases, which may last over half an hour. In the first phase, the male and female stand face to face, their vibrating antennae touching, then repeatedly back off and return to this position. In the second phase, the male runs away and the female chases him. In the third phase, the male and female stand side by side and head to tail, with the male vibrating his tail against the female. Finally, the male lays a spermatophore, a sperm capsule covered in gossamer, which the female takes into her body via her ovipositor to fertilize her eggs. The female lays groups of fewer than 60 eggs at once, deposited in small crevices. The eggs are oval-shaped, whitish, about 0.8 mm (0.031 in) long, and take between two weeks and two months to hatch. A silverfish usually lays fewer than 100 eggs in her lifetime.

When the nymphs hatch, they are whitish in colour, and look like smaller adults. As they moult, young silverfish develop a greyish appearance and a metallic sheen, eventually becoming adults after three months to three years. They may go through 17 to 66 moults in their lifetimes, sometimes 30 in a single year, many more than most insects. Silverfish are among the few types of insect that continue to moult after reaching adulthood, with an estimated lifespan of around 2 to 8 years.

== Ecology ==
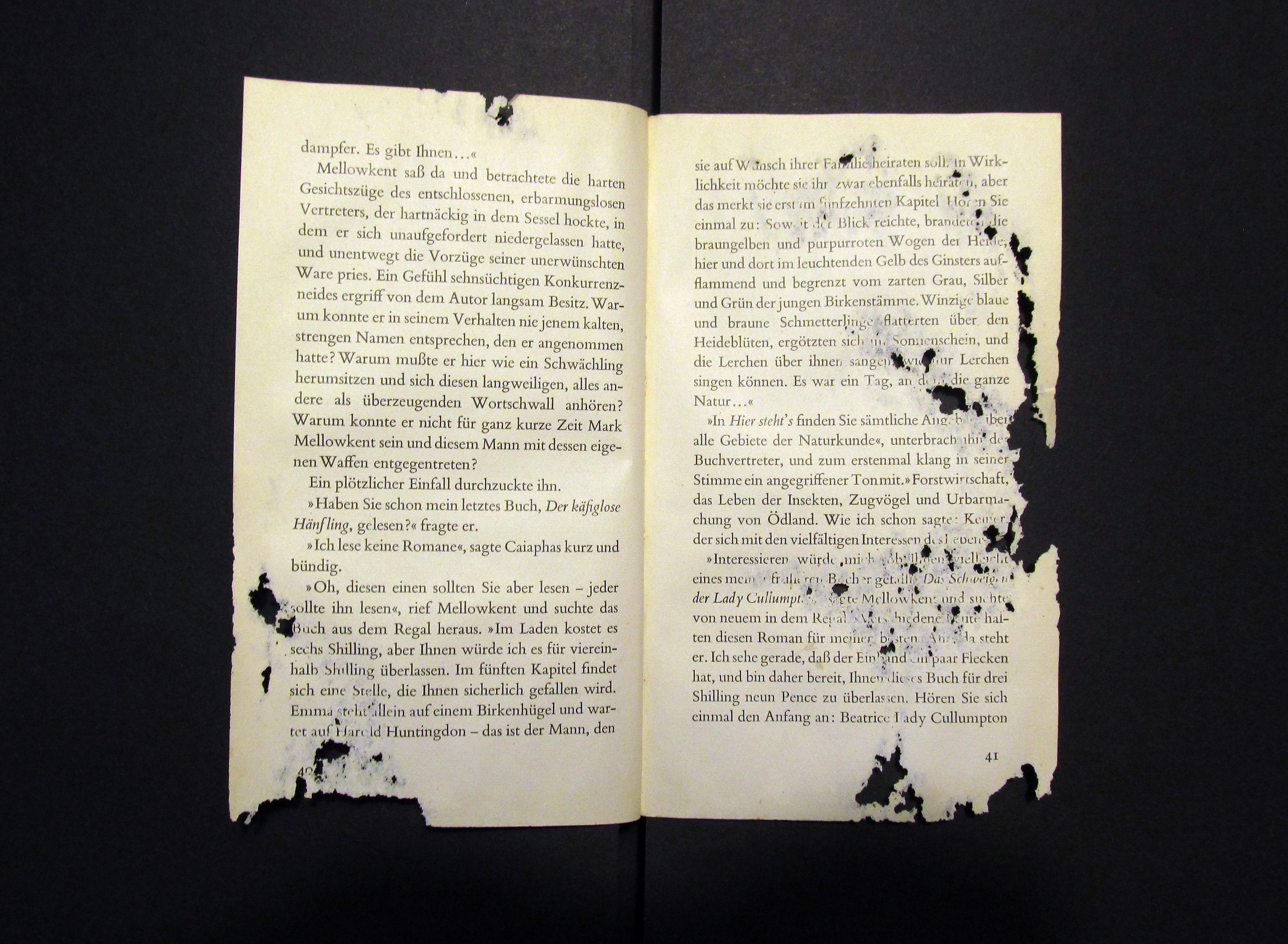
Pages in a book damaged by silverfish that consumed portions of it.

Silverfish are able to digest cellulose (a component of paper) by themselves, thanks to the cellulase produced by their midgut. They consume matter that contains polysaccharides, such as starches and dextrin in adhesives. These include book bindings, carpet, clothing, coffee, dandruff, glue, hair, some paints, paper, photos, plaster, and sugar. They will damage wallpaper in order to consume the paste. Silverfish can also cause damage to tapestries. Other substances they may eat include cotton, dead insects, linen, silk, leftover crumbs, or even their own exuviae (moulted exoskeleton). During famine, a silverfish may even consume leather and synthetic fabrics. Silverfish can live for a year or more without eating if water is available.

Silverfish are considered household pests, due to their consumption and destruction of property. However, although they are responsible for the contamination of food and other types of damage, they do not transmit disease. House centipedes and spiders such as the spitting spider Scytodes thoracica are known to be predators of silverfish.

The essential oil of the Japanese cedar Cryptomeria japonica has been investigated as a repellent and insecticide against L. saccharinum, with promising results: filter paper impregnated with oil repelled 80% of silverfish at a gas concentration of 0.01 mg/cm^{3}, and an exposure of 0.16 mg/cm^{3} for 10 hours caused a 100% mortality rate.

== Etymology and nomenclature ==
The scientific name for the species is Lepisma saccharinum (originally saccharina; Linnaeus' 1758 description here), due to its tendency to eat starchy foods high in carbohydrates and protein, such as dextrin. However, the insect's more common name comes from its distinctive metallic appearance and fish-like shape. While the scientific name was established by Carl Linnaeus in his 1758 10th edition of Systema Naturae, the common name has been in use since at least 1855. Most authors have historically treated the nomenclatural gender of Lepisma as feminine (also as specified in ICZN Direction 71 issued in 1957), but in 2018 the International Commission on Zoological Nomenclature reversed this decision, issuing a new formal ruling (ICZN Opinion 2427) stating the gender of Lepisma (and all genera with that ending) is neuter, following ICZN Article 30, which resulted in changes to the spelling of several well-known species, including Lepisma saccharinum.

== Similar species ==
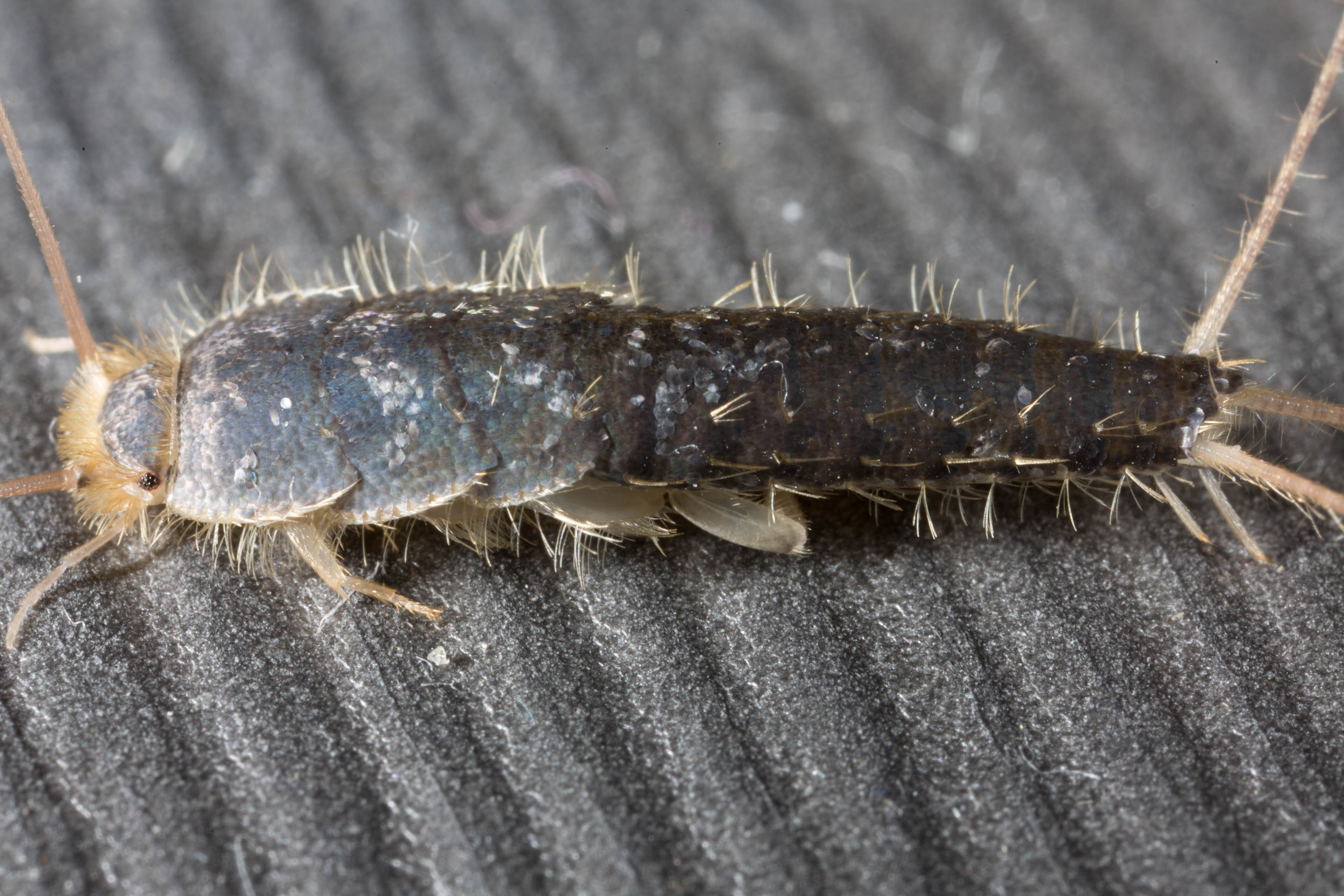
Ctenolepisma species

Other similar insect species are also known as silverfish. Two other silverfish are common in North America, Ctenolepisma longicaudatum and Ctenolepisma quadriseriatum. Ctenolepisma urbanum is known as the urban silverfish.

The Australian species most commonly referred to as silverfish is a different lepismatid, Acrotelsella devriesiana. The firebrat (Thermobia domestica) is like a silverfish, but with a mottled gray and brown body.
