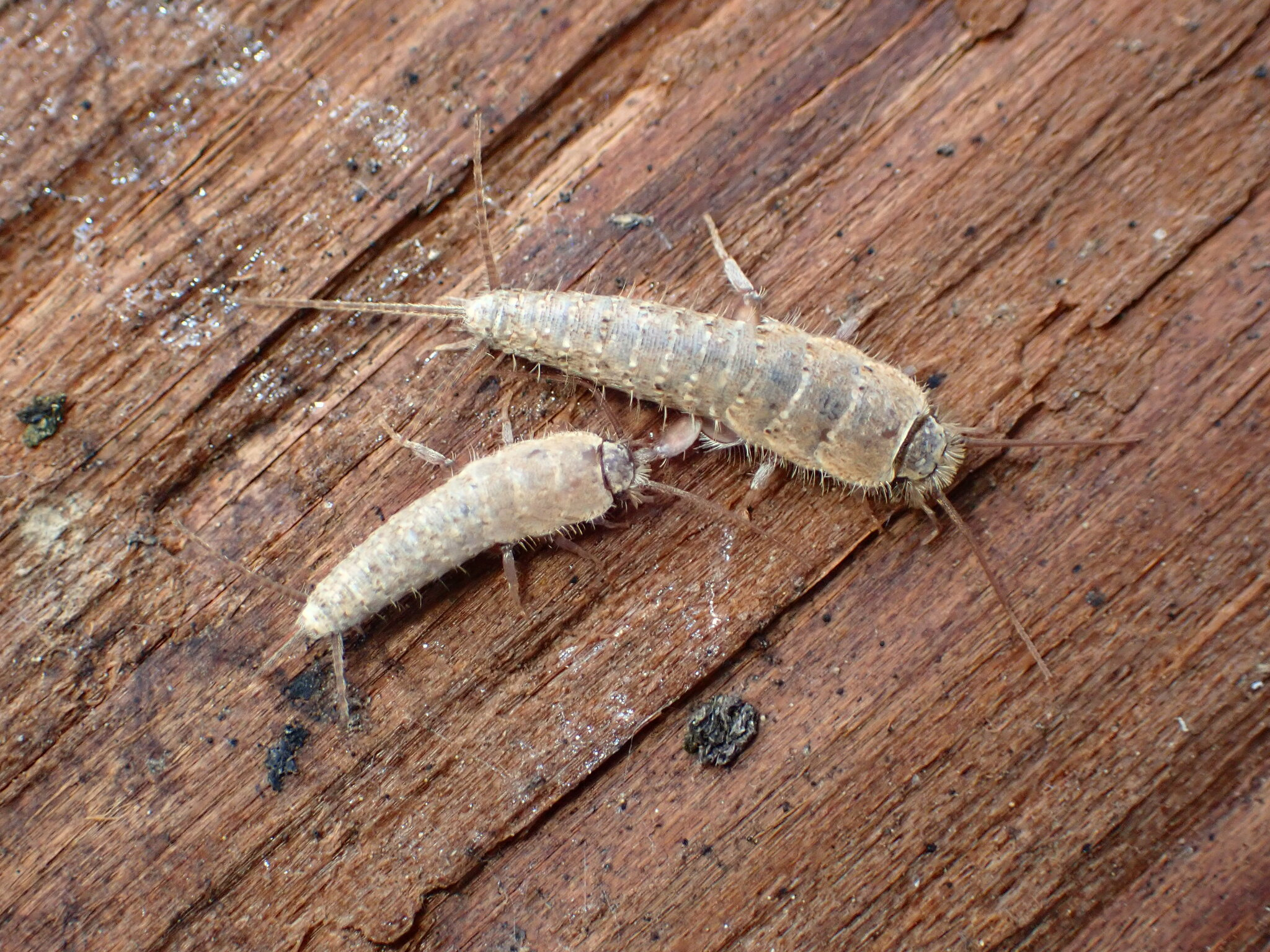
- Ctenolepisma ciliatum

Scientific classification
- Kingdom: Animalia
- Phylum: Arthropoda
- Class: Insecta
- Order: Zygentoma
- Family: Lepismatidae
- Genus: Ctenolepisma
- Species: C. ciliatum

Binomial name
- Ctenolepisma ciliatum (Dufour, 1831)

= Ctenolepisma ciliatum =

Species of silverfish

Ctenolepisma ciliatum is a species of silverfish of the order Zygentoma. Described from Spain, it is a common species in subarid habitats of the Mediterranean bassin from Portugal to Western Asia. It is very close to C. longicaudatum. Its dorsal pattern is usually uniformly brownish or greyish with iridescences, or with two or four longitudinal fringes along the abdomen. Anatomic/morphologic differences with related species involve microscopic characters as setation or shape and distribution of scales.
