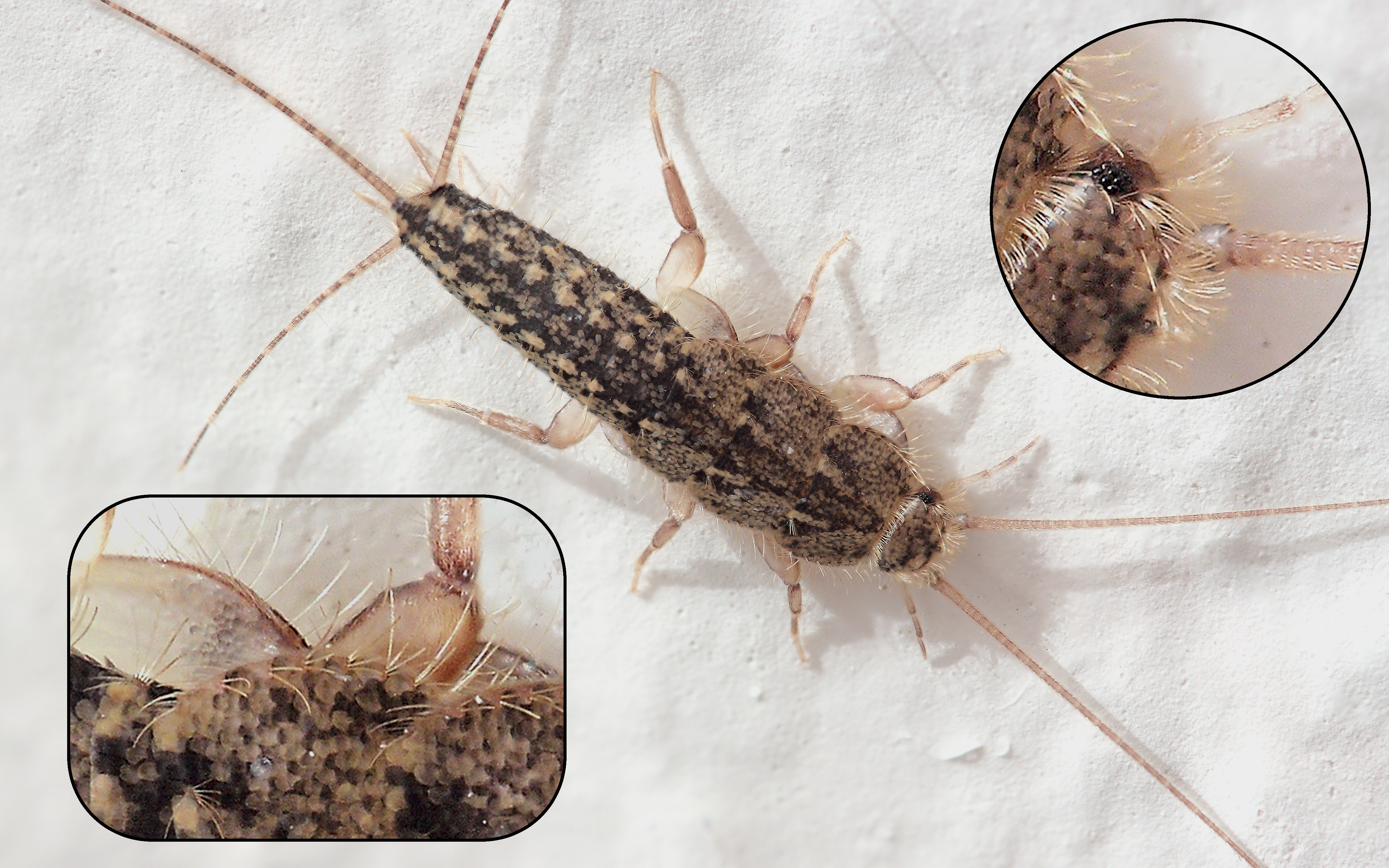

Scientific classification
- Kingdom: Animalia
- Phylum: Arthropoda
- Clade: Pancrustacea
- Class: Insecta
- Order: Zygentoma
- Family: Lepismatidae
- Genus: Ctenolepisma
- Species: C. lineatum

Binomial name
- Ctenolepisma lineatum (Fabricius, 1775)

Synonyms
- Lepisma lineata Fabricius, 1775; Lepisma vittata Fabricius, 1798; Lepisma subvittata Guérin, 1838; Lepisma annuliseta Lucas, 1840; Lepisma parisiensis Nicolet, 1847; Lepisma quadriseriata Packard, 1873; Lepisma reticulata Schött, 1897

= Ctenolepisma lineatum =

Species of silverfish

Ctenolepisma lineatum, the four-lined silverfish, is a species of silverfish of the order Zygentoma. It is rather stouter and less shiny with all the appendages (antennae and 3 "tails") being noticeably longer. The abdomen is often marked with dark brown lines.

This species is native to southern Europe but is now found throughout most of the world, aside from polar and cooler temperate regions (e.g. the British Isles), as an accidental introduction. It is found both indoors and outdoors and can be a nuisance pest.

Recent studies on this species in Europe suggest that, due to speciation, there is enough geographical variation to justify splitting into several species, with one form already having been given specific status as Ctenolepisma almeriense from south-eastern Spain.

Lepisma pilifera Lucas, 1840, which was considered a synonym of C. lineatum, is now treated as a synonym of Thermobia aegyptiaca (Lucas, 1840).
