= Karl Escherich =

Karl Leopold Escherich (18 September 1871 – 22 November 1951) was a German entomologist and professor of zoology. Known as a pioneer of applied entomology and expert in termites, he was rector of Ludwig-Maximilians-Universität München (LMU Munich) from 1933 to 1936.

Escherich was born in Schwandorf, Bavaria, to parents Hermann N. Escherich and Katharina von Stengel. His older brother Georg Escherich would become a noted forester and politician.

He studied medicine in Munich and Würzburg, graduating in 1893. After gaining his postdoctoral qualification in Strasbourg in 1901, he received a professorship at the Department of Forest Zoology in Tharandt in 1907, which had been orphaned since the death of Hinrich Nitsche. In 1914, he joined the Chair of Applied Zoology at LMU Munich, where he succeeded August Pauly. In 1917, he was elected a member of the Academy of Sciences Leopoldina.

After a 1911 trip to the United States, he conceived a plan to redesign applied entomology in Germany after the American model. In 1913, he co-founded the German Society for Applied Entomology.

Karl Escherich was one of the few forestry academics who took part in the early Hitler movement of the inflation period. He joined the Nazi Party in 1921, and participated in the 1923 Munich Putsch. In 1924, he still participated in the election campaign for the "Volkischer Block", but remained remote from the new NSDAP.

For his research, Karl Escherich received the Goethe Medal for Art and Science.

To commemorate its founder, the German Society for Applied Entomology awards the Escherich Medal for outstanding achievements in the field of entomology.
