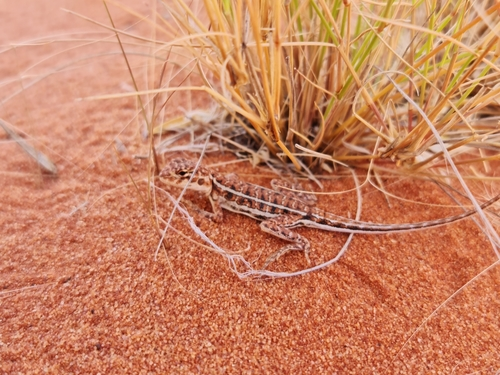

Scientific classification
- Kingdom: Animalia
- Phylum: Chordata
- Class: Reptilia
- Order: Squamata
- Suborder: Iguania
- Family: Agamidae
- Genus: Ctenophorus
- Species: C. kartiwarru

Binomial name
- Ctenophorus kartiwarru Edwards & Hutchinson, 2023

= Ctenophorus kartiwarru =

Species of lizard

Ctenophorus kartiwarru, commonly known as the Red-backed Sand Dragon, is a species of lizard from the family Agamidae. The species was discovered in 2023 as a split from the Mallee military dragon (Ctenophorus fordi).

== Description ==
Ctenophorus kartiwarru is a small lizard endemic to Australia that grows to about 3 in (76 mm) in length. The maximum snout-vent length (SVL) is 54 and 52 mm (2.1 and 2.0 in) in males and females respectively. They have relatively long tails and legs, tail length can be between 248 – 275 (% SVL) for males and between 248 – 264 (% SVL) for females, whereas hind leg length can be between 93 – 108 for males and 99 – 108 for females (% SVL). They have between 12 and 16 femoral pores that go halfway to the knee.

The ventral side is white-coloured. However, males have faint or absent black throat markings and a small, distinct chest patch that is often narrowly split down the middle. Some females will have faint black throat and chest markings. The chest markings may extend as a black stripe along the front of the upper arms.

The dorsal side is sandy-red with prominent pale dorsolateral stripes overlying blackish lateral blotches. In males, the dorsolateral stripe is pale yellow, while in females it is whiter. Additionally, there are small lateral speckles, matching the colour of the dorsolateral stripe, between the blackish lateral blotches

== Etymology ==
The red-backed sand dragon's specific name Ctenophorus kartiwarru is derived from the local Indigenous Australian Dieri language in the South Australian section of the species range. The word kartiwarru is the local name for 'a red-backed lizard, about 3 inches long'.

== Taxonomy ==
The red-backed sand dragon was only discovered in 2023 by Danielle Edwards and Mark Hutchinson. It previously had been identified as a form of the Mallee military dragon (Ctenophorus fordi). It is in the dragon family Agamidae, within the Ctenophorus maculatus complex. Kartiwarru is the local Dieri word for 'a red-backed lizard about 3 inches long' used to describe the species.

== Range ==
Ctenophorus kartiwarru is found throughout central Australia, including northwest New South Wales, southwest Queensland and, east-central South Australia. Specifically they have been found in the Simpson Strzelecki Dunefields (SSD) and Gawler (GAW) IBRA Bioregions, including within the Strzelecki Desert (SSD05), Torrens (GAW06) and Roxby (GAW07) sub-regions.

== Habitat ==
Ctenophorus kartiwarru live in areas of sparse vegetation cover on inland soft sand dunes. The primary vegetation cover is sandhill cranegrass (Zygochloa paradoxa).

== Conservation ==
The red-backed sand lizard is of least concern as it is common within its range.
