= Ctenophorus chapmani =

Conservation status
- Least Concern (IUCN 3.1)

Scientific classification
- Kingdom: Animalia
- Phylum: Chordata
- Class: Reptilia
- Order: Squamata
- Suborder: Iguania
- Family: Agamidae
- Genus: Ctenophorus
- Species: C. chapmani

Binomial name
- Ctenophorus chapmani (Storr, 1977)
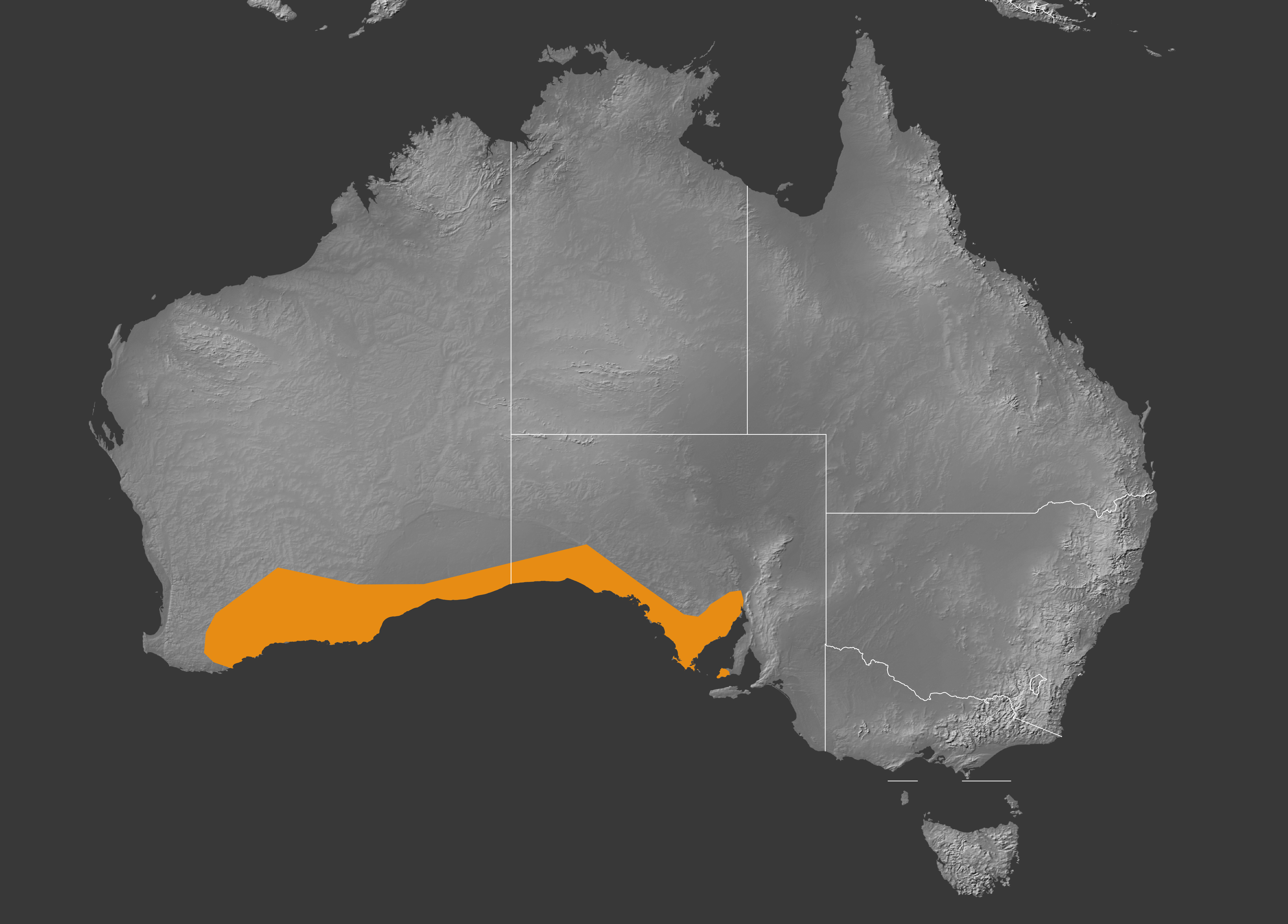
- Distribution of Ctenophorus chapmani

Synonyms
- Amphibolurus adelaidensis chapmani (Storr, 1977); Rankinia chapmani (Storr, 1977); Tympanocryptis adelaidensis chapmani (Houston & Hutchinson, 1998)

Species of lizard

Ctenophorus chapmani, commonly known as Chapman's dragon, southern heath dragon, or Bight heath dragon, is a species of agamid lizard occurring in sandplains with heath or mallee across southern Australia.

It was formerly considered to be a subspecies of Ctenophorus adelaidensis.
