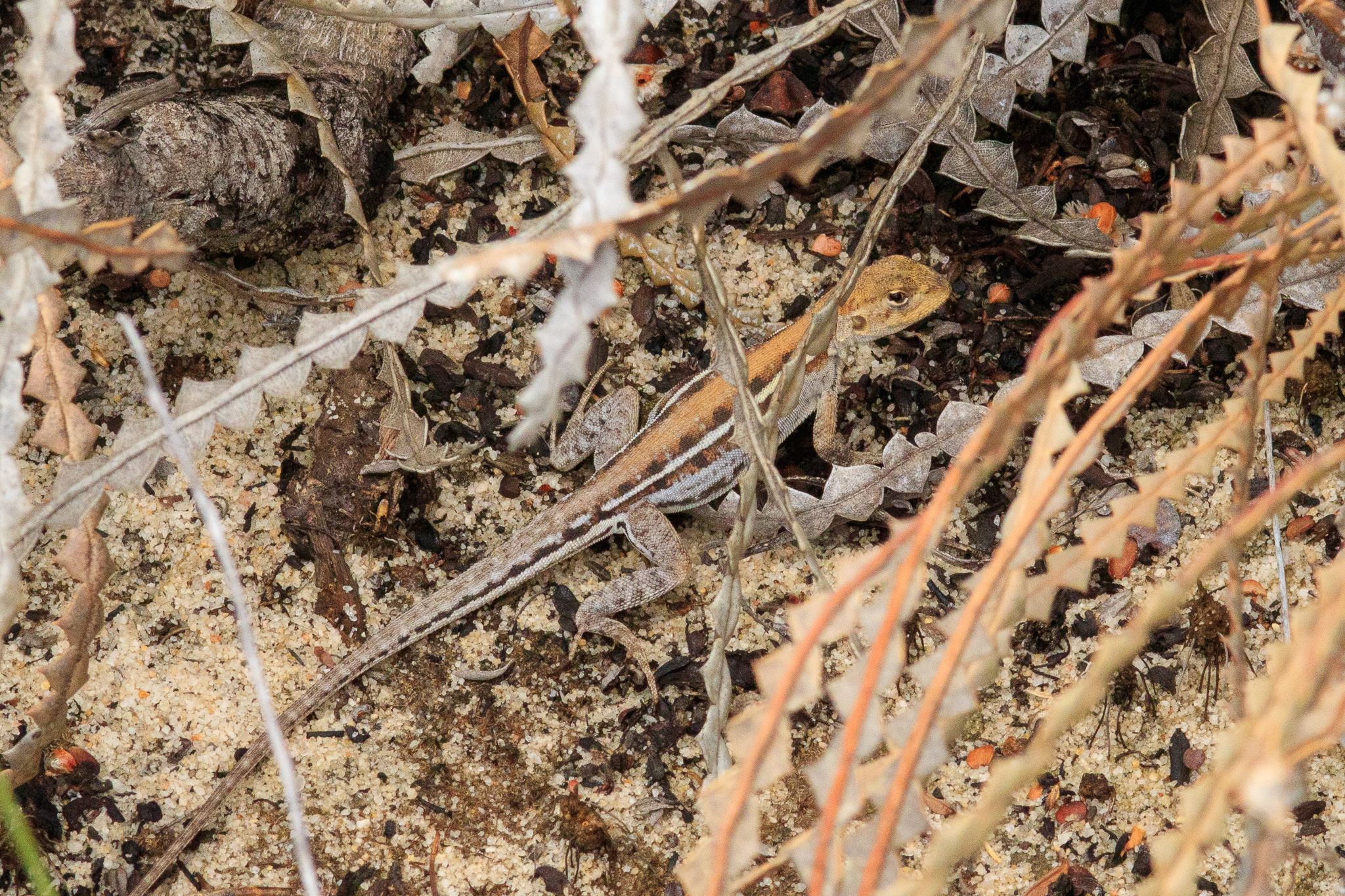

Conservation status
- Least Concern (IUCN 3.1)

Scientific classification
- Kingdom: Animalia
- Phylum: Chordata
- Class: Reptilia
- Order: Squamata
- Suborder: Iguania
- Family: Agamidae
- Genus: Ctenophorus
- Species: C. maculatus

Binomial name
- Ctenophorus maculatus (Gray, 1831)

Subspecies
- C. m. badius C. m. dualis C. m. griseus C. m. maculatus

Synonyms
- Amphibolurus maculatus (Gray, 1831); Phthanodon maculatus (Gray, 1831); Uromastyx maculatus (Gray, 1831); Grammatophora gaimardii (Duméril & Bibron, 1837)

= Ctenophorus maculatus =

Species of lizard

Ctenophorus maculatus, commonly known as the spotted military dragon, spotted dragon, or spotted sand-dragon is a species of agamid lizard occurring in semi-arid to arid shrublands and hummock grasslands of Western Australia and a small part of South Australia.
