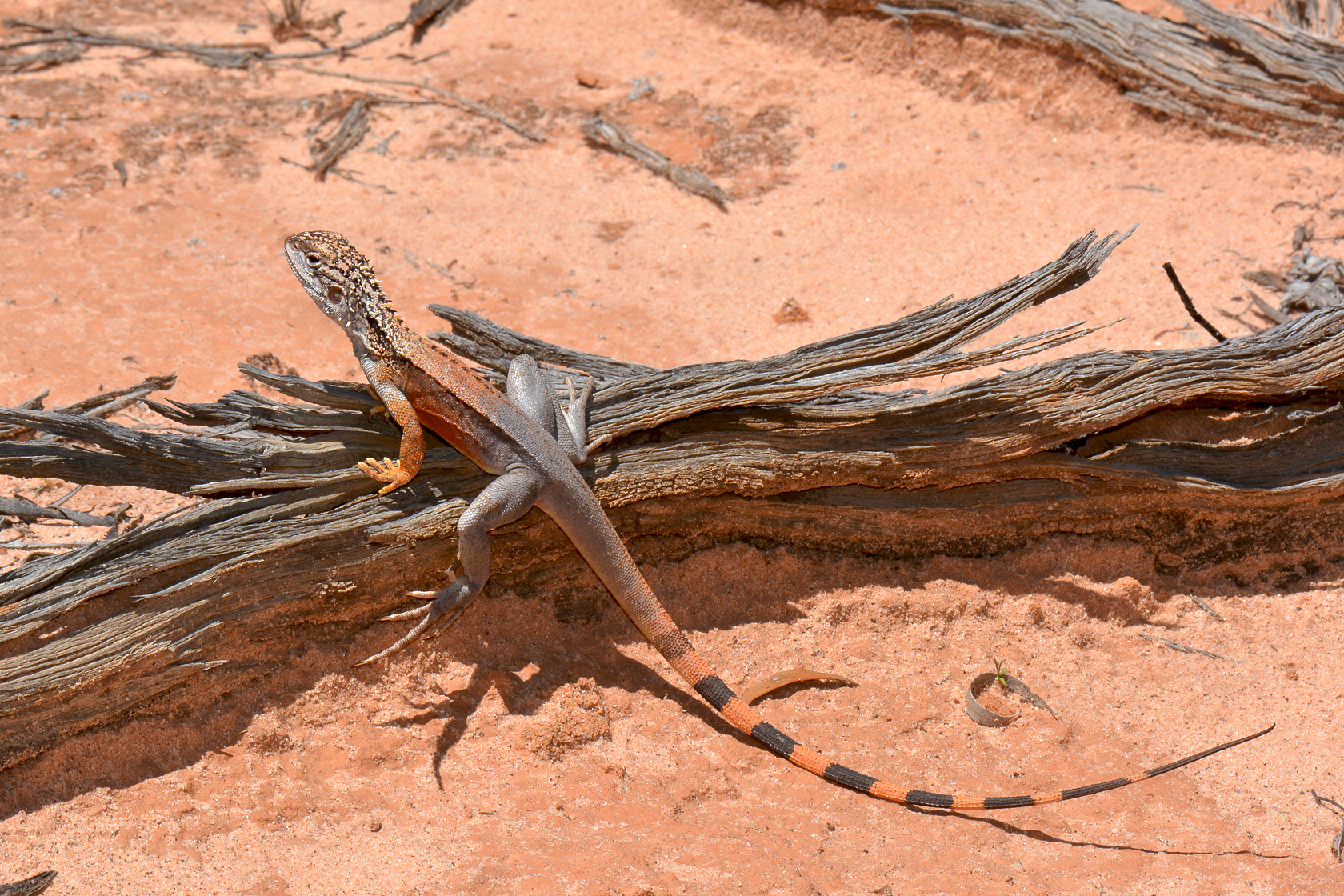

Conservation status
- Least Concern (IUCN 3.1)

Scientific classification
- Kingdom: Animalia
- Phylum: Chordata
- Class: Reptilia
- Order: Squamata
- Suborder: Iguania
- Family: Agamidae
- Genus: Ctenophorus
- Species: C. cristatus

Binomial name
- Ctenophorus cristatus (Gray, 1841)

Synonyms
- Amphibolurus cristatus (Gray, 1841); Grammatophora cristata (Gray, 1841); Licentia cristata (Gray, 1841)

= Ctenophorus cristatus =

Crested dragon

Species of lizard

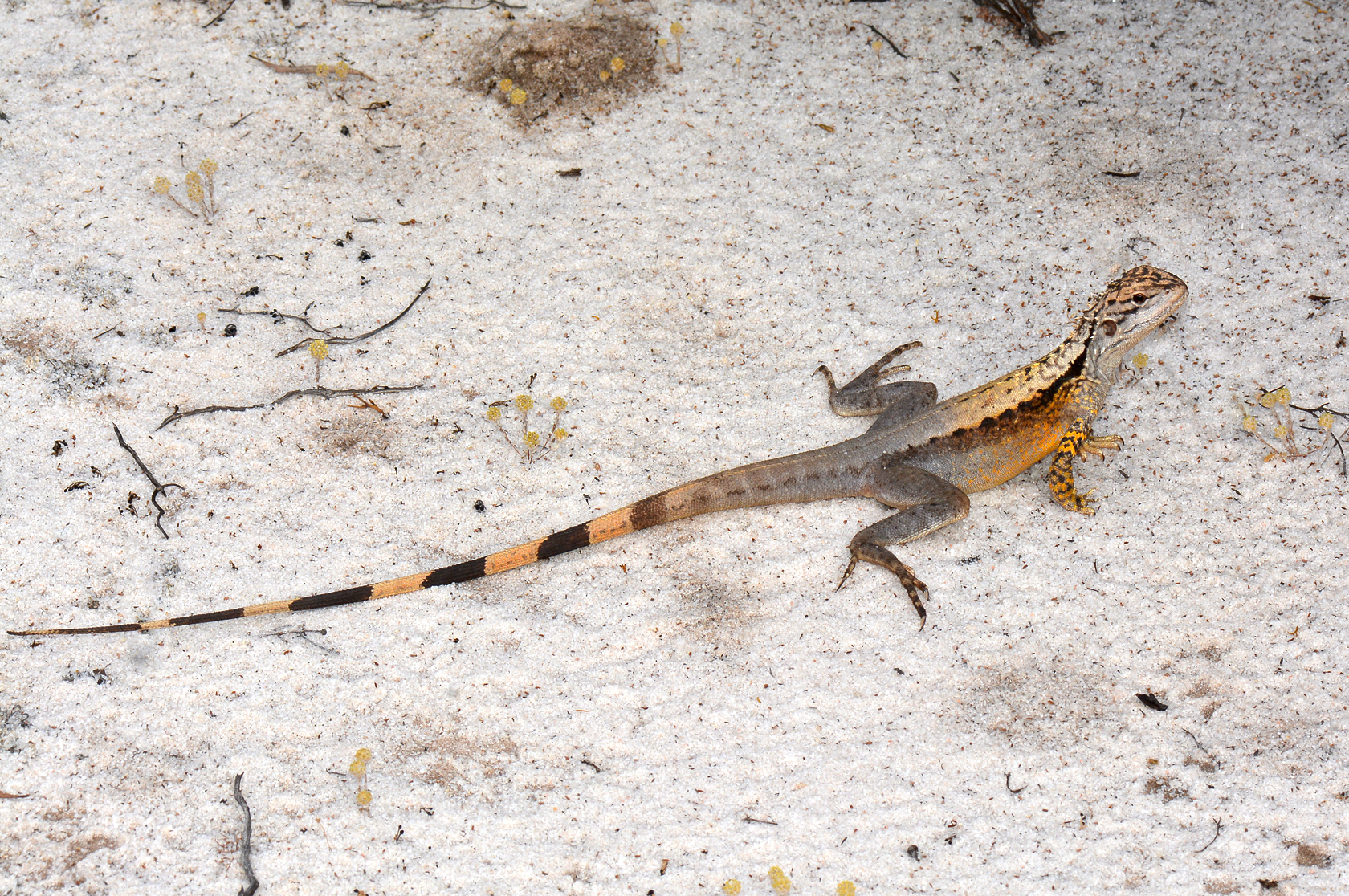
Ctenophorus cristatus

Ctenophorus cristatus, commonly known as the crested dragon, bicycle dragon or crested bicycle-dragon, is a species of agamid lizard occurring in semi-arid woodlands in south-western Australia.
