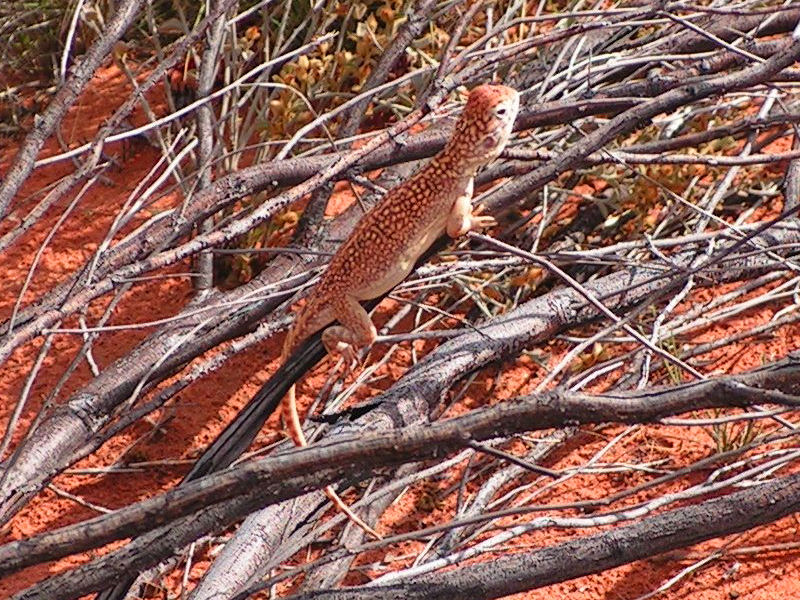
- Male, Uluru, Northern Territory

Conservation status
- Least Concern (IUCN 3.1)

Scientific classification
- Kingdom: Animalia
- Phylum: Chordata
- Class: Reptilia
- Order: Squamata
- Suborder: Iguania
- Family: Agamidae
- Genus: Ctenophorus
- Species: C. reticulatus

Binomial name
- Ctenophorus reticulatus (JE Gray, 1845)

= Ctenophorus reticulatus =

Species of lizard

Ctenophorus reticulatus, the western netted dragon or western netted ground-dragon, is a species of lizard in the family Agamidae. It is found in South Australia, Western Australia and southern Northern Territory.

== Description ==
C. reticulatus has a snout-to-vent length of 108 mm. It has a blunt snout, short limbs, and round head. The adult males are red with black reticula; the females are paler with elongated dark blotches, while the juveniles are olive-grey.

C. reticulatus is most closely related to the central netted dragon Ctenophorus nuchalis.
