= Yinnietharra rock dragon =

Conservation status
- Least Concern (IUCN 3.1)

Scientific classification
- Kingdom: Animalia
- Phylum: Chordata
- Class: Reptilia
- Order: Squamata
- Suborder: Iguania
- Family: Agamidae
- Genus: Ctenophorus
- Species: C. yinnietharra

Binomial name
- Ctenophorus yinnietharra (Storr, 1981)

Synonyms
- Amphibolurus yinnietharra Storr, 1981

Species of lizard

The Yinnietharra rock dragon or Yinnietharra crevice-dragon (Ctenophorus yinnietharra) is a lizard in the family Agamidae. The species was first described by Glen Milton Storr in 1981. It is endemic to Western Australia.
