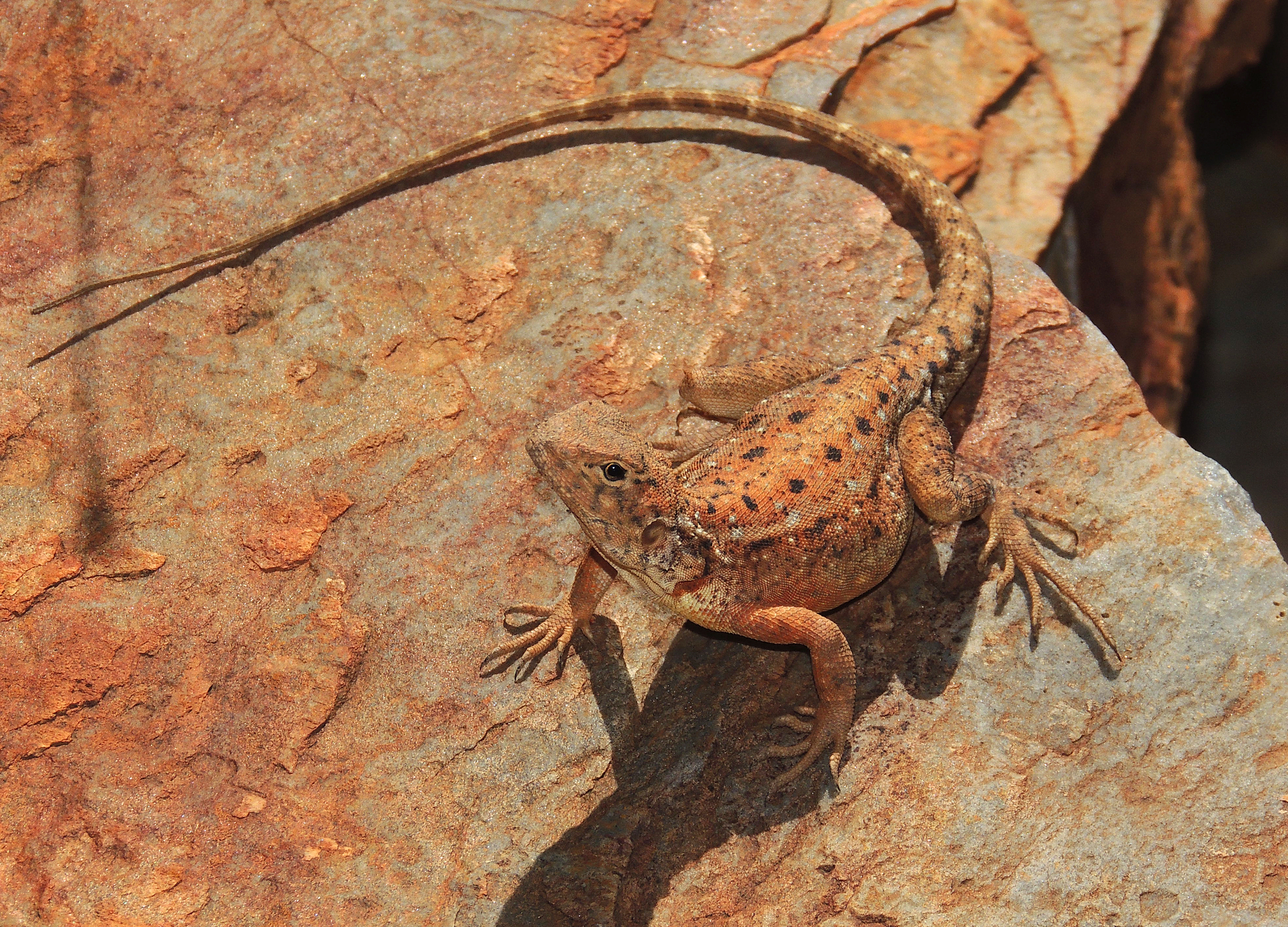

Conservation status
- Least Concern (IUCN 3.1)

Scientific classification
- Kingdom: Animalia
- Phylum: Chordata
- Class: Reptilia
- Order: Squamata
- Suborder: Iguania
- Family: Agamidae
- Genus: Ctenophorus
- Species: C. slateri

Binomial name
- Ctenophorus slateri (Storr, 1967)

Synonyms
- Amphibolurus caudicinctus slateri (Storr, 1967); Tachyon slateri Wells & Wellington, 1985; Ctenophorus caudicinctus slateri Even, 2005

= Ctenophorus slateri =

Species of lizard

Ctenophorus slateri, commonly known as Slater's dragon, is a species of agamid lizard occurring in ranges of the Northern Territory in Australia.

It was formerly considered to be a subspecies of Ctenophorus caudicinctus.
