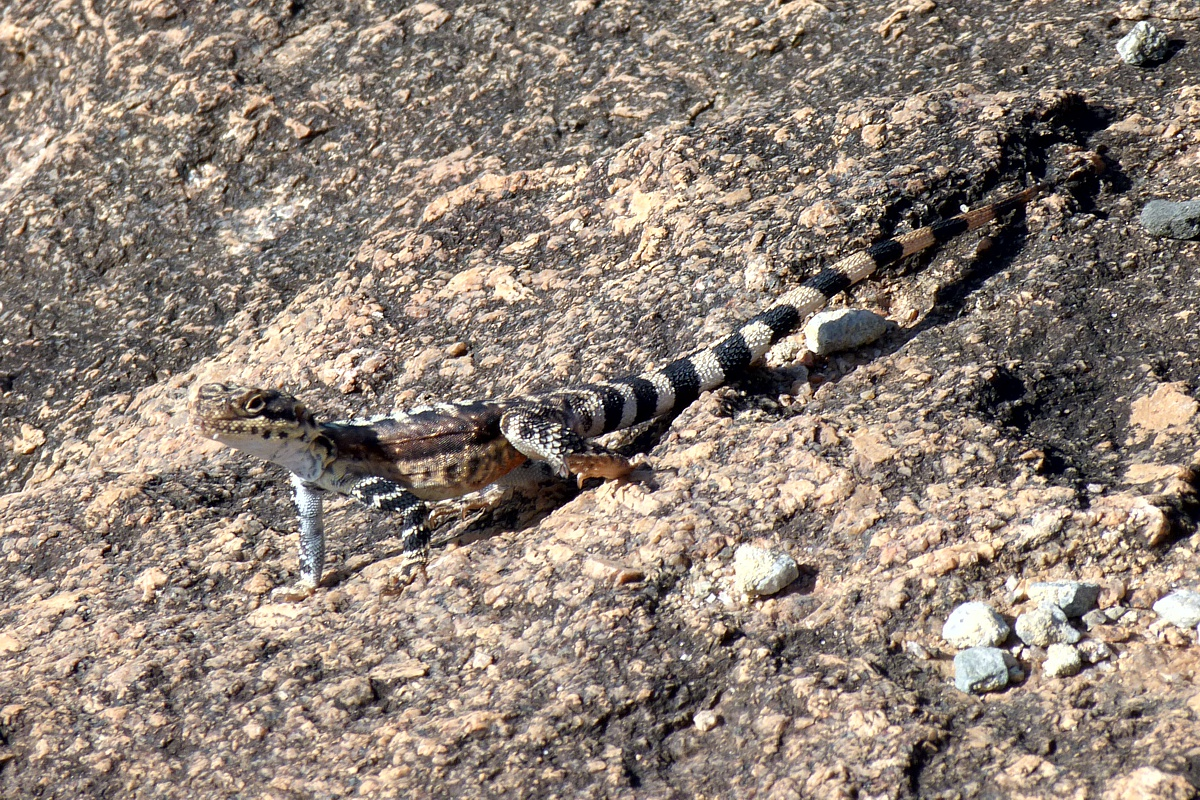
- Ornate crevice-dragon on Wave Rock near Hyden

Conservation status
- Least Concern (IUCN 3.1)

Scientific classification
- Kingdom: Animalia
- Phylum: Chordata
- Class: Reptilia
- Order: Squamata
- Suborder: Iguania
- Family: Agamidae
- Genus: Ctenophorus
- Species: C. ornatus

Binomial name
- Ctenophorus ornatus (Gray, 1845)
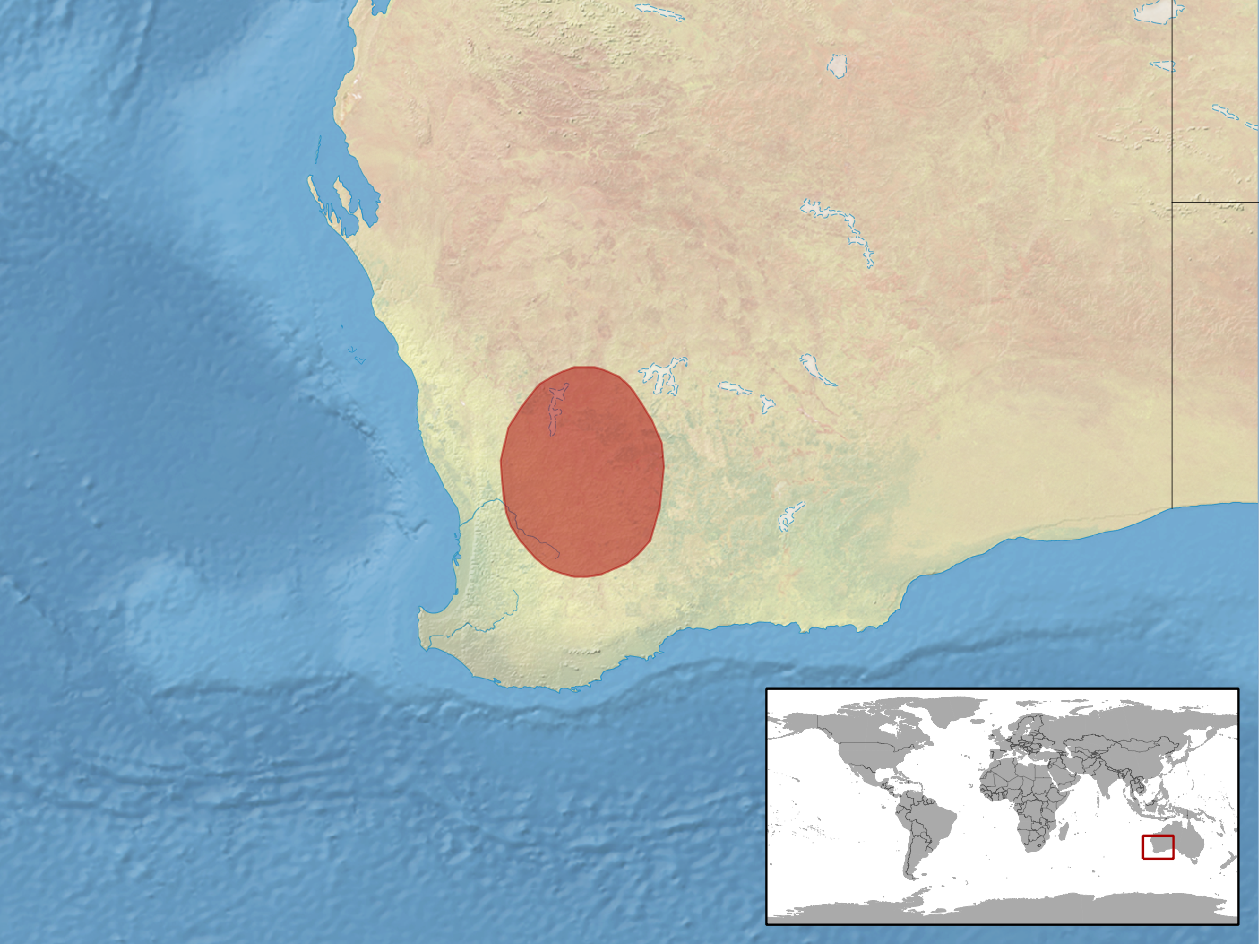

Synonyms
- Grammatophora ornatus Gray, 1845; Amphibolurus ornatus (Gray, 1845); Amphibolurus tibialis Ahl, 1926

= Ctenophorus ornatus =

Species of lizard

Ctenophorus ornatus, the ornate crevice-dragon or ornate dragon, is a species of lizard in the family Agamidae. It is found on granite outcrops of Western Australia.

The species is a member of a diverse genus, Ctenophorus, that contains a group known as rock dragons. It can be distinguished from the others by its greatly flattened body, around 290 mm, with a snout-to-vent length of 95 mm, and a distinctly banded tail.

Ctenophorus ornatus is common on granite outcrops, where it shelters under slabs and boulders, especially in undisturbed areas. When out in the open, often basking on warm rocks, it displays a head-bobbing characteristic seen in many related species.

The distribution range of this species extends from the Goldfields to the Darling Range, and to the southern coastline. It is recorded at the Archipelago of the Recherche, offshore granite islands, and a reddish form is noted in the Murchison district.
