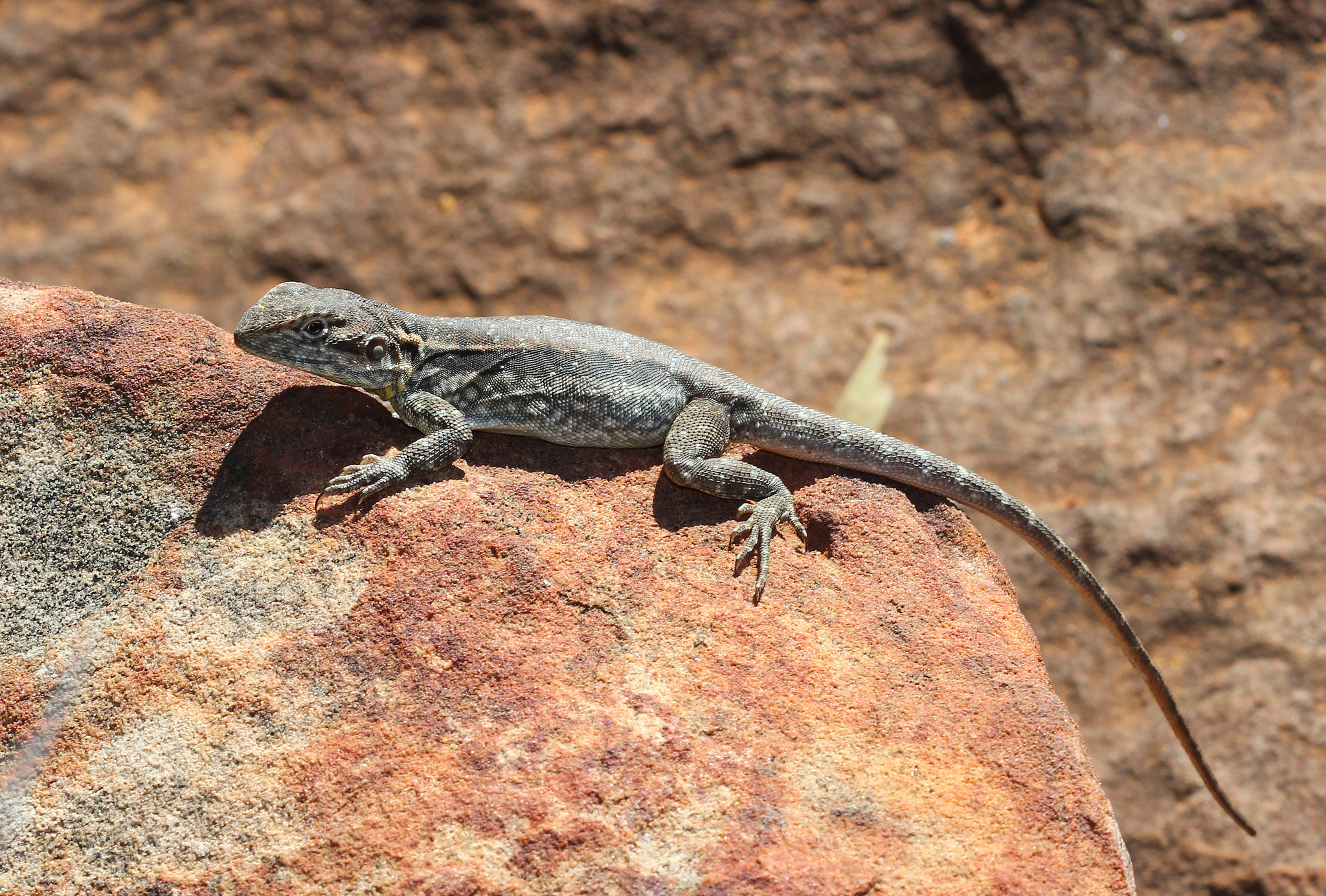

Scientific classification
- Domain: Eukaryota
- Kingdom: Animalia
- Phylum: Chordata
- Class: Reptilia
- Order: Squamata
- Suborder: Iguania
- Family: Agamidae
- Genus: Ctenophorus
- Species: C. modestus

Binomial name
- Ctenophorus modestus (Ahl, 1926)

= Ctenophorus modestus =

Species of lizard

Ctenophorus modestus is a species of agamid lizard occurring in South Australia.

It was formerly considered to be a subspecies of Ctenophorus decresii.
