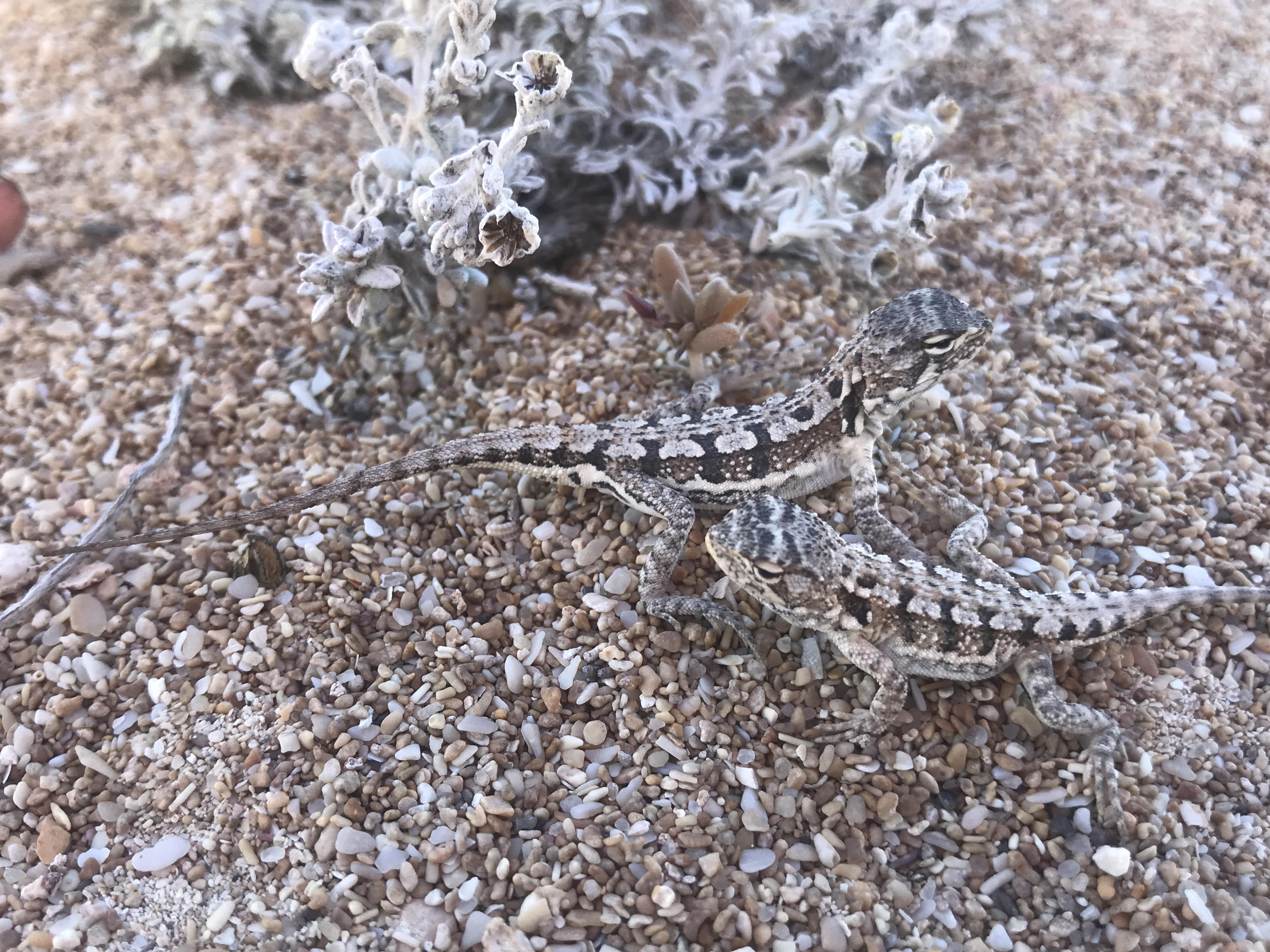

Conservation status
- Least Concern (IUCN 3.1)

Scientific classification
- Kingdom: Animalia
- Phylum: Chordata
- Class: Reptilia
- Order: Squamata
- Suborder: Iguania
- Family: Agamidae
- Genus: Ctenophorus
- Species: C. butlerorum

Binomial name
- Ctenophorus butlerorum (Storr, 1977)
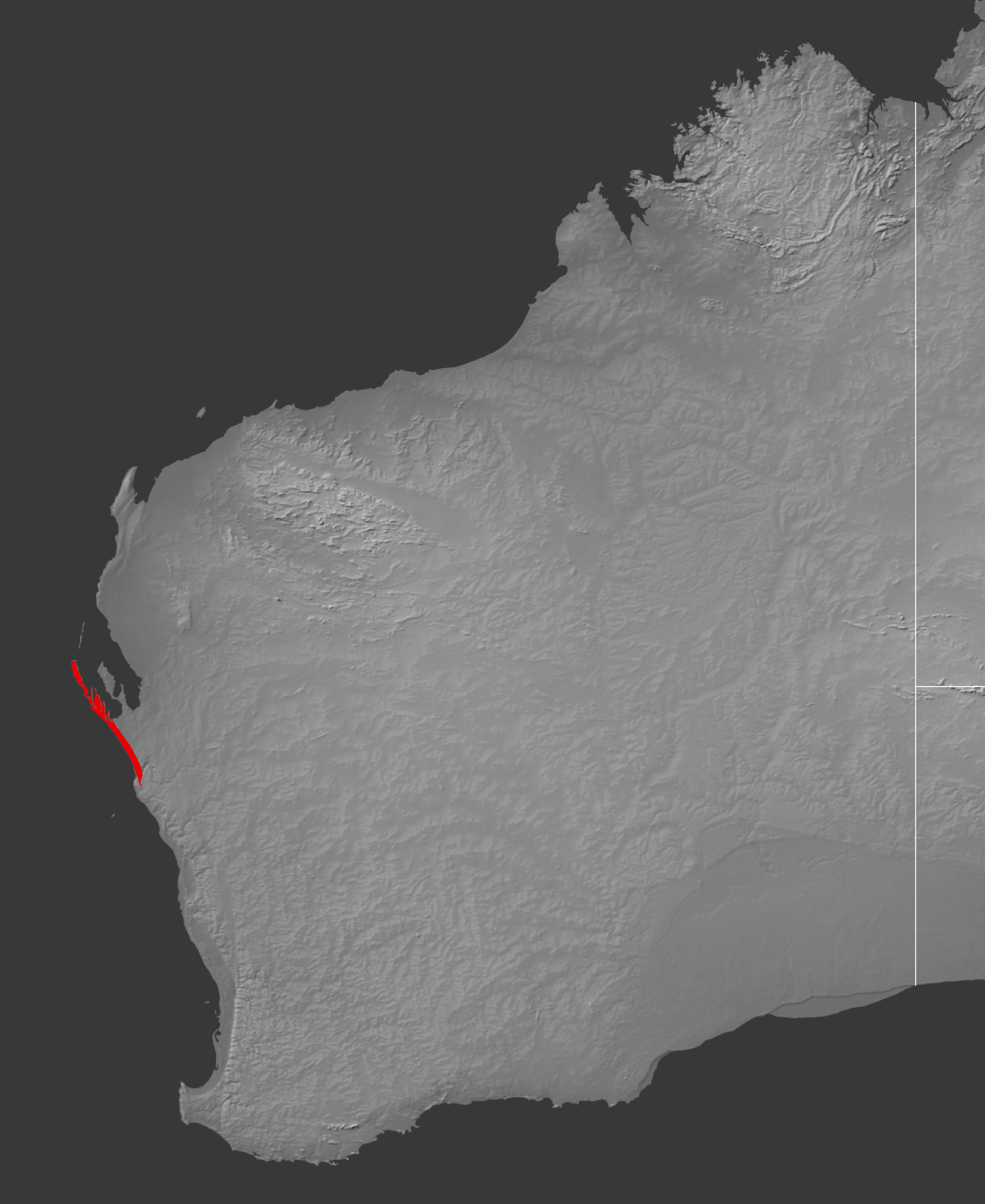
- Distribution of Ctenophorus butlerorum

Synonyms
- Amphibolurus parviceps butleri Storr, 1977; Tympanocryptis parviceps butleri — Cogger, 2000; Tympanocryptis butleri — Greer, 2006; Rankina butleri — Melville, Shoo & Doughty, 2008; Ctenophorus butleri — Wilson & Swan, 2010; Ctenophorus butlerorum — Title, 2018; Ctenophorus butlerorum — Ellis, 2019

= Ctenophorus butlerorum =

Species of lizard

Ctenophorus butlerorum, also known commonly as Butler's dragon, the Shark Bay heath dragon and the Edel heath dragon, is a species of lizard in the family Agamidae. The species is endemic to Australia.

== Etymology ==
The specific name, butlerorum (Latin, genitive plural), is in honor of Australian naturalist William Henry "Harry" Butler and his wife Margaret Butler.

== Habitat and geographic range ==
C. butlerorum is found in dunes and sandplains of the mid-west coast of Western Australia between Shark Bay and Kalbarri.

== Reproduction ==
The mode of reproduction of C. butlerorum is unknown.
