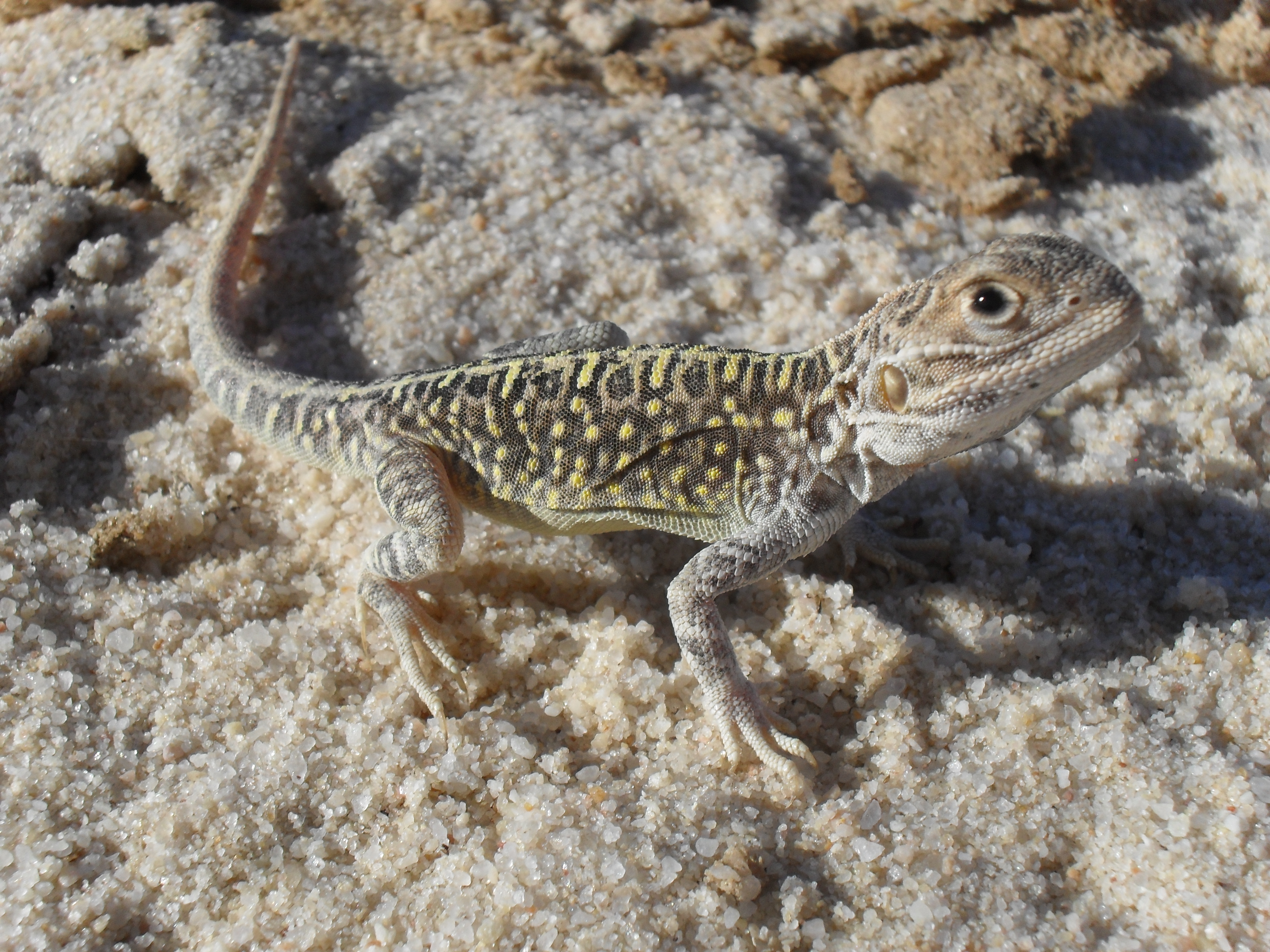

Conservation status
- Least Concern (IUCN 3.1)

Scientific classification
- Kingdom: Animalia
- Phylum: Chordata
- Class: Reptilia
- Order: Squamata
- Suborder: Iguania
- Family: Agamidae
- Genus: Ctenophorus
- Species: C. salinarum

Binomial name
- Ctenophorus salinarum (Storr, 1966)

Synonyms
- Amphibolurus pictus salinarum (Storr, 1966); Amphibolurus salinarum (Cogger, 1983); Ctenophorus salinarum (Storr, 1966)

= Ctenophorus salinarum =

Species of lizard

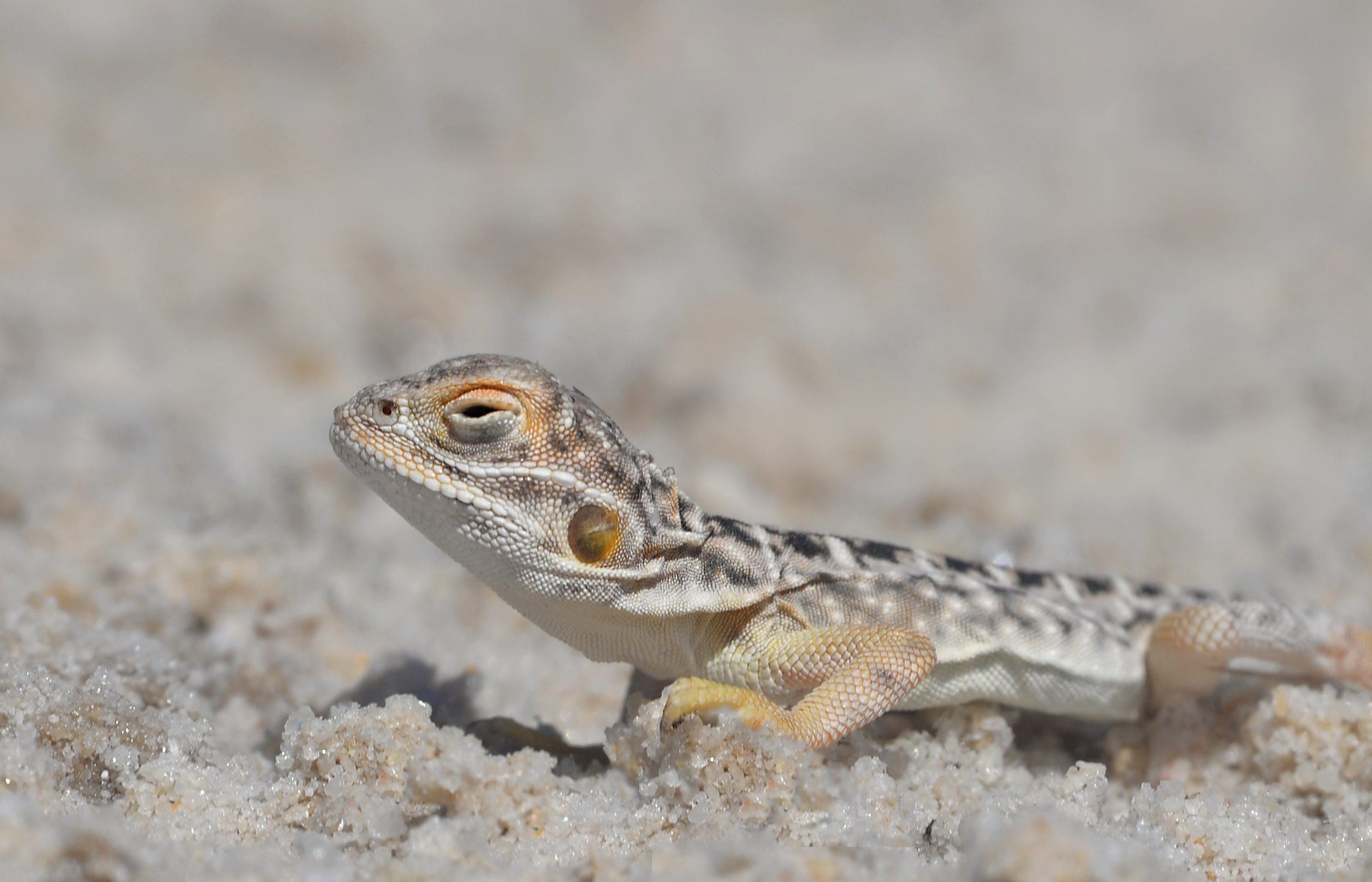
Claypan dragon'

Ctenophorus salinarum, commonly known as the claypan dragon or saltpan ground-dragon is a species of agamid lizard occurring in arid to semi-arid chenopod shrublands around salt lakes and claypans and in adjacent sandy heaths in southern Western Australia.
