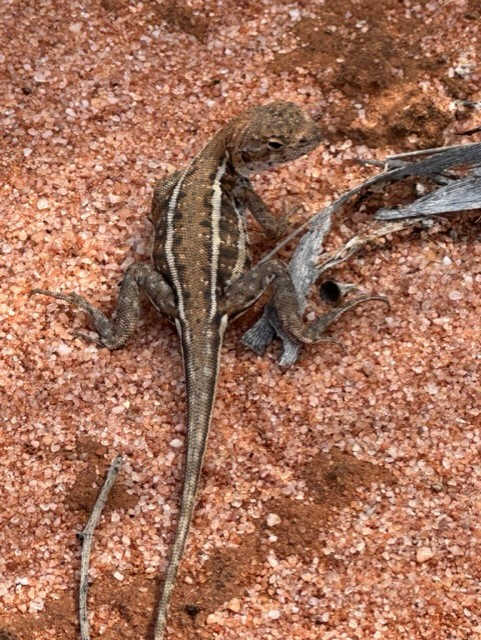

Scientific classification
- Kingdom: Animalia
- Phylum: Chordata
- Class: Reptilia
- Order: Squamata
- Suborder: Iguania
- Family: Agamidae
- Genus: Ctenophorus
- Species: C. spinodomus

Binomial name
- Ctenophorus spinodomus Sadlier, Colgan, Beatson, & Cogger, 2019
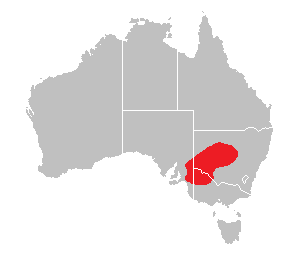
- Distribution of Ctenophorus spinodomus

= Eastern Mallee dragon =

Species of lizard

The eastern Mallee dragon (Ctenophorus spinodomus) is a species of agamid lizard endemic to the arid and semi-arid regions of southeastern Australia. Belonging to the genus Ctenophorus, which comprises a diverse group of 35 species this small lizard is characterised by striking colours and unique behaviours. Commonly known as dragon lizards, spinodomus is derived from the Greek words "spinos" (thorn) and "domos" (house), referring to its preference for burrowing habitats among spiny vegetation. They are curious creatures and can be found darting between the safety of Triodia grass clumps or basking on the red sand.

== Description ==
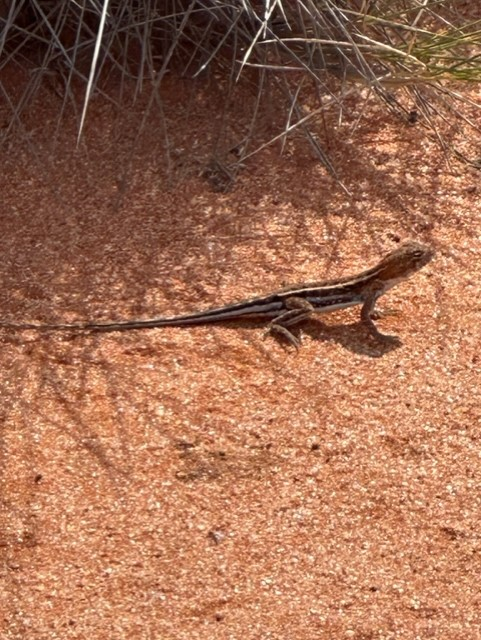
Eastern Mallee Dragon

The Eastern Mallee dragon exhibits a range of physical features that distinguish it from other agamid lizards and which play a crucial role in their survival.

Adult males have a continuous row of 15–22 femoral pores on each side, arranged in an arching pattern toward the midline and have a pale brown to medium sandy orange dorsal surface with a pale dorsolateral stripe bordered by dark edges. They also feature dark blotches on the dorsal surface, while the upper-lateral surface displays large dark markings. The mid-lateral surface exhibits a pale stripe, sometimes with scattered flecks. The tail has pale spots along the dorsolateral edge and the side of the tail is dark, forming a distinct stripe bordered by a pale stripe for the basal third. The ventral surface is pale with dark scattered speckling on the throat and a dark chest patch broken by white flecks which may align along the midline forming a poorly defined T-shape.

Adult females have a similar pattern but with lighter tones, and the ventral surface lacks significant dark markings. They can also be identified by the presence of a fine, typically uninterrupted pale dorsolateral stripe extending from the neck to just past the hind limbs.

Eastern Mallee dragons are relatively small typically growing to around 15.5–18 cm in total length with adult females being generally larger than males in body size. Adult males have longer tails and hind limbs than females with tail length approximately 2.1–2.4 times the body length in males and 1.95–2.15 times in females.

== Taxonomy ==
Recent taxonomic revisions in the classification of Australia's agamid lizards have led to the discovery of numerous new species with considerable ecological and morphological diversity. Researchers have studied the relationships between these species and found there are several subgroups that share a common ancestor with species delimitation methods, supporting their differentiation.

Previous populations of the Mallee military dragon (Ctenophorus fordi) found within the Triodia Mallee habitat of inland southeast Australia showed significant differences in their physical features to other populations of the species, having evolved separately due to their geographical isolation, and were reclassified in 2019 as the eastern Mallee dragon (Ctenophorus spinodomus).

== Distribution and habitat ==
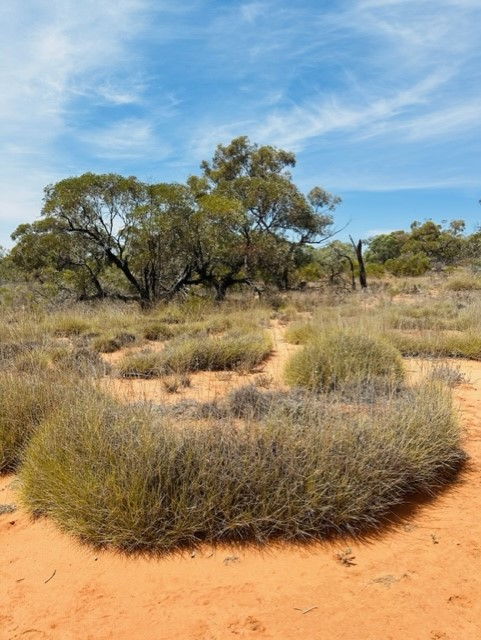
Spinifex hummocks (Triodia)

The Eastern Mallee dragon is endemic to the eastern Mallee region of Australia, encompassing the red sand-plains and Mallee woodlands of south central and south western New South Wales and along the northern side of the Murray River into South Australia. They are well adapted to the arid and semi-arid landscapes of this region with its range highly restricted to the presence of Spinifex hummock grass (Triodia) for foraging, shelter and social interactions. Spinifex occurs as a groundcover associated with Mallee woodlands in what is known as Triodia Mallee vegetation, with eastern Mallee dragons also requiring this habitat to be in combination with a red sand substrate to provide nesting and overwintering sites.

== Ecology ==
Eastern Mallee dragons are diurnal, terrestrial agamid lizards which follow a primarily annual life cycle, though some individuals may extend into a second, and rarely a third, season. A significant increase in adult mortality begins in late December and continues into January, resulting in the loss of as much as 85% of the population during this period.

Males tend to have larger home ranges, averaging around 0.032 hectares, while females exhibit smaller home ranges, with an average of about 0.015 hectares. Juveniles have even smaller ranges, approximately 0.007 hectares, compared to adults. Notably, there is minimal shift in home range size, migration is negligible and territorial behaviour has not been observed among these lizards.

The species is more common in landscapes featuring extensive Triodia Mallee vegetation and their presence is particularly associated with a substantial coverage of Spinifex and the presence of healthy, large hummocks, which typically occurs around 20–50 years post-fire, with a peak around 35 years. After this peak period, population densities gradually decline. They follow a diel (24 hourly) cycle based on the utilisation of Spinifex clumps at different times of the day. Like many reptiles, eastern Mallee dragons are ectothermic and rely on external heat sources to regulate their body temperature. They are often seen basking in the sun, especially in the morning and late afternoon. During the night, individuals seek shelter within the Spinifex and bask among the spines of the clump to attain a suitable body temperature for activity. Upon emergence, they tend to remain within a few meters and during the hottest part of the day, retreat within the nearest Spinifex clumps, where humidity levels are higher than the ambient environment, and the temperature is notably lower than the surroundings, especially compared to the substrate. During the winter period, few individuals remain inactive within the Spinifex and instead observations suggest that they dig into the soil and seek shelter underground.

== Reproduction ==
Eastern Mallee dragons are oviparous, meaning they lay eggs. The breeding season typically occurs in the warmer months of the year, with egg-laying often taking place in late spring or early summer, and the highest egg deposition rates typically around mid-November. Males compete by engaging in combat displays including head-bobbing and tail-waving, to establish dominance and attract females. Females usually lay clutches of 2-3 eggs, burying them in a well-prepared underground nest chamber which is constructed and sealed on the same day as laying. Incubation takes place in the warm, protected environment of the nest, with hatching occurring in under 8 weeks. Hatchlings are relatively independent from birth and must fend for themselves, with an average of only 20% of hatchlings reaching reproductive maturity.

== Diet ==
Eastern Mallee dragons feed almost exclusively on ants, foraging in open areas adjacent to Spinifex and are also known to be opportunistic feeders consuming other insects.

== Threats ==
As a habitat specialist the eastern Mallee dragon is highly susceptible to habitat loss and increased predation as Triodia Mallee vegetation is fragmented due to agricultural land clearing and natural processes such as fire. These lizards are rarely detected in remnant patches however occur in high abundance in reserve areas. Eastern Mallee dragons rely on successional stages of development of Spinifex hummocks post fire and one outcome of extensive wildfires is the formation of a widespread, uniform age group of regenerating Triodia Mallee. In cases where entire fragments are completely burned and there is no internal population for recolonisation, there is potential for the local extinction of the eastern Mallee dragon.
