= Ctenophorus femoralis =

Conservation status
- Least Concern (IUCN 3.1)

Scientific classification
- Kingdom: Animalia
- Phylum: Chordata
- Class: Reptilia
- Order: Squamata
- Suborder: Iguania
- Family: Agamidae
- Genus: Ctenophorus
- Species: C. femoralis

Binomial name
- Ctenophorus femoralis (Storr, 1965)

Synonyms
- Amphibolurus femoralis (Storr, 1965); Phthanodon femoralis (Storr, 1965)

Species of lizard

Ctenophorus femoralis, the long-tailed sand dragon, is a species of agamid lizard occurring on spinifex covered sand-ridges and sand-plains on the arid mid-western coast of Western Australia.
