= Ctenophorus rufescens =

Rusty Dragon

Conservation status
- Least Concern (IUCN 3.1)
- CITES Appendix III (CITES)

Scientific classification
- Kingdom: Animalia
- Phylum: Chordata
- Class: Reptilia
- Order: Squamata
- Suborder: Iguania
- Family: Agamidae
- Genus: Ctenophorus
- Species: C. rufescens

Binomial name
- Ctenophorus rufescens (Stirling & Zietz, 1893)

Synonyms
- Amphibolurus rufescens (Stirling & Zietz, 1893)

Species of lizard

Ctenophorus rufescens, commonly known as the rusty dragon or rusty-crevice dragon is a species of agamid lizard occurring in granite outcrops featuring open expanses strewn with exfoliated rock, in arid north-western South Australia, south-western Northern Territory and adjacent Western Australia.
