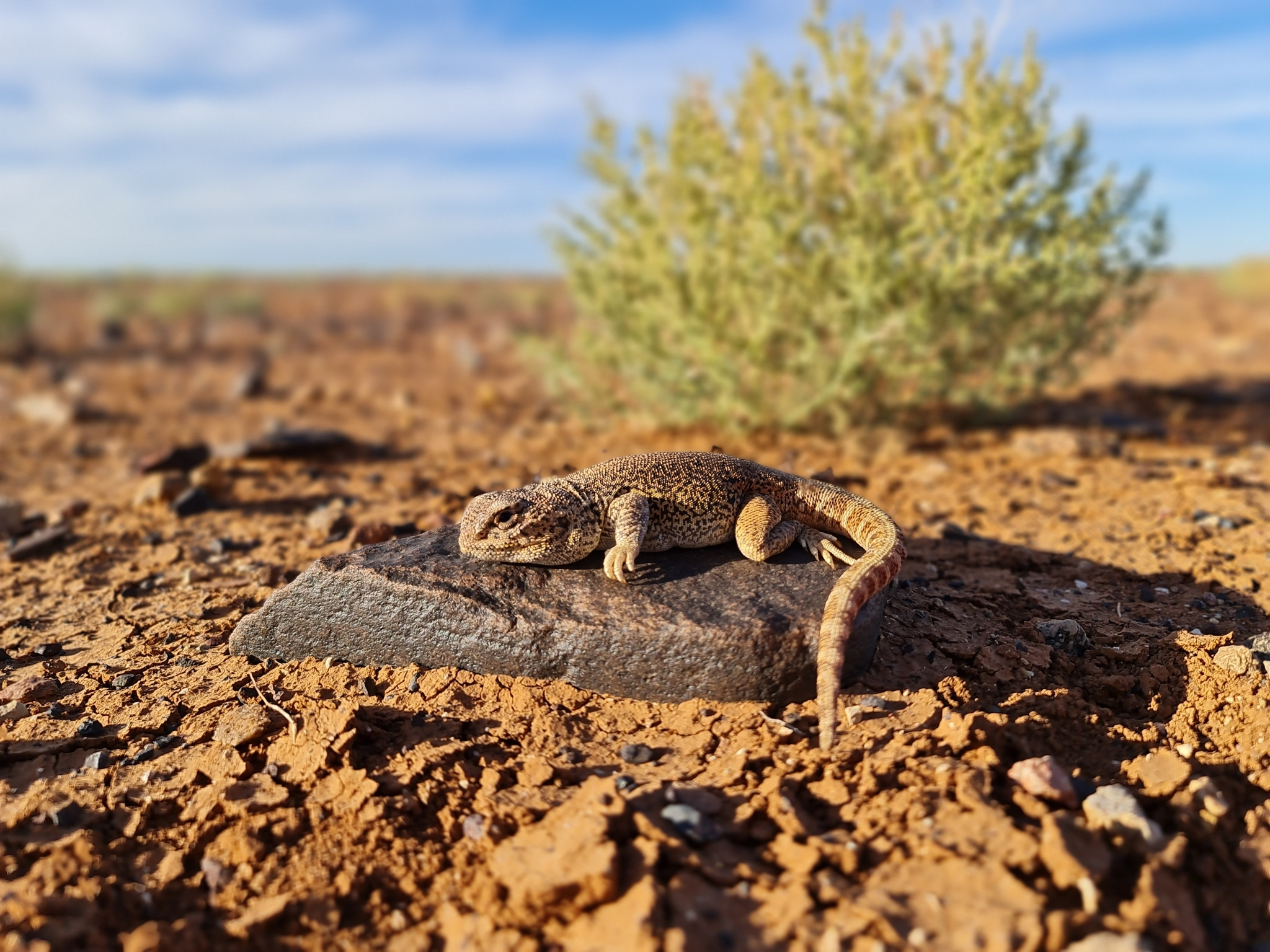
- Bulldust Ground-dragon on a rock

Conservation status
- Least Concern (IUCN 3.1)

Scientific classification
- Kingdom: Animalia
- Phylum: Chordata
- Class: Reptilia
- Order: Squamata
- Suborder: Iguania
- Family: Agamidae
- Genus: Ctenophorus
- Species: C. gibba

Binomial name
- Ctenophorus gibba (Houston, 1974)

Synonyms
- Amphibolurus gibba (Houston, 1974)

= Ctenophorus gibba =

Species of lizard

Ctenophorus gibba, commonly known as the bulldust ground-dragon or gibber dragon, is a species of agamid lizard (Agamidae family) occurring in the sparsely vegetated gibber plains of northern South Australia.

== Description ==
Ctenophorus gibba is a medium-sized lizard with a robust body and a tail longer than its body. The species displays sexual dimorphism, with males being larger and more brightly colored than females. Typical coloration includes shades of brown and gray, with patterns that help it blend into its arid surroundings. Adult Gibber dragons range in colour from yellowish-brown to reddish-brown to grey, with dark flecks. They are stout, with a round head, blunt snout, short limbs and tail. Adults have a total length (including tail) of 10.5–11.5 cm (4.1–4.5 in).

== Habitat ==
Ctenophorus gibba is typically found in arid and semi-arid regions of central Australia. It prefers rocky outcrops and gibber plains, which provide ample basking sites and shelter from predators.

== Ecology and behaviour ==
This species is diurnal and primarily insectivorous, feeding on a variety of insects and other small invertebrates. Ctenophorus gibba is known for its territorial behavior, with males establishing and defending territories during the breeding season. The Gibber dragon lives in the arid, sparsely vegetated gibber plains of northern South Australia. They bask on low protruding rocks and shelter in burrows dug into the soft soil between rocks.

== Reproduction ==
Ctenophorus gibba breeds in the spring and summer months. Females lay clutches of 2-6 eggs, which are buried in sandy soil. The eggs hatch after an incubation period of approximately 60-70 days, depending on environmental conditions.

== Conservation status ==
Currently, Ctenophorus gibba is not considered endangered. However, habitat destruction and climate change pose potential threats to its populations. Conservation efforts focus on habitat preservation and monitoring population trends.
