= Ctenophorus scutulatus =

Lozenge-marked Dragon

Conservation status
- Least Concern (IUCN 3.1)

Scientific classification
- Kingdom: Animalia
- Phylum: Chordata
- Class: Reptilia
- Order: Squamata
- Suborder: Iguania
- Family: Agamidae
- Genus: Ctenophorus
- Species: C. scutulatus

Binomial name
- Ctenophorus scutulatus (Stirling & Zietz, 1893)

Synonyms
- Amphibolurus scutulatus (Stirling & Zietz, 1893); Licentia scutulata (Stirling & Zietz, 1893); Amphibolurus websteri (Boulenger, 1904); Amphibolurus holsti (Rosén, 1905)

Species of lizard

Ctenophorus scutulatus, commonly known as the lozenge-marked dragon or lozenge-marked bicycle-dragon is a species of agamid lizard occurring in semi-arid to arid zones on hard to stony soils supporting acacia woodlands and chenopod shrublands in Western Australia.
