= Ctenophorus infans =

Conservation status
- Least Concern (IUCN 3.1)

Scientific classification
- Kingdom: Animalia
- Phylum: Chordata
- Class: Reptilia
- Order: Squamata
- Suborder: Iguania
- Family: Agamidae
- Genus: Ctenophorus
- Species: C. infans

Binomial name
- Ctenophorus infans (Storr, 1967)

Synonyms
- Amphibolurus caudicinctus infans (Storr, 1967); Tachyon infans Wells & Wellington, 1985

Species of lizard

Ctenophorus infans, the Laverton ring-tailed dragon, is a species of agamid lizard occurring around Laverton and the Mount Margaret Goldfield of Western Australia.

It was formerly considered to be a subspecies of Ctenophorus caudicinctus.
