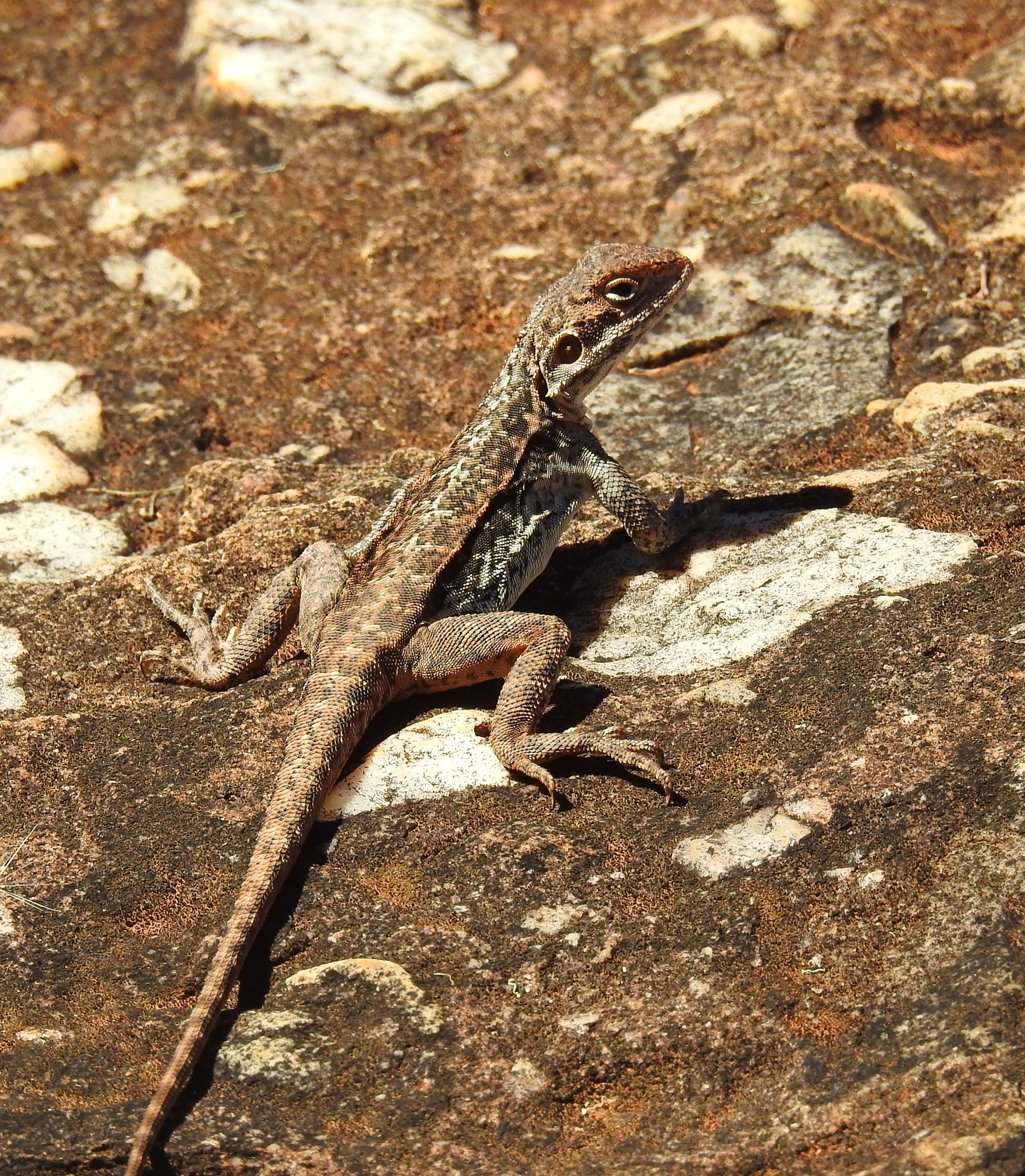

Conservation status
- Near Threatened (IUCN 3.1)

Scientific classification
- Kingdom: Animalia
- Phylum: Chordata
- Class: Reptilia
- Order: Squamata
- Suborder: Iguania
- Family: Agamidae
- Genus: Ctenophorus
- Species: C. mirrityana

Binomial name
- Ctenophorus mirrityana McLean, Moussalli, Sass, and Stuart-Fox, 2013

= Ctenophorus mirrityana =

Species of lizard

The Barrier Range dragon (Ctenophorus mirrityana) is an agamid lizard which has been newly described (2013) as a separate species from the tawny dragon (Ctenophorus decresii). This species is endemic to Australia, restricted to just three sites in western New South Wales (NSW).

== Taxonomy ==
C. mirrityana is the newest member of the Ctenophorus decresii complex, which originally comprised four closely related, rock-dwelling species. As a member of the Agamidae lizard family, this dragon is characterised by its well-developed limbs and rough scales. Currently made up of 33 species, Ctenophorus is the largest genus of agamid lizards in Australia, with most of these lizards found in arid areas. Assessment of its genetic, colour and anatomical differences to C. decresii, has led to the Barrier Range dragon being recognised as its own species.

== Description ==
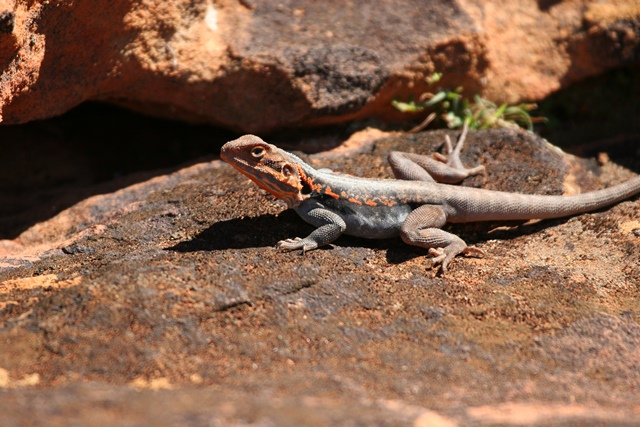
Adult Male Barrier Range Dragon

The Barrier Range dragon is a medium sized terrestrial lizard, which can reach a total length of 26 cm. Both males and females have small head and snout length measurements compared to other Ctenophorus species. Their compressed head and dorsoventrally flattened body, likely an adaptation for navigating the narrow rock crevices these lizards inhabit.

As a sexually dimorphic species, male Barrier Range dragons are brightly coloured in contrast to the cryptically coloured females. The body of the male ranges from grey-blue to pale blue, however as the lizard’s temperature increases, this blue becomes more prominent. In contrast to the body’s pale colouration, the head is orange with a black stripe beginning at the eye and continuing laterally along the flank. The cream base colour of the male’s throat features grey parallel stripes, overlain with orange colouration, and a central black stripe running the length of the throat. The unique colouration of the male’s throat is one feature that distinguishes this species from C. decresii.

Female Barrier Range dragons are brown in colour with black and terracotta stripes running along the flank. The dorsal scales also feature grey and terracotta specks. Similar to males, female lizards also have cream coloured throats with grey stripes but lack any black or orange colouration on the head. Juveniles have a similar appearance to the adult females, however they are generally paler with less vibrant speckling.

== Distribution and habitat ==
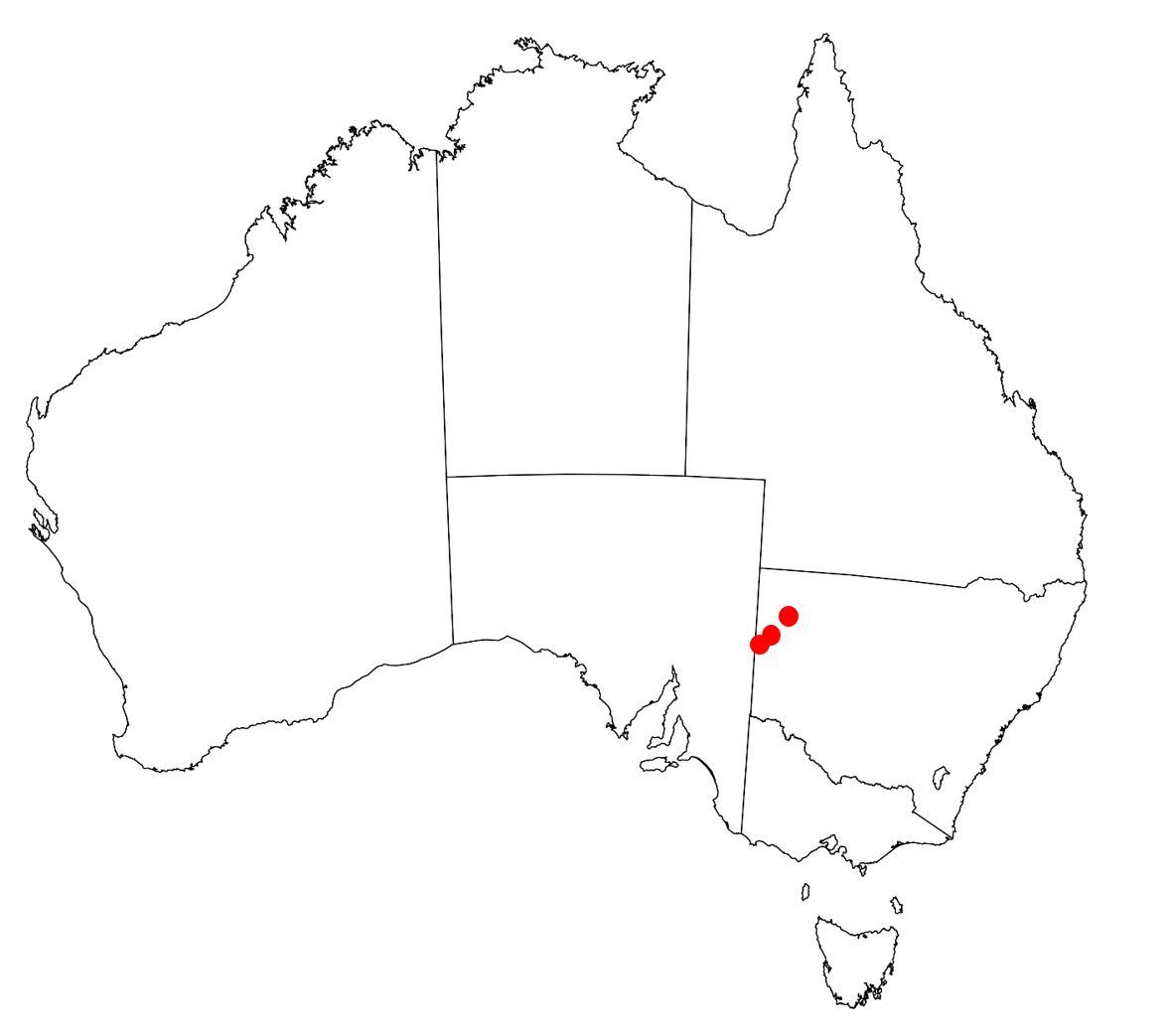
Distribution of the Barrier Range Dragon

The Barrier Range Dragon is found in the rocky hills of Western NSW at just three locations, including Mutawintji National Park, Purnamoota and Silverton Wind Farm. Typically, this species occurs in rocky habitat such as outcrops, gorges, ridges and scattered rock aggregates. However, it has also been recorded in mulga shrubland, black oak woodland and hummock grass woodland habitat.

== Ecology ==
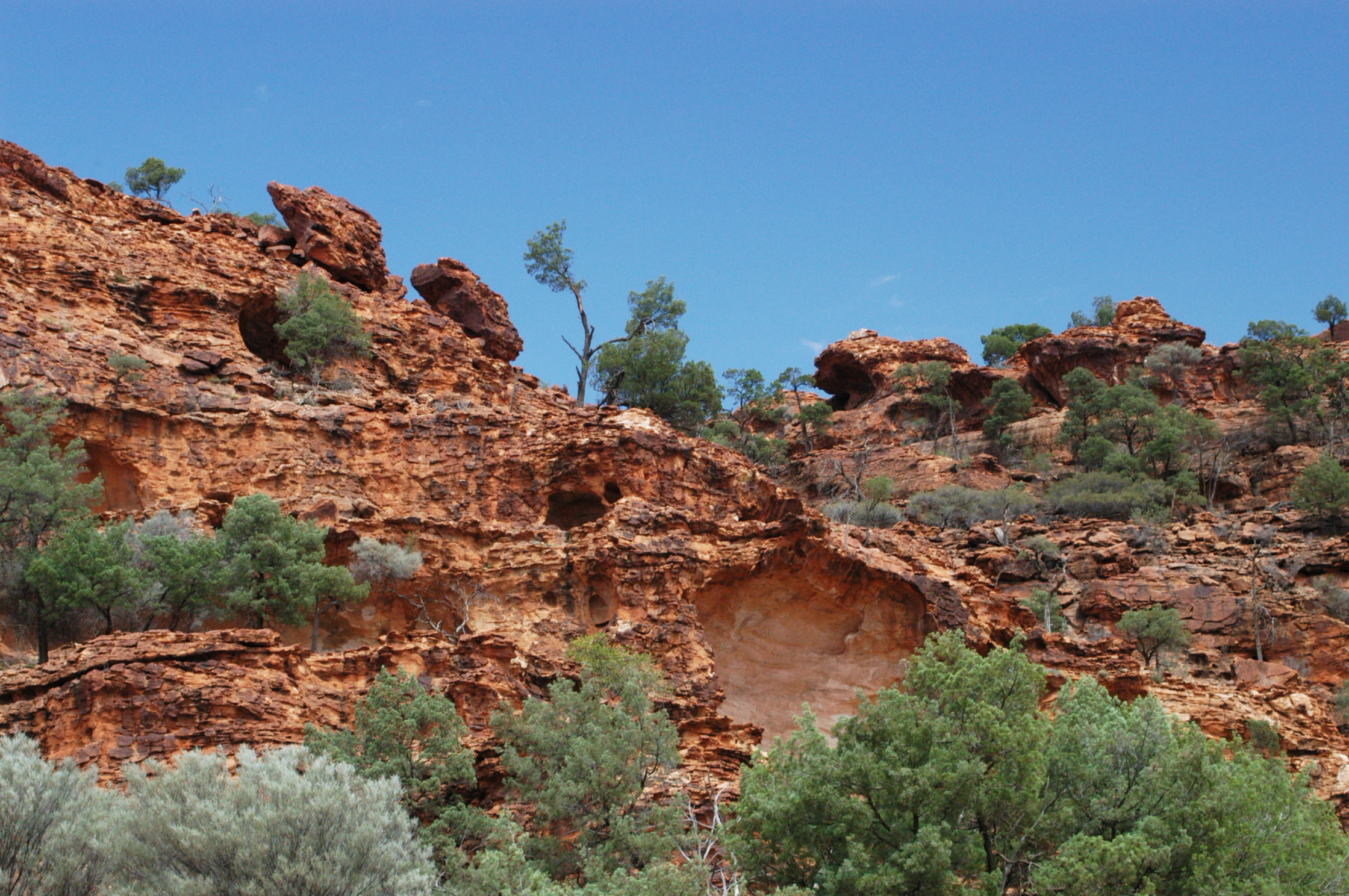
Rocky Outcrop at Mutawintji National Park

C. mirrityana is a rock dwelling, diurnal species that predominately occupies rock aggregates and the flat tops of ridges. As an ectotherm, these lizards utilise rocky habitat for basking but are inactive during the hottest part of the day (1300 and 1500 hrs).

As temperatures peak during the day, these dragons will seek out rock crevices, which are an important habitat requirement for this species. This species will also shelter in these structures when threatened. The dorsoventrally flattened head and body of the Barrier Range dragon further reflects how this species has evolved to rely on rock crevices.

These lizards also have long hindlimbs which assists them in navigating their rocky environment.

As male Barrier Range dragons are territorial and participate in conspicuous courtship behaviour, they utilise elevated rocky outcrops to demonstrate these displays.

== Evolutionary relationships ==
All members of the C. decresii are sexually dimorphic and well adapted to the rocky habitats they inhabit. Some common anatomical features include a dorsoventrally flattened head and long hindlimbs.

However, a number of morphological measurements distinguishes C. mirrityana from other species of the C. decresii complex. Measurements which separate this lizard from the other taxa include the small head relative to body size, snout length, jaw length and width between nostrils.

Although differences in throat colouration exist, male Barrier Range dragon dorsal colouration closely resemble C. decresii and C. fionni males from the Lower Eyre Peninsula population. This suggests that dorsal scale colouration and pattern is an ancestral trait.

It is likely that distinct differences in throat colouration between species in the C. decresii complex is due to the elaborate courtship behaviour. As the throat is on display during this behaviour, mate recognition and selection have likely led to colour divergence between the species.

== Life-history traits ==
The Barrier Range dragon is an oviparous, that is, egg laying species that breeds between late July and early November. During the breeding season, males will perform courtship and territorial behaviour, characterised by head bobbing and push-ups. Typically, this species will lay 3-7 eggs in a clutch and multiple clutches can be produced within a breeding season. Females will lay their eggs in constructed burrows that create a stable humid environment for the eggs. Under stable environmental conditions in the burrow eggs can hatch after 55 days; however, it can take up to 89 days for eggs to hatch.

During the breeding season both males and females develop orange colouration on the belly.

== Conservation ==
Although currently listed as endangered in NSW, more extensive field surveys are required in order to accurately assess this species conservation status. Due to its restricted distribution, the Barrier Range dragon faces a number of threats including habitat degradation, competition for resources, fire, predation by feral predators and inappropriate land management.

As rock crevices and the structure of outcrops are significant habitat considerations for C. mirrityana, competition for habitat and degradation by goats (Capra hircus) is arguably the biggest threat to this species. By exerting a grazing pressure on flora, feral goats have a negative impact on vegetation diversity, cover and structure in the Barrier Range dragon’s habitat. This has the potential to reduce or alter the availability of key prey species for these lizards. Feral goats also have a detrimental effect on habitat quality, as C. mirrityana is less likely to inhabit rock crevices which are filled or partially filled with goat scat. Frequent fires are another threatening process which could also potentially reduce the availably of suitable habitat and food sources for the Barrier Range dragon.

Predation by introduced species, including feral cats and foxes, is a significant threat to the species.

As an endangered species, the Barrier Range dragon is part of the NSW Saving Our Species initiative. In order to increase the species numbers and manage threats against this dragon, two priority sites are being utilised for conservation projects and management activities. These sites include Mutawintji National Park and Purnamoota.
