= Ctenophorus maculosus =

Conservation status
- Least Concern (IUCN 3.1)

Scientific classification
- Kingdom: Animalia
- Phylum: Chordata
- Class: Reptilia
- Order: Squamata
- Suborder: Iguania
- Family: Agamidae
- Genus: Ctenophorus
- Species: C. maculosus

Binomial name
- Ctenophorus maculosus (Mitchell, 1948)
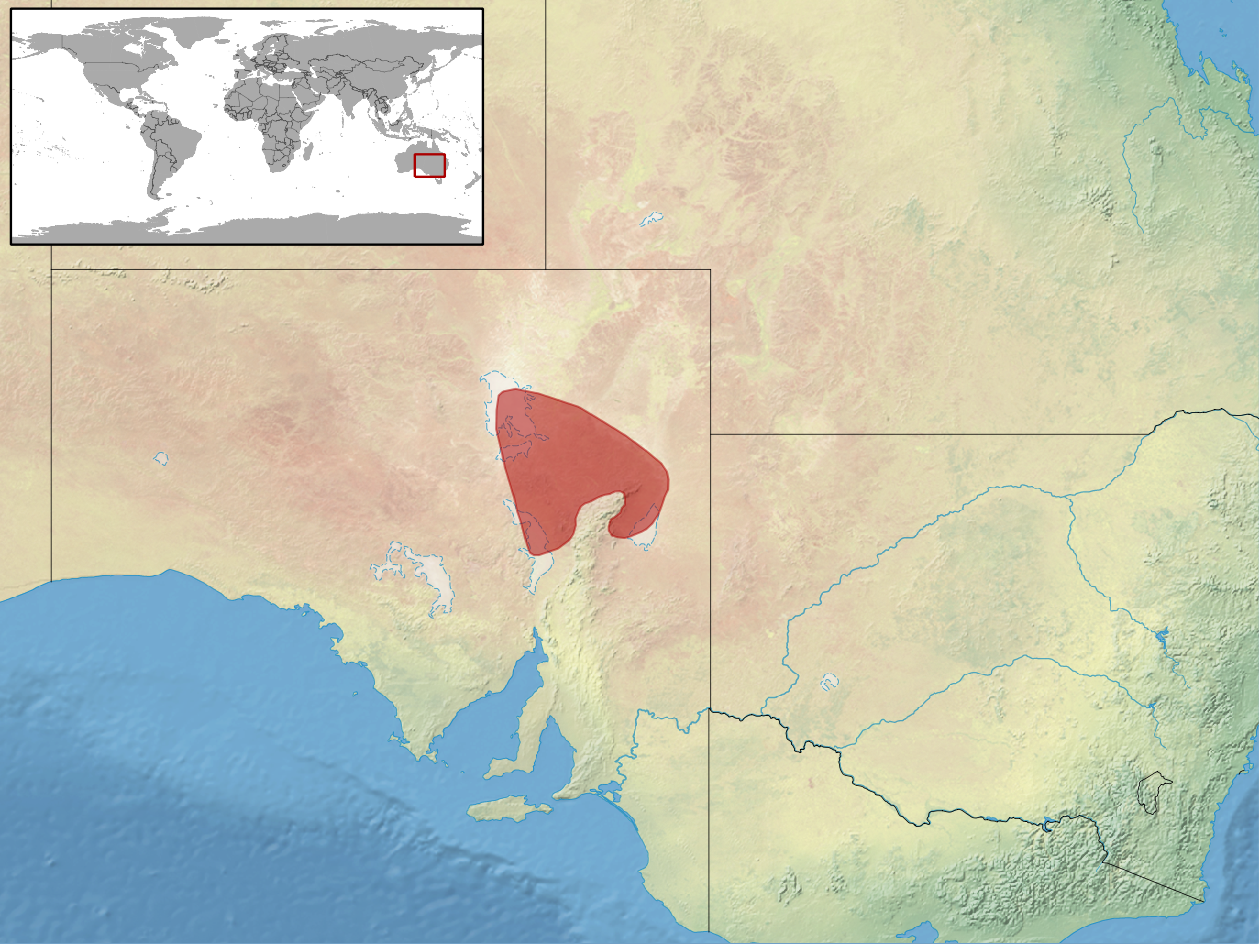

Synonyms
- Tympanocryptis maculosa F.J. Mitchell, 1948; Amphibolurus maculosus — Cogger, 1983; Ctenophorus maculosus — Cogger, 2000

Species of lizard

Ctenophorus maculosus, commonly known as the Lake Eyre dragon or salt-lake ground-dragon, is a species of agamid lizard endemic to South Australia. C. maculosus mainly inhabits the edges of salt lakes in South Australia, from which its common names are derived. It survives in this harsh habitat through adaptive mechanisms to tolerate high temperatures and lack of free water. The female C. maculosus possesses unique male rejection techniques which are currently the focus of further research.

== Description ==
C. maculosus can be identified by a white to pale grey dorsal surface with black blotches and a white ventral surface with a dark longitudinal dark streak. Black and brown spots are observed throughout its body. This cryptic coloration allows the species to blend into the salt surface it inhabits, and color variations are found depending on the specific population's environment. The adult male is about 11.5 cm (4.5 in) long (including tail), and the adult female is slightly shorter at 10.0 cm (3.9 in). C. maculosus possesses small, sunken eyes protected by serrated eyelids and eye linings. Its nostrils are connected to its nasal cavity by only a narrow downward slit. This nasal structure is adaptive for preventing nasal blockage from burrowing in sand. Other sand-burrowing American lizards have also developed similar nasal structures via convergent evolution, including species in the genera Uracentron, Holbrookia, and Phrynosoma.

== Distribution and habitat ==
C. maculosus is endemic to the three largest dry salt lakes of inner South Australia (Lake Eyre, Lake Callabonna, and Lake Torrens), with the densest population found in Lake Eyre. Three habitat characteristics characterize its distribution: a surface crust, a thick layer of dry sand or clay under the crust, and a constant source of humidity. This dragon lizard inhabits the edges of the lakes where it burrows in the damp sediments under the salt crust.

== Diet ==
The main food source for C. maculosus is the harvest ant Melophorus. The nest-mounds of these ants provide an additional benefit to the dragon lizard as lookout points, basking sites, and sources of shade. C. maculosus is an opportunistic feeder, also feeding on other insects trapped on the salt surface.

== Behavior ==
=== Adaptations ===
C. maculosus has developed behavioral mechanisms of avoiding environmental stresses in a similar fashion to desert-adapted animals. It uses various postures and movements to maintain an optimal body temperature. Its physiology has also adapted to the lack of free water by having a low evaporation rate, thus reducing water loss from the body.

=== Flooding response ===
When C. maculosus is forced to the beach surface by flooding, it changes color to a deeper grey with more numerous black and brown spots to match the pebbly beach sands. It also appears to show greater muscle coordination and the body inflates, which helps the dragon lizard float on the surface of the water.

=== Sexual behavior ===
The male C. maculosus is highly aggressive and attempts to force copulation with females by repeated harassment. Male harassment behavior can include chasing, biting, and pinning the female to the ground. On occasion, the male may injure or kill the female with which he is attempting to copulate by his mating grasp. The female employs three main rejection strategies to protect herself: fleeing from the male, performing a threat display, or flipping over on her back to prevent copulation. This last behavior is unique to C. maculosus and one species of insect. The female develops a bright orange color on her throat when she is reproductively receptive. In threat display and flipping-over rejection, the female reveals her throat to communicate rejection to the male. Oviposition results in significant declines in steroid levels, a fading of color from the throat, and an increase in rejection behavior.
