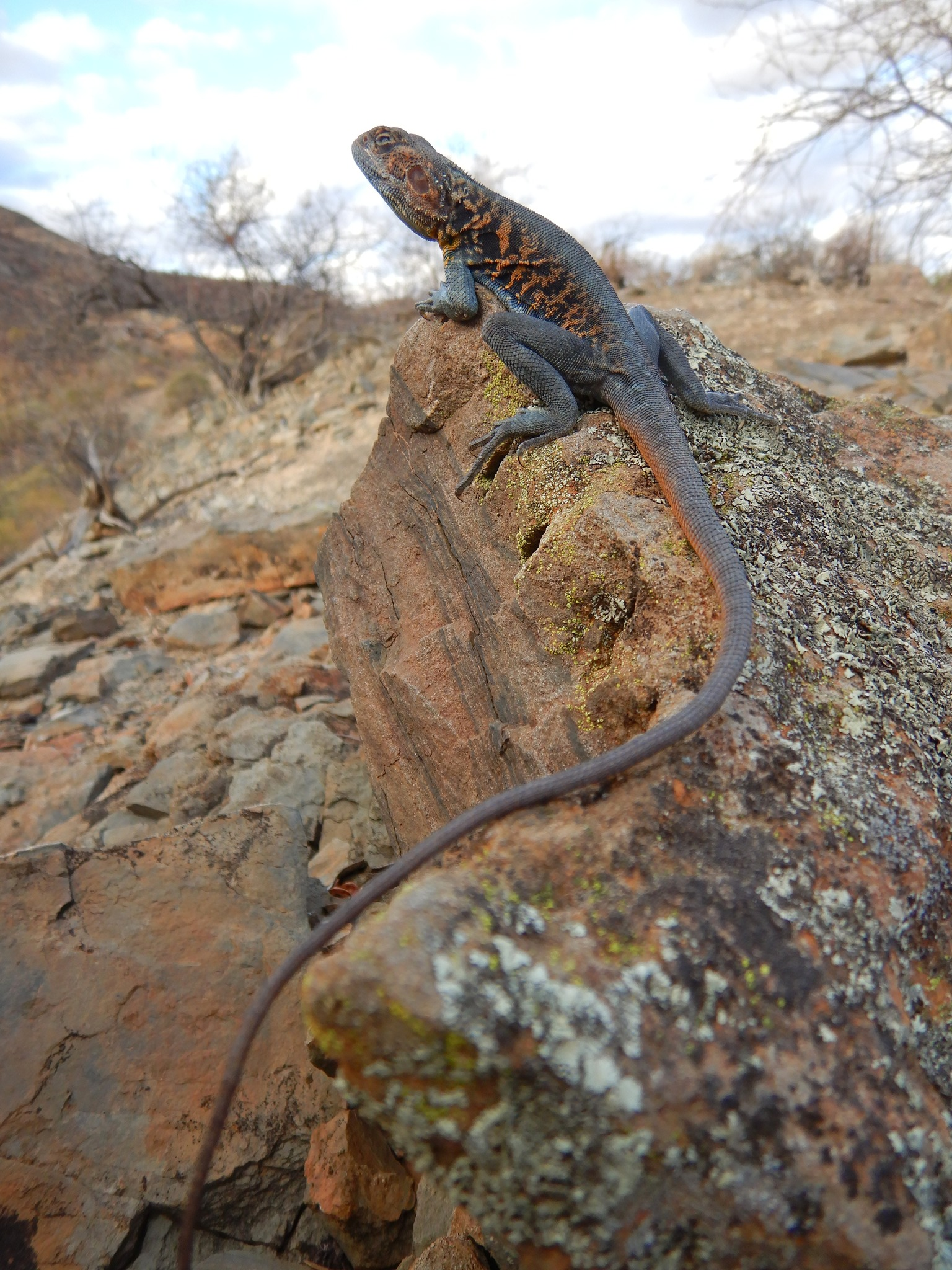
- In Flinders Ranges, South Australia, Australia

Conservation status
- Least Concern (IUCN 3.1)

Scientific classification
- Kingdom: Animalia
- Phylum: Chordata
- Class: Reptilia
- Order: Squamata
- Suborder: Iguania
- Family: Agamidae
- Genus: Ctenophorus
- Species: C. vadnappa

Binomial name
- Ctenophorus vadnappa (Houston, 1974)

Synonyms
- Amphibolurus vadnappa (Houston, 1974)

= Ctenophorus vadnappa =

Red-barred dragon

Species of lizard

Ctenophorus vadnappa, commonly known as the red-barred dragon or red-barred crevice-dragon is a species of agamid lizard occurring in rocky outcrops and ranges in semi-arid to arid South Australia, from the northern Flinders Ranges to hills north of Lake Torrens.
