= Ctenophorus parviceps =

Gnaraloo heath dragon

Conservation status
- Least Concern (IUCN 3.1)

Scientific classification
- Kingdom: Animalia
- Phylum: Chordata
- Class: Reptilia
- Order: Squamata
- Suborder: Iguania
- Family: Agamidae
- Genus: Ctenophorus
- Species: C. parviceps

Binomial name
- Ctenophorus parviceps (Storr, 1964)

Synonyms
- Amphibolurus parviceps parviceps (Storr, 1964); Rankinia parviceps (Storr, 1964); Tympanocryptis parviceps (Storr, 1964)

Species of lizard

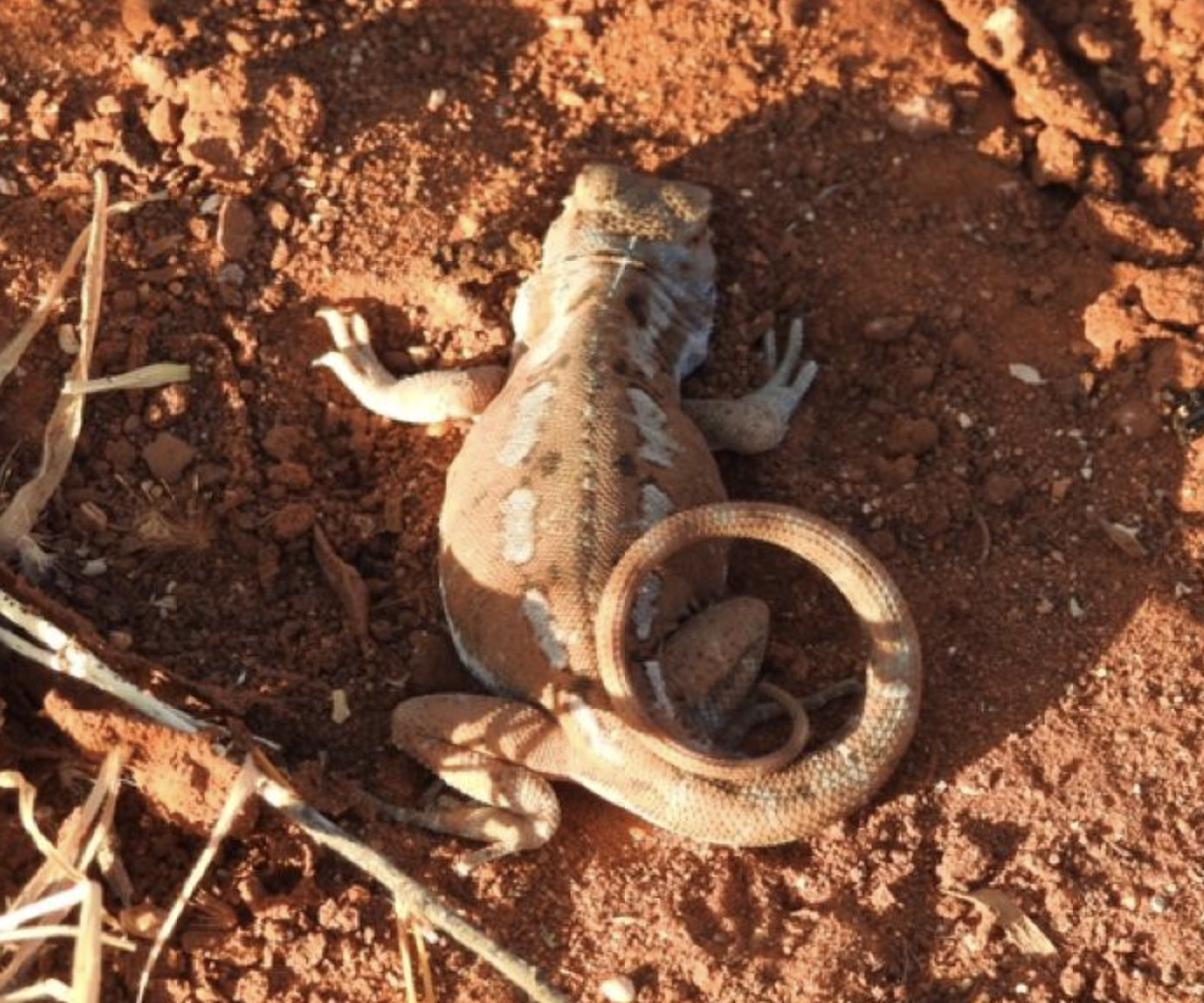
Ctenophorus parviceps

Ctenophorus parviceps, commonly known as the Gnaraloo heath dragon or northwestern heath dragon is a species of agamid lizard occurring in pale coastal sands and shell grit with open heaths and beach spinifex, between the North West Cape and Carnarvon, Western Australia and on Bernier Island. The Gnaraloo heath dragon (Ctenophorus parviceps) is a lizard that can be found along the coast of Western Australia between Exmouth Gulf and Shark Bay, and is also known as the northwestern heath dragon. It is native to Australia and usually inhabits sandy coastal dunes. The species' longevity is 3–50 years and its population density is extremely low. The Gnaraloo heath dragon is a member of the Agamidae family, which contains 15 genera. The lizard is under the Ctenophorus genus which has up to 33 species. This genus shows the most morphological and ecological diversity out of the three large agamid genera. 83% of the lizards in this genus lack a crest, while 17% possess crests. They are smaller than most agamids but do have relatively large heads. The Gnaraloo heath dragon can be differentiated from related species by a series of spines on the tail's base, a pale-grey brown broad vertebral band along its back, and hour-glass bars extending upwards to meet the pale vertebral band. It is usually 45mm in terms of length, measuring from snout to vent.

== Description ==
The Gnaraloo heath dragon is a relatively slender lizard with a small head and a neck narrower than its head. Its flanks and sides are darker brown and its scales are strongly keeled. The hindlimb is roughly 70% of the snout-vent length and the tail is about 150%. The body shape of this terrestrial lizard, like the rest of its taxa, is made for fast movement and foraging open areas.

The Gnaraloo heath dragon has a dark pattern and numerous pores, usually 24–36. Male and female lizards can be distinguished by the number of pores. Males have 8-10 pre-anal pores and females have 16-25 femoral pores. Within the Ctenophorus genus, each species' male and female lizards can also be distinguished by colour patterns. Intricate patterns are found more in males as these patterns correlate with selection for male sexual signals. Their colour also often varies with age, seasonal or temperate changes.

It is a terrestrial diurnal reptile and occupies hummock grassland, low open shrubland, tall shrubland and sandy coastal dunes. Most Ctenophorus lizards do not burrow to retreat, but instead retreat to rock crevices. The Gnaraloo heath dragon reproduces via oviparity. This process, egg-laying, is an inherited mode of reproduction for all vertebrates. Although its population density is exceptionally low, the longevity of the species is average and 15 species in the Ctenophorus genus are only believed to be imperiled rather than endangered. The Ctenophorus parviceps is not listed for conservation concern, but is threatened by habitat loss and degradation, climate change, death on roads, feral predators, cane toads, and emerging diseases.

== Distribution and habitat ==
The species of Gnaraloo heath dragon are mostly found in Southwestern Australia - along the coast between Exmouth Gulf and Shark Bay - within Canavron Bay. Western Australia's coastal areas are known for its biodiversity and as a fast growing urban and agricultural region. However, the distribution of the Ctenophorus parviceps in the North of Shark Bay has led to its geographical isolation. This species is geographically limited by the sandy region along the coast which runs up until the Northwest Cape. The sandy region reduces the distribution of reptile and frog species that are equipped for sandy terrains.

The sandy dunes of Western Australia have temperate mediterranean climate. The relatively damp and island-like refuge is surrounded by ocean and dry lands. Western heath dragons are small but specialists of this terrestrial habitat. Although there is a possibility that this lizard species is not only endemic to south-western Australia, their particularity in habitat has separated them from related species in other regions. They are an eminent component of the Western Australian region. They are plentiful, have detectable social behaviour and complex vivid patterns.

== Taxonomy ==
The Gnaraloo heath dragon belongs to the Squamata order and the family Agamidae. They are included in the Ctenophorus genus which consists of 33 species. Ctenophorus lizards are powerfully built ground-dwelling creatures. These species are generally terrestrial agamids found in Australia and they exhibit the fourth highest male to female ratio of relative tail lengths. Each Ctenophorus species can be distinguished by 3 clear ecological characteristics: associating with rocks, digging of burrows and using vegetation as shelter. Because of their terrestrial life and desert-like habitat, most of the taxa are diurnal ground lizards.

Originally, the parviceps species was under the Rankinia genus. However, studies showed how it was only distantly related and that molecular evidence indicates that Rankinia parviceps form a monophyletic genera with other Ctenophorus species. Hence, the western Rankinia have been transferred under the Ctenophorus genus. The taxonomic standing of south-western Rankinia is still undetermined.

From the Western Australian Museum, Glenn Storr, mainly contributed to agamid taxonomy. His work could be seen in a variety of species, including Ctenophorus parviceps 1964.

== Evolution ==
The Ctenophorus dragon lizards of Australia is one example of continent-wide adaptive radiation. Significant levels of divergence between Ctenophorus parviceps and related species can be traced back to specialisation in habitat as each species occurs in different botanical districts.

Their habitat has strong effects on the evolution of limb and body form in agamid lizards. Head and limb dimension variations between dragon lizards also occur due to differing their performance traits and behaviour. Terrestrial members of the Australian ctenophorus radiation have evolved different refuge-seeking strategies, including digging burrows in the sand or loose soils or hiding in areas covered by shrubs or grasses. The Gnaraloo heath dragon does not burrow, instead retreats to hiding areas such as rock crevices, shrubs, grass or sleep in the open. There are relatively low rates of evolution in terms of size and shape for the rock-dwelling Ctenophorus lineages such as the Gnaraloo heath dragon. Burrowing or maneuvering through complex habitats imposes more selective demands that contribute to higher levels of diversification for ground-dwelling Ctenophorus lineages.

Because of convergent evolution, similarities between agamids from various continents can be noticed. Agamids such as Pebble-mimicking dragons resemble certain species hailing from North America, Central Asia, South America and Australia.

In terms of evolution in colour patterns for the species, crypsis plays a key role. In order for Gnaraloo heath dragons to avoid detection by other animals or predators, their colour variation must adapt to their habitual background. This evolution of colour variation exhibits the necessity to avoid predation due to natural selection and discernable signalling functions to mate with other Ctenophorus parviceps lizards.

== Biology ==
Like all Ctenophorus species, they have relatively thin vascular blocks and less blood vessels in comparison to other Agamids. Their crests are used as a signal of territory. It is usually raised when taking territorial ownership then lowered once signalled.

The Gnaraloo heath dragon reproduces via oviparity. This means that the lizards eject undeveloped eggs rather than live offspring. Coitus occurs as the male briefly inserts its hemipenis whilst holding the female by the neck. The copulation process normally takes only about 25 seconds. Similar to some reptiles, this species lays its eggs which require maternal protection to ensure the young have properly hatched. Clutch size is largely affected by the lizard's body size. Hence, the small Gnaraloo heath dragons produce only a few eggs. There is at least 6 weeks between clutches. Usually there are 1 to 2 clutches, but a third clutch is theoretically possible. In late May into winter and spring, males begin spermatocytogenesis to be fully functional until December. If a male agamid's testes are regressing, they are unlikely to die like most males in January. As for females, ovulation occurs in October so that egg laying can begin at the end of the month. Most agamids have high mortality rates in late December.

The female and male lizards that survive until January have enlarged inguinal fat figures, females have regressed ovaries and males have regressed testes. For many Ctenophorus populations, few adults survive to make a second summer as smaller Ctenophorus species, such as Ctenophorus parviceps, usually have a year life span.

The Gnaraloo heath dragon's bright colouration and complex patterns are key players in intersexual signalling between other lizards. The reflectance of their scale patterns highly contrasts against their more dull coloured habitat. Their colouration signals receptivity, males prefer females with higher throat chroma. Gnaraloo heath dragon colouration also acts as camouflage and UV protection.

Reptiles produce non-hyperosmotic urine. In agamids, the urine travels to the cloaca and is then transported back to the colon for reabsorption to prevent water loss. In terms of feeding and detecting predators, agamids depend on sight mainly for this. Their sense of smell is vital for prey detection. Typically in the breeding season, males usually utilise their femoral glands to defend and mark their territory. This in combination with their colour patterns and crests aids in the mating process of Gnaraloo heath dragons.

Most Australian agamids are heliothermic, which means they obtain their heat primarily from the sun. Gnaraloo heath dragons bask in the sun to facilitate heat uptake to be able to begin foraging or daily activities.

== Threats ==
The Ctenophorus parviceps is not listed for conservation concern, but is threatened by habitat loss and degradation, climate change, death on roads, feral predators, cane toads, and emerging diseases. Gnaraloo heath dragons retreat to rock crevices and shrublands when threatened. Its habitat is shrinking in size with 75% of native plants being cleared, this makes it more difficult for these lizards to hide from predators.

Cane toads are a highly toxic and invasive species and currently occupy more than 1 million square kilometres in Australia. They are a predominant predator for Gnaraloo heath dragons as Australian reptiles are the most affected by the cane toad invasion. 59% of agamids are at risk from these toads. Ctenophorus parviceps have low resistance to toad toxin and are not capable of eating these toads.

Small prey birds such as falcons, Australian kestrels, and other sympatric birds in the same region as the Gnaraloo heath are also a major predator. These species have effective hunting strategies such as perch hunting and hovering to be able to catch Gnaraloo heath dragons which are fast reptile prey. Because of their diurnal nature and visibility, small birds are able to catch incautious Gnaraloo heath dragons from elevated positions.

== Behaviour ==
The species has enigmatic behavioural patterns and has only been recently recognised, Hence, this has contributed to the lack of literature concerning their ecology, biology and natural history. Lizards are not known for emitting vocal sounds. It is a rarity for a lizard species to make noises. Most Ctenophorus species are territorial and defend their areas from rocks or termite mounds. However, many Ctenophorus lizards communicate through head-bobbing as it is a determinant of species.

== Relationship with humans ==
Their behaviour limits their relationship with humans. Although most lizards would be interesting and easy to care for, all native reptiles in Australia, such as the Gnaraloo heath dragon, are protected. Hence, these reptiles cannot be taken from the wild or kept in captivity.
