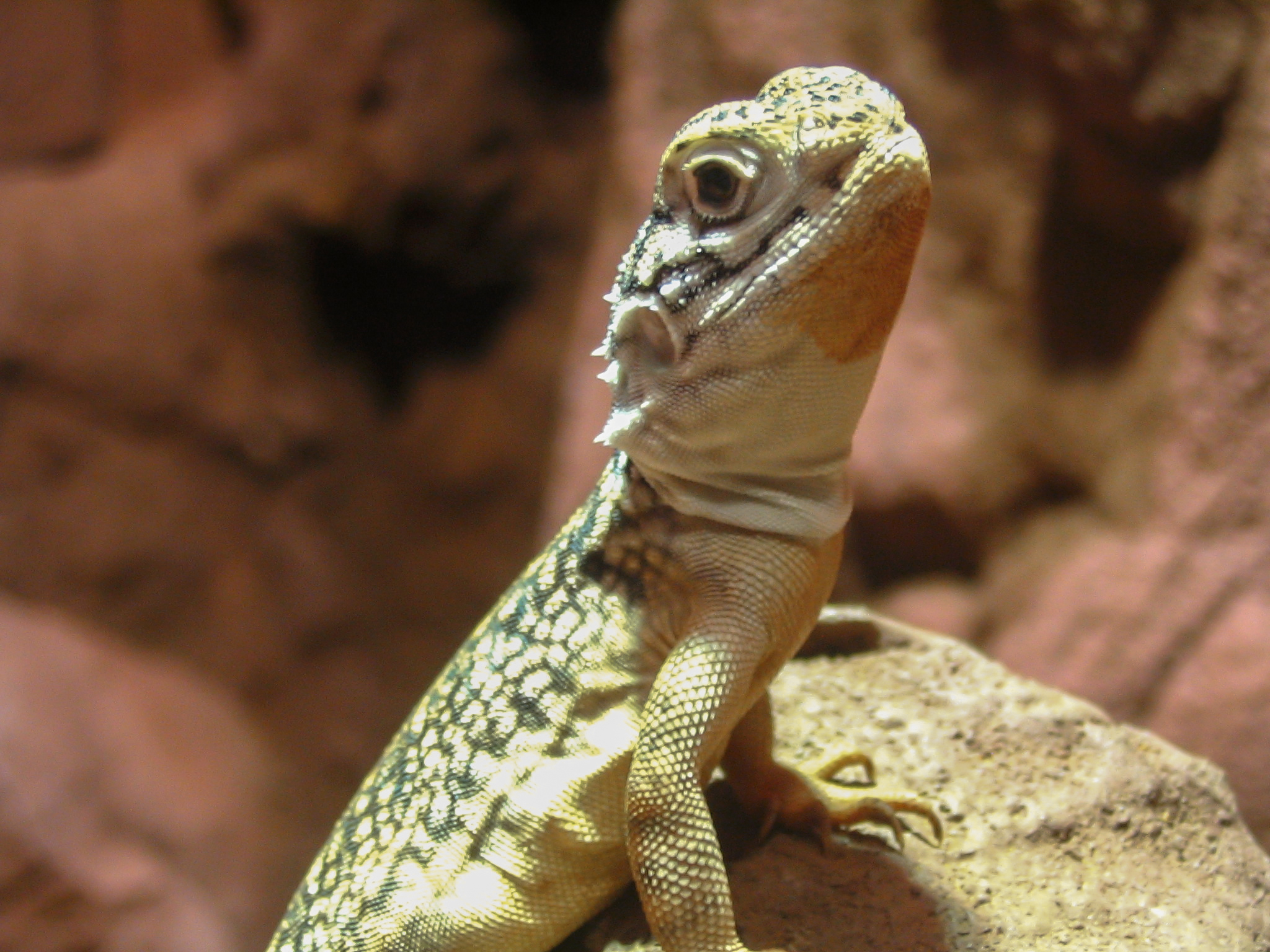
- Ctenophorus nuchalis, central netted dragon

Scientific classification
- Kingdom: Animalia
- Phylum: Chordata
- Class: Reptilia
- Order: Squamata
- Suborder: Iguania
- Family: Agamidae
- Subfamily: Amphibolurinae
- Genus: Ctenophorus; Fitzinger, 1843

Species
- 38 species, see text

= Ctenophorus =

Genus of lizards

Ctenophorus, from Ancient Greek κτείς (kteís), meaning "comb", and φόρος (phóros), meaning "bearing", is a genus of lizards, commonly known as comb-bearing dragons, found in Australia. They are in the dragon lizard family, known as Agamidae.

== Description ==
The genus contains the most diverse group of dragon lizards in Australia. It is the largest group of Australian lizards and it has an extensive radiation in the arid zones. Many of the species of Ctenophorus have been grouped by a similar morphology. The informal names and groupings within this genus — rock dragon, sand dragon, crevice-dragon, ground dragon, and bicycle-dragon — are named after the mythological creature, the dragon.

Lizards in the genus Ctenophorus may be confused with lizards in the genera Tympanocryptis and Diporiphora.

== Species ==
There were 34 recognised species in the genus until a new study published in June 2023 discovered four more in South Australia adding up to a total of 38 species. The new species are included in the list below.

- Ctenophorus adelaidensis (Gray, 1841) – western heath dragon
- Ctenophorus butlerorum (Storr, 1977) – Butler's dragon, Shark Bay heath dragon, Edel heath dragon
- Ctenophorus caudicinctus (Günther, 1875) – ring-tailed bicycle-dragon, ring-tailed dragon
- Ctenophorus chapmani (Storr, 1977) – Chapman's dragon, southern heath dragon, Bight heath dragon
- Ctenophorus clayi (Storr, 1967) – black-shouldered ground-dragon, black-collared dragon
- Ctenophorus cristatus (Gray 1841) – crested bicycle-dragon, crested dragon, bicycle dragon
- Ctenophorus decresii (A.M.C. Duméril & Bibron, 1837) – tawny crevice-dragon, tawny dragon
- Ctenophorus femoralis (Storr, 1965) – long-tailed sand dragon
- Ctenophorus fionni (Procter, 1923) – Peninsula crevice-dragon, Peninsula dragon
- Ctenophorus fordi (Storr, 1965) – Mallee dragon, Mallee sand dragon, Mallee military dragon
- Ctenophorus gibba (Houston, 1974) – Bulldust ground-dragon, gibber dragon
- Ctenophorus graafi (Storr, 1967) – Graaf's dragon
- Ctenophorus ibiri (Edwards & Hutchinson, 2023)
- Ctenophorus infans (Storr, 1967) – Laverton ring-tailed dragon
- Ctenophorus isolepis (Fischer, 1881) – central military dragon
- Ctenophorus kartiwarrui (Edwards & Hutchinson, 2023)
- Ctenophorus maculatus (Gray, 1831) – spotted military dragon, spotted dragon, spotted sand dragon
- Ctenophorus maculosus (F.J. Mitchell, 1948) – Lake Eyre dragon, salt-lake ground-dragon
- Ctenophorus mckenziei (Storr, 1981) – dwarf bicycle-dragon, McKenzie's dragon
- Ctenophorus mirrityana (McLean et al., 2013) – Barrier Range dragon
- Ctenophorus modestus (Ahl, 1926)
- Ctenophorus nguyarna Doughty, Maryan, Melville & J. Austin, 2007 – Lake Disappointment dragon
- Ctenophorus nuchalis (De Vis, 1884) – central netted dragon, central netted ground-dragon
- Ctenophorus ornatus (Gray, 1845) – ornate dragon, ornate crevice-dragon
- Ctenophorus parviceps (Storr, 1964) – Gnaraloo heath dragon, northwestern heath dragon
- Ctenophorus pictus (W. Peters, 1866) – painted dragon
- Ctenophorus reticulatus (Gray, 1845) – western netted dragon, western netted ground-dragon
- Ctenophorus rubens (Storr, 1965) – reddening sand-dragon, rufus sand dragon
- Ctenophorus rufescens (Stirling & Zietz, 1893) – rusty crevice-dragon, rusty dragon
- Ctenophorus salinarum (Storr, 1966) – saltpan ground-dragon, claypan dragon
- Ctenophorus scutulatus (Stirling & Zietz, 1893) – lozenge-marked dragon, lozenge-marked bicycle-dragon
- Ctenophorus slateri (Storr, 1967) – Slater's dragon
- Ctenophorus spinodomus Sadlier, Colgan, Beatson & Cogger, 2019 – Eastern Mallee dragon
- Ctenophorus tjakalpa (Edwards & Hutchinson, 2023)
- Ctenophorus tjantjalka Johnston, 1992 – ochre dragon
- Ctenophorus tuniluki (Edwards & Hutchinson, 2023)
- Ctenophorus vadnappa (Houston, 1974) – red-barred crevice-dragon, red-barred dragon
- Ctenophorus yinnietharra (Storr, 1981) – Yinnietharra crevice-dragon, Yinnietharra rock dragon

=== 2023 identification of new species ===
Danielle Edwards, curator of terrestrial vertebrates at the Museum and Art Gallery of the Northern Territory, and Mark Hutchinson, of the South Australian Museum, both started studying sand dragons in 2008, when only three species (C. fordi, C. femoralis, and C. maculatus) had been identified. Their June 2023 study published in the Journal of Herpetology provided additional morphological data from all of candidate species, which led to the recognition of 11 species. Of these, four taxa were found to be species rather than subspecies, with another four species newly described.

The four new species, all endemic to the state of South Australia, have been assigned names relating to their respective Aboriginal language of their habitat:

- C. ibiri – meaning "small lizard" in the Barngarla language; found in parts of the Eyre Peninsula
- C. kartiwarrui – a derivation of the Dieri language term "kartiwarru", meaning "red-backed lizard'; found in the Strzelecki Desert
- C. tjakalpa – named after the traditional name for the Great Victoria Desert, where it lives
- C. tuniluki – meaning "sand lizard" in the Ngarrindjeri language, which is found in the Mallee region along the River Murray

== Polymorphism ==
Lizards of the genus Ctenophorus are known to display colour polymorphism, more than one colour type being found within a population. It is believed that colour polymorphism in this group has evolved as a result of a combination of sexual selection and natural selection.

== See also ==
- Ctenophorus kartiwarru
