= Ctenophorus clayi =

Conservation status
- Least Concern (IUCN 3.1)

Scientific classification
- Kingdom: Animalia
- Phylum: Chordata
- Class: Reptilia
- Order: Squamata
- Suborder: Iguania
- Family: Agamidae
- Genus: Ctenophorus
- Species: C. clayi

Binomial name
- Ctenophorus clayi (Storr, 1967)

Synonyms
- Amphibolurus clayi Storr, 1967; Ctenophorus raffertyi Wells & Wellington, 1985; Ctenophorus clayi — Greer, 1991

Species of lizard

Ctenophorus clayi, also known commonly as the black-collared dragon, the black-shouldered ground-dragon, and Clay's dragon, is a species of lizard in the family Agamidae. The species is endemic to Australia.

== Etymology ==
The specific name, clayi, is in honor of Australian herpetologist Brian T. Clay (1950–2004).

== Geographic range and habitat ==
C. clayi occurs in red sand-ridges with spinifex in the central and western deserts of Australia, with an isolated population existing in North West Cape in Western Australia.

== Reproduction ==
C. clayi is oviparous.
