= Ctenophorus graafi =

Conservation status
- Least Concern (IUCN 3.1)

Scientific classification
- Kingdom: Animalia
- Phylum: Chordata
- Class: Reptilia
- Order: Squamata
- Suborder: Iguania
- Family: Agamidae
- Genus: Ctenophorus
- Species: C. graafi

Binomial name
- Ctenophorus graafi (Storr, 1967)

Synonyms
- Amphibolurus caudicinctus graafi (Storr, 1967); Tachyon graafi Wells & Wellington, 1985

Species of lizard

Ctenophorus graafi, or Graaf's dragon is a species of agamid lizard occurring in the far eastern interior of Western Australia.

It was formerly considered to be a subspecies of Ctenophorus caudicinctus.
