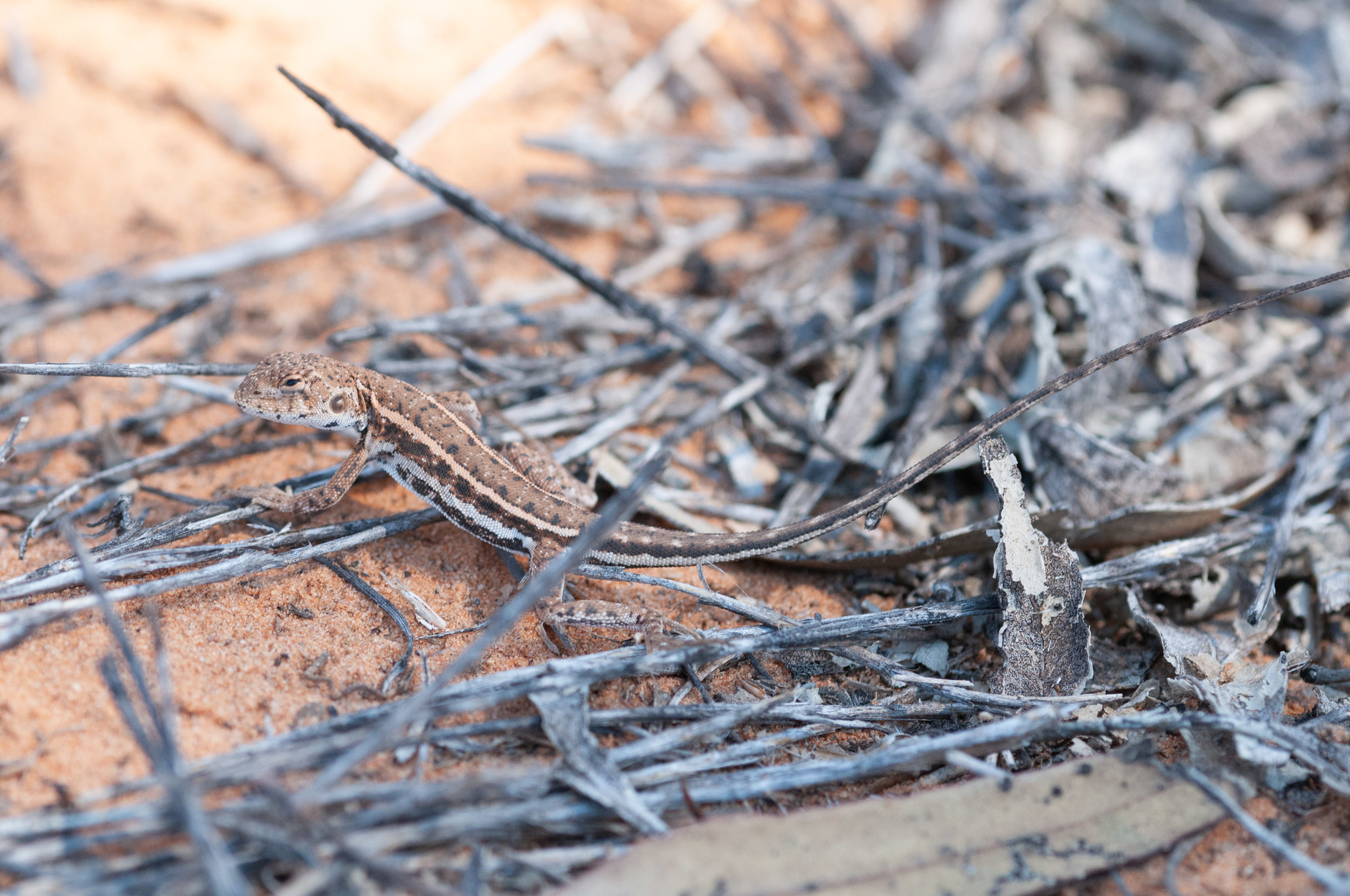

Conservation status
- Least Concern (IUCN 3.1)

Scientific classification
- Kingdom: Animalia
- Phylum: Chordata
- Class: Reptilia
- Order: Squamata
- Suborder: Iguania
- Family: Agamidae
- Genus: Ctenophorus
- Species: C. fordi

Binomial name
- Ctenophorus fordi (Storr, 1965)
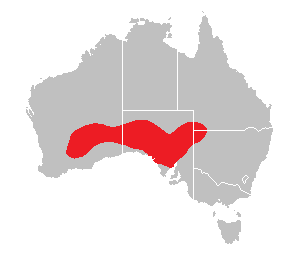
- Distribution of Ctenophorus fordi

Synonyms
- Amphibolurus fordi Storr, 1965; Phthanodon fordi — Wells & Wellington, 1985; Phthanodon hawkeswoodi Wells & Wellington, 1985; Ctenophorus fordi — Manthey & Schuster, 1999

= Mallee military dragon =

Species of lizard

The Mallee dragon (Ctenophorus fordi), also commonly known as the Mallee dragon and the Mallee sand-dragon, is a species of lizard in the family Agamidae. The species is native to the arid parts of southern Australia.

== Etymology ==
The Mallee military dragon's specific name, fordi, commemorates Dr. Julian Ralph Ford (1932–1987). Dr. Ford was an ornithologist, herpetologist and chemist who worked at the Western Australian Museum. He collected the lizard holotype and many of the paratypes.

== Description ==
C. fordi is a small endemic Australian lizard that grows to a maximum size of 5 cm (2.0 in) snout–vent length (SVL). C. fordi displays a dark reddish-orange colouration with a pale dorso-lateral stripe extending from the posterior region of the neck to the anterior portion of the tail. The pale stripe is bordered by a thin, black stripe. The dark orange-brown region enclosed by the pale stripe is flecked with small pale spots.

== Geographic range ==
C. fordi is found in south-eastern Western Australia, through central South Australia, and into the north-west corner of New South Wales and south-west corner of Queensland. What were previously considered to be populations occurring in south-east South Australia, western Victoria and central New South Wales, were reclassified in 2019 as a separate species; the Eastern Mallee dragon.

== Habitat ==
The Mallee military dragon (Ctenophorus fordi) primarily inhabits regions characterised by shrubs and hummock grass. These lizards thrive in sandy arid to semi-arid environments, particularly favoring the unique ecosystems of Mallee woodland and spinifex. They are commonly found in vegetated sand dunes, where the intricate mix of flora offers both shelter and hunting grounds.

In addition to these primary habitats, the Mallee military dragon can sometimes be found in open sandy areas adjacent to these woodlands, where they utilise the loose soil for burrowing. Their burrows, often located near the bases of spinifex clumps, offer refuge from extreme temperatures and predators. The presence of various shrubs and grasses in these areas contributes to a diverse diet and a complex habitat structure, essential for the dragon's lifecycle.

Overall, the Mallee military dragon's habitat is intricately tied to the health and age of the Mallee ecosystems, with an emphasis on mature spinifex coverage that supports their ecological needs.

== Behaviour ==
Mallee military dragons (Ctenophorus fordi) emerge from dormancy in August, with males appearing about four weeks earlier than females. They are active even on very hot days, foraging in sandy, open areas and dashing for cover into nearby grasses or low bushes if disturbed or pursued. Males are territorial.

The signaling behavior of C. fordi consists almost exclusively of head bobs, which both males and females produce when encountering another individual. A study by Gibbons and Lillywhite (1981) found that head bobbing is used for species recognition, sex identification, and signaling dominance status in Mallee dragons.

== Diet ==
The Mallee military dragon (Ctenophorus fordi) has a diet that consists largely of ants, with ants making up a significant portion (30-50%) of its total food intake. As an ant specialist, C. fordi exploits a food source that most other lizards avoid.

Ants are abundant in the sandy, arid environments inhabited by the Mallee dragon. Different ant species are available seasonally, providing a reliable food source throughout the lizard's active period from spring through summer. C. fordi ambushes ants and other small insects and arthropods that wander within striking distance, employing a sit-and-wait predatory strategy.

In addition to ants, the Mallee dragon's diet includes a variety of other small invertebrates found in its habitat, such as spiders, beetles, and other insects. The larger the individual lizard, the larger the prey it can consume, with the largest dragons occasionally eating small lizards.

Ontogenetic shifts in diet, where juveniles and adults consume different prey, are common in many lizard species. However, there is no evidence of Mallee dragons undergoing such shifts, with ants remaining a dietary staple across all life stages.

The specialized tricuspid teeth of C. fordi are adapted for an insectivorous diet, allowing it to efficiently capture and consume ants and other small prey. Its diet provides the necessary nutrients and energy for growth, reproduction, and survival in the harsh desert environment.

== Reproduction ==
The Mallee military dragon reproduces sexually, with an oviparous and dioecious reproduction method. Mating occurs in spring. Females produces sequential clutches of two to five eggs over the reproductive season and the offspring hatch from December to March. Males are not territorial and there has been no evidence of male-male aggression.

== Conservation actions ==
The species C. fordi is listed under the IUCN Red List of Threatened Species as a species of "Least Concern". The Mallee military dragon occurs in several protected areas, including the Sturt National Park in New South Wales, and the Currawinya National Park in Queensland.

== Threats ==
The Mallee military dragon is vulnerable to various threats. These include:

- Habitat loss from land clearing, degradation by introduced species such as cattle and rabbits, and modification caused by climate change
- Death on roads
- Predation by introduced species such as dogs, cats, pigs, and foxes
- Threats from emerging diseases
