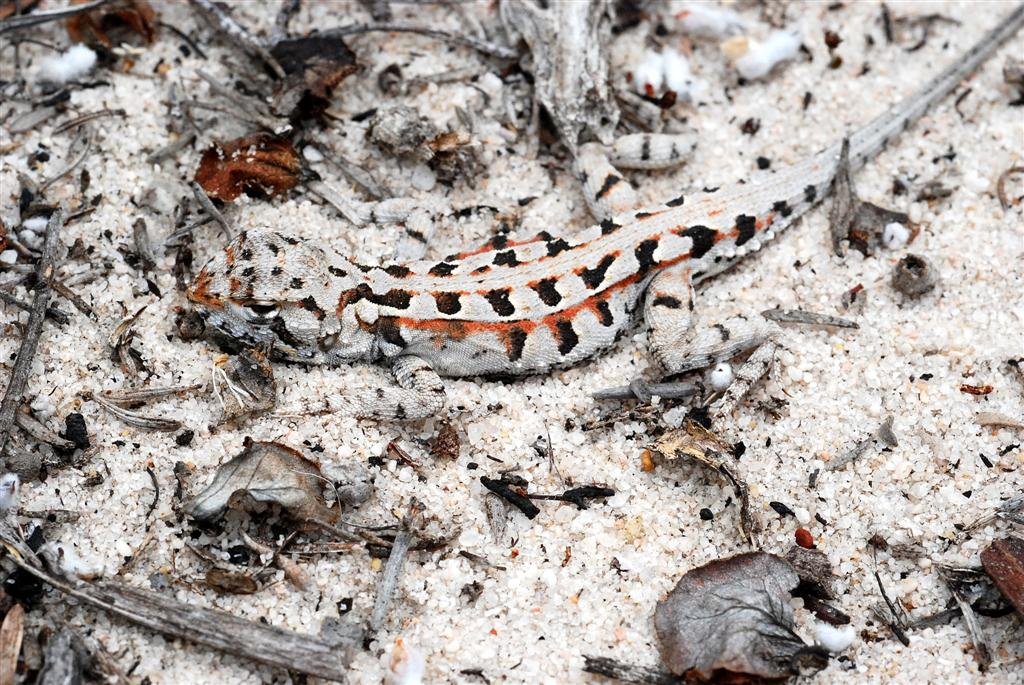

Conservation status
- Least Concern (IUCN 3.1)

Scientific classification
- Kingdom: Animalia
- Phylum: Chordata
- Class: Reptilia
- Order: Squamata
- Suborder: Iguania
- Family: Agamidae
- Genus: Ctenophorus
- Species: C. adelaidensis

Binomial name
- Ctenophorus adelaidensis (Gray, 1841)
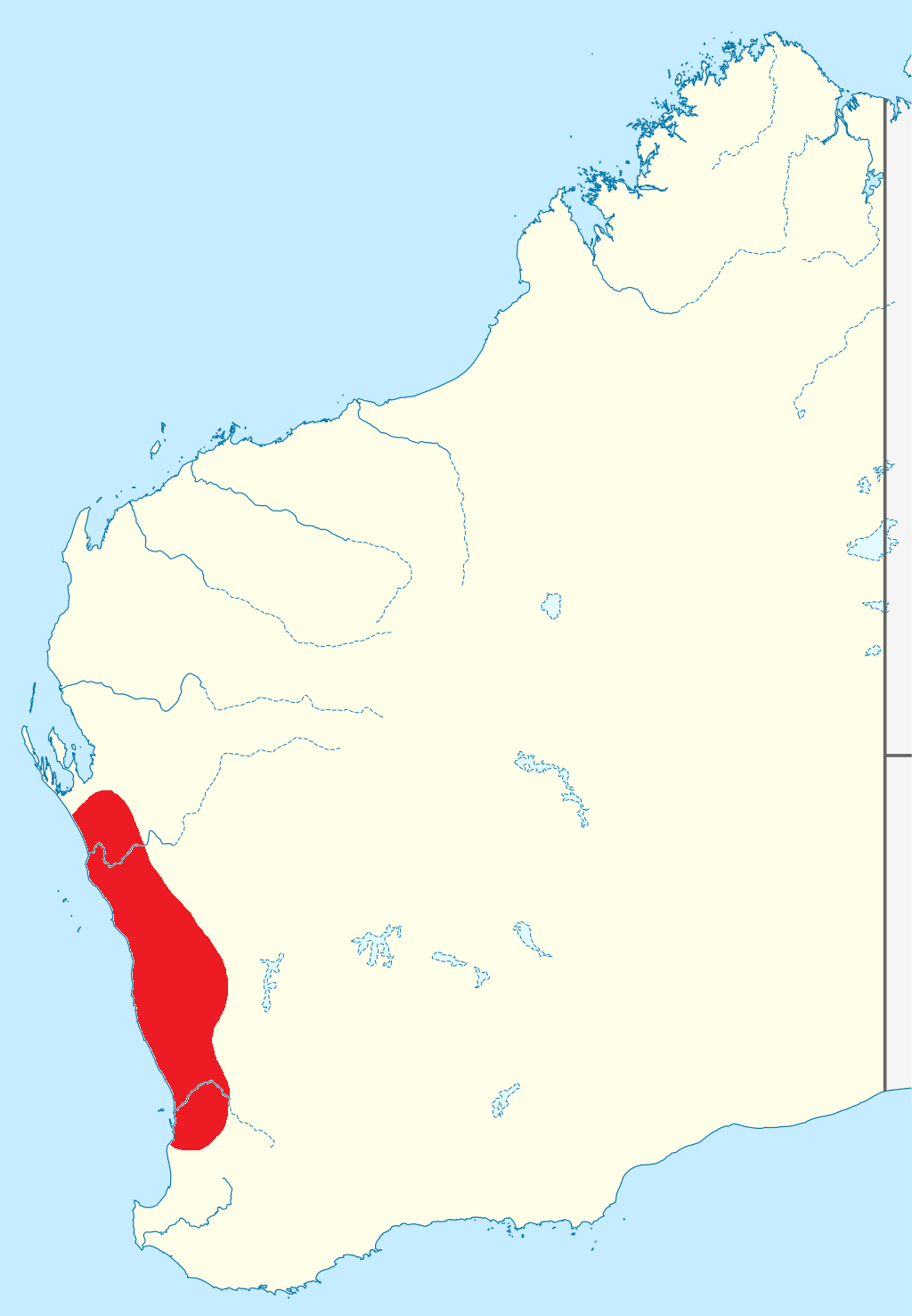
- Distribution of Ctenophorus adelaidensis

Synonyms
- Amphibolurus adelaidensis (Gray, 1841); Amphibolurus adelaidensis pulcherrimus (Glauert, 1959); Amphibolurus pulcherrimus (Boulenger, 1885); Grammatophora muricata adelaidensis (Gray, 1841); Rankinia adelaidensis (Gray, 1841); Tympanocryptis adelaidensis (Gray, 1841)

= Ctenophorus adelaidensis =

Western heath dragon

Species of lizard

Ctenophorus adelaidensis, commonly known as the western heath dragon is a species of agamid lizard occurring in sandplains with heath and banksia along the lower coast of Western Australia, between Kalbarri and Perth. Adults are grey in colour, with dark blotches. They are relatively slow compared to other Ctenophorus species, preferring to scuttle rather than sprint.

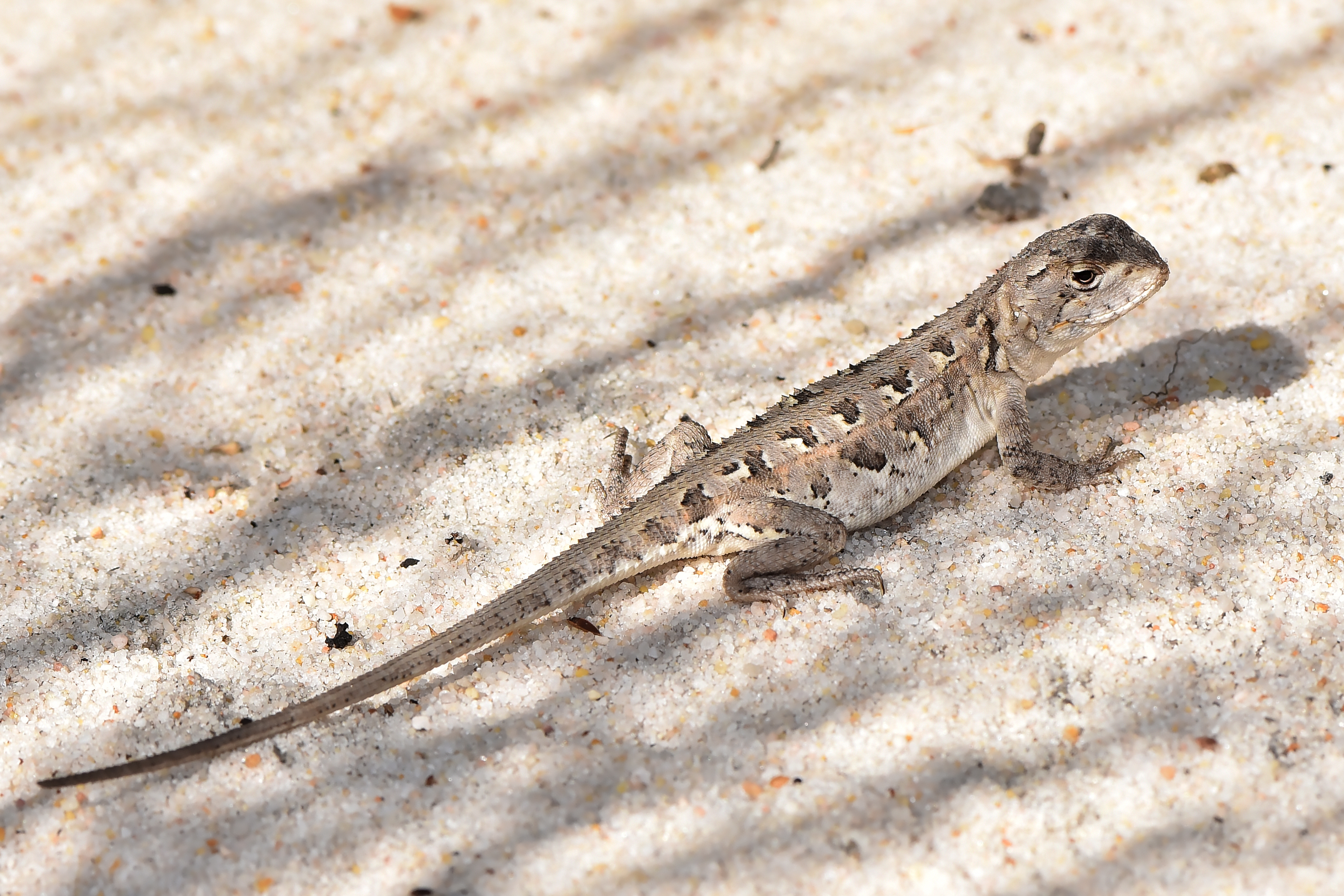
Western heath dragon
