= Pierre-Justin-Marie Macquart =

French entomologist (1778–1855)

- Born: April 8, 1778; Hazebrouck
- Died: November 25, 1855 (aged 77); Lille
- Known for: Studies on European and exotic Diptera, description of numerous new fly species
- Scientific career
- Fields: Entomology, dipterology
- Workplaces: Musée d'Histoire Naturelle de Lille
- Author abbrev. (zoology): Macquart

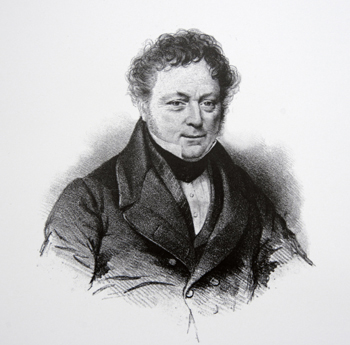

Pierre-Justin-Marie Macquart (Note: He used the name "J. Macquart" in his writings and signature.) (French pronunciation: [pjɛʁ ʒystɛ̃ maʁi makaʁ]; 8 April 1778 – 25 November 1855) was a French entomologist specialising in the study of flies. He worked on world species as well as European and described many new species.

== Biography ==
=== Early life ===
Macquart was born in Hazebrouck, on 8 April 1778. He was interested in natural history from an early age due to his older brother who was an ornithologist and a Fellow of the Société de Sciences de l’Agriculture et des Arts de la Ville de Lille and whose bird collection became the foundation of the societies museum, the Musée d'Histoire Naturelle de Lille. A second brother founded a botanic garden with a collection of over 3000 species of plants. Macquart, too became interested in natural history. In 1796, he joined the staff of General Armand Samuel then campaigning in the Revolutionary Wars. He was a secretary and draftsman. The general staff was stationed in Schwetzingen, then Heidelberg, Mainz, Aarau, Basel and Zürich. He left the army in 1798 returning to Lille with German books, insects and birds.

=== French Diptera, Meigen and Marriage ===
He then worked full-time on insects and studying in the library and on 27 Nivôse, Year 11 of the French Revolutionary Calendar (1802) he was elected a Fellow of the Société de Sciences de l’Agriculture et des Arts de la Ville de Lille. Soon he began travelling around France and went several times to Paris where he met Pierre André Latreille who suggested to specialize on Diptera, following the pioneering work of Johann Wilhelm Meigen. After some time in Holland he married and moved from Hazebrouck to Lestrem where he became mayor, from 1817 to 1852, then a member of the Conseil général of Pas-de-Calais.

At this time he began intensive studies of Diptera examining the collections of Henri Marie Ducrotay de Blainville, Étienne Geoffroy Saint-Hilaire, André Étienne d'Audebert de Férussac, Amédée Louis Michel le Peletier, comte de Saint-Fargeau, Jean Guillaume Audinet-Serville, Alexandre Louis Lefèbvre de Cérisy, Gaspard Auguste Brullé and François Louis de la Porte, comte de Castelnau in France. He also went to Hamburg where Wilhelm von Winthem had assembled the largest collection of Diptera in the world. At the age of 25 he was one of the founders of the Société d’Amateurs des Sciences et Arts de la Ville de Lille. Many of his publications were published in the Mémoires of this Society. He also expanded the natural history holdings of the Musee d'Histoire Naturelle de Lille.

His early taxonomic work included the Insectes diptères du nord de la France, published in Lille in 4 parts from 1826-1829. This prompted Latreille to enlist him as the author of the Diptera volumes of Suites à Buffon under his editorship. This arrangement was continued by Nicolas Roret when Latreille became ill. Two volumes were published (1834-1835) as Histoire naturelle des insectes Dipteres where non-European as well as European Diptera were treated.

In 1839, Macquart visited Johann Wilhelm Meigen, then aged 75, in Stolberg, purchasing his notes and drawings and bringing his collection to Paris where it is now in the Muséum national d'histoire naturelle. This established Macquart as Meigen's successor and Paris as the centre of Dipterology.

=== Exotic Diptera ===
The only works on exotic (non-European) Diptera at this time were those of Christian Rudolph Wilhelm Wiedemann particularly Diptera exotica (1820–1821) and Aussereuropaischen Diptera (1828-1830). Wiedemann had not seen the imposing collections in Paris and these were to occupy Macquart for the rest of his life. He described nearly 2,000 new species in his Insectes diptères exotiques nouveaux ou peu connus (1838–1855) which lists the collections examined to that date. They are those of: Jules Dumont d'Urville with René-Primevère Lesson (the largest including material from the Falkland Islands, the coast of Chile and Peru, the southern and western Pacific, Australia, New Zealand and New Guinea); Justin Goudot who had explored South America from 1822 (and continued to until 1842); a Louis Pilate who was based in Georgia and Louisiana U.S.A. but lived for five years in Mérida, Yucatán; Auguste Sallé, a young collector later to become a Paris insect dealer with South American connections; Alcide Charles Victor Marie Dessalines d'Orbigny who between 1826 and 1823 had travelled, on a mission for the Paris Museum, into Brazil, Argentina, Paraguay, Chile, Bolivia and Peru returning France with an enormous collection of more than 10,000 natural history specimens; Peter Clausen (c. 1804–1855) a Danish naturalist who collected in Brazil, a M. Giesebrecht, Étienne Geoffroy Saint-Hilaire (Diptera from Egypt) and three members of a Belgian Commission for the exploration of tropical countries, August Giesebreght (1810–1893), Nicholas Funk (1817–1896) and Jean Jules Linden (1817–1898). Material continued to pour into the museum from these and other sources as Macquarts reputation spread.

=== Later life ===
In 1845, Macquart went to Switzerland to see Maximilian Perty and from there to Germany, aware that events were moving rapidly to the revolutions of 1848. This was his last journey outside Paris. He died on 25 November 1888, aged 77, in Lille, and is buried there.

== Societies ==
Macquart was a Member of the Entomological Society of Stettin, the Linnean Society of London and the Société entomologique de France.

== Selected works ==
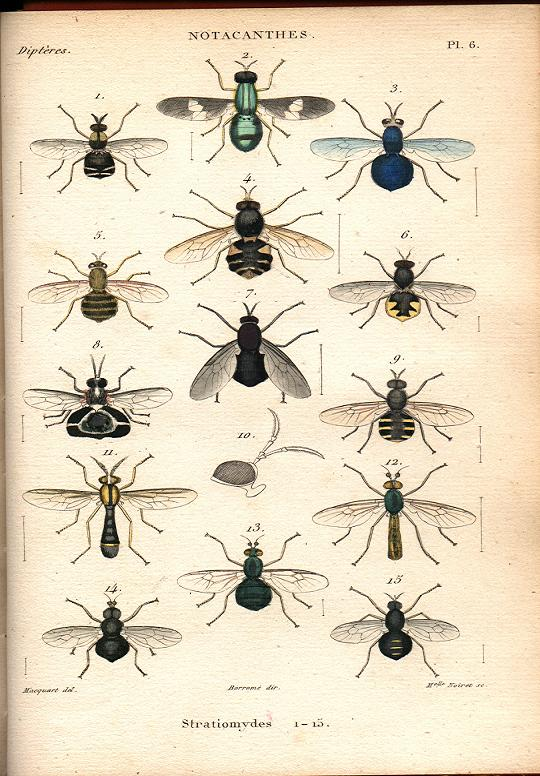
A plate from Histoire naturelle des insectes. Dipteres

- 1811. Mémoire sur les plantations dans le département du Nord. Séance Publique de la Société des Sciences de Lille, 4, 116–131. (first published paper)
- 1819. Notice sur les insectes Hemiptères du genre Psylle. Seanc Soc Sci Agr Arts Lille 5: 81-86.
- 1826 Insectes diptères du nord de la France 1 and 2 Asiliques, bombyliers, xylotomes, leptides, vésiculeux, stratiomydes, xylophagites, tabaniens Lille : impr. L. Danel.
- 1827 Insectes diptères du nord de la France 3 Platypézines, dolichopodes, empides, hybotides Lille : impr. L. Danel.
- 1829 Insectes diptères du nord de la France 4, Syrphies Lille : impr. L. Danel.
- 1834-1835. Histoire naturelle des insectes. Dipteres Paris : Roret.
- 1838 Insectes diptères exotiques nouveaux ou peu connus. Two volumes. Paris: Roret.

All these works are available as free electronic texts from the National Library of France, Gallica.

- 1839 Diptéres. In ‘ Histoire naturelle des Iles Canaries,’ by Philip Barker Webb and Sabin Berthelot,

vol. 2, pt. 2, p. 97. Paris.

- 1842 Diptères exotiques nouveaux ou peu connus Mémoires Soc Sci Agr Arts Lille 1841(1): 62-200.
- 1843 Diptères exotiques nouveaux ou peu connus Mémoires Soc Sci Agr Arts Lille 1842: 162-460.
- 1848 Diptères exotiques nouveaux ou peu connus Mémoires Soc Sci Agr Arts Lille 1847(2): 161-237.
- 1850 Facultés intérieures des Animaux invertébrés. 8vo. Lille. This includes an 80-page autobiography.
- 1855 Diptères exotiques nouveaux ou peu connus Mémoires Soc Sci Agr Arts Lille (2)1: 25-156.

== Collections ==
- Natural History Museum, Lille, France
- Hope Department of Entomology Oxford University Museum, England
- Muséum national d'Histoire naturelle Paris Natural History Museum, France.
