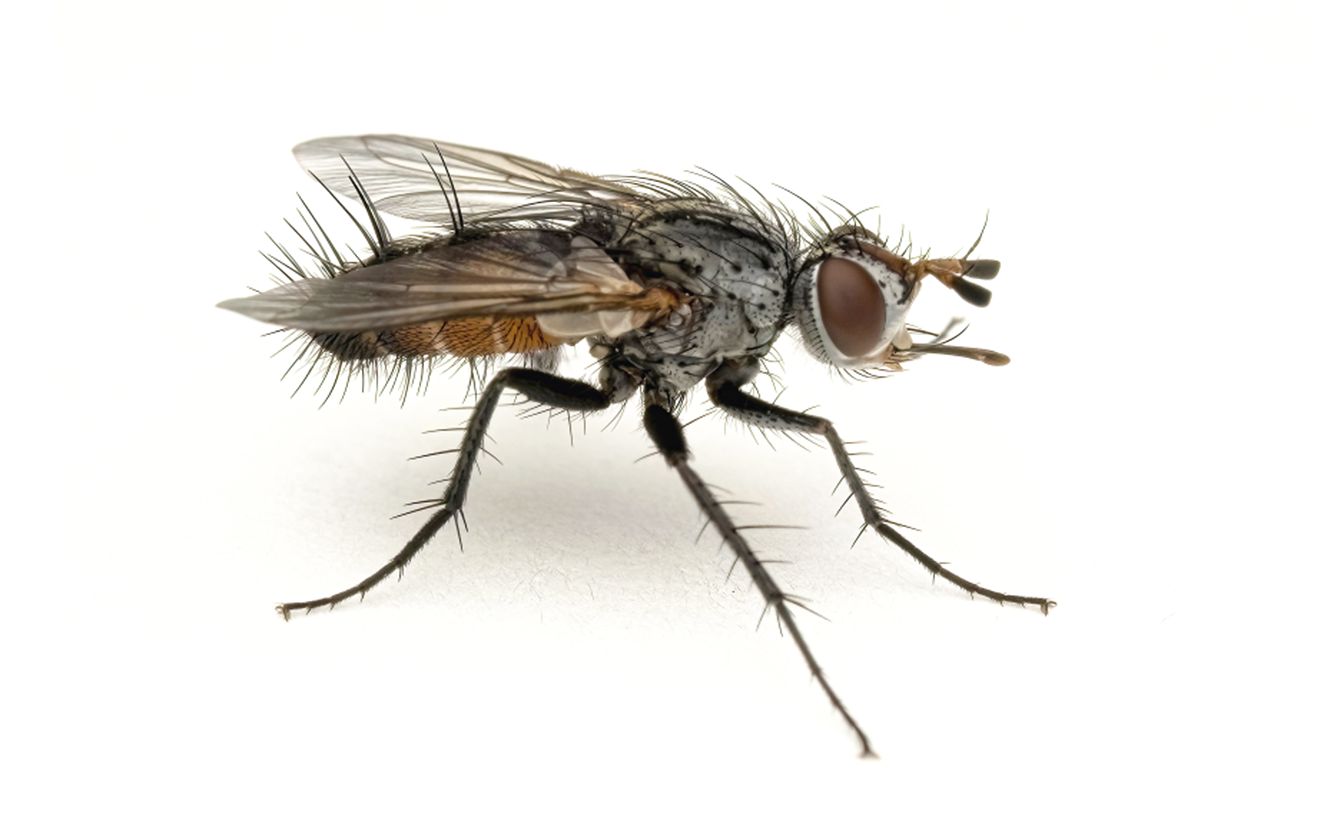
- Aphria latifrons

Scientific classification
- Kingdom: Animalia
- Phylum: Arthropoda
- Class: Insecta
- Order: Diptera
- Family: Tachinidae
- Subfamily: Tachininae
- Tribe: Leskiini
- Genus: Aphria; Robineau-Desvoidy, 1830

Type species
- Aphria abdominalis Robineau-Desvoidy, 1830

Species
- See text

= Aphria (fly) =

Genus of flies

Aphria is a genus of flies in the family Tachinidae.

== Species ==
- A. georgiana Townsend, 1908
- A. gracilis Mesnil, 1963
- A. latifrons (Villeneuve, 1908)
- A. longilingua (Rondani, 1861)
- A. longirostris (Meigen, 1824)
- A. miranda Richter, 1977
- A. ocypterata Townsend, 1891
- A. potans Wiedemann, 1830
- A. rubida Mesnil, 1973
- A. servillii Robineau-Desvoidy, 1830
- A. xyphias (Pandellé, 1896)
