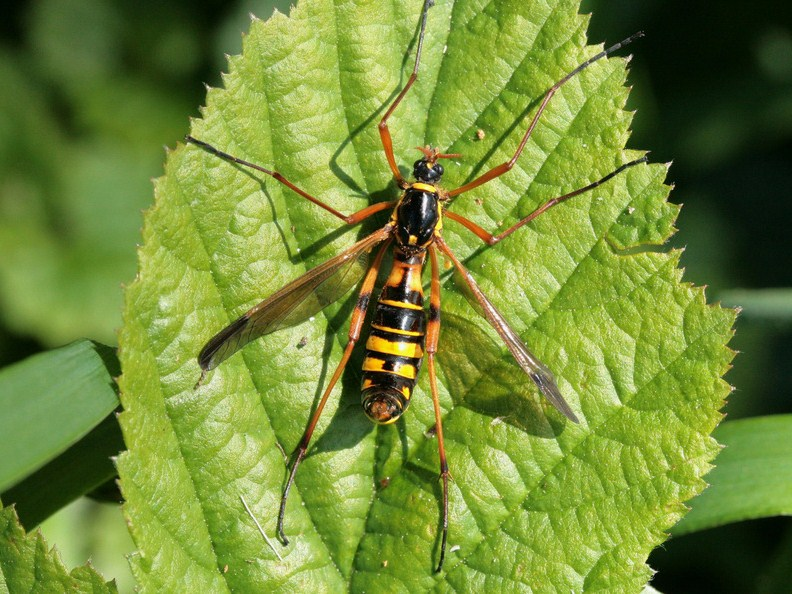
- In Netherlands

Scientific classification
- Kingdom: Animalia
- Phylum: Arthropoda
- Class: Insecta
- Order: Diptera
- Family: Tipulidae
- Genus: Ctenophora
- Species: C. elegans

Binomial name
- Ctenophora elegans Meigen, 1818

Synonyms
- Ctenophora (Ctenophora) pilosa (Pierre, 1924); Ctenophora pilosa (Pierre, 1924)

= Ctenophora elegans =

Species of fly

Ctenophora elegans is a species of true crane fly found in Europe.
