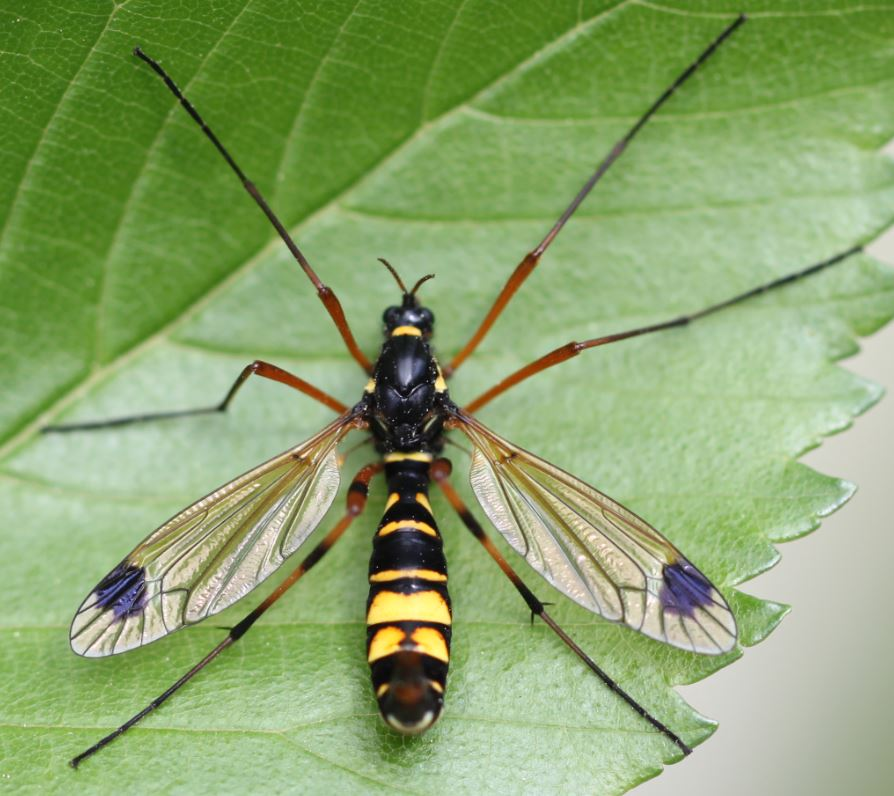
- Female

Scientific classification
- Kingdom: Animalia
- Phylum: Arthropoda
- Class: Insecta
- Order: Diptera
- Family: Tipulidae
- Genus: Ctenophora
- Species: C. festiva

Binomial name
- Ctenophora festiva Meigen, 1804

= Ctenophora festiva =

Species of fly

Ctenophora festiva is a true crane fly species in the genus Ctenophora. It is found in Europe.
