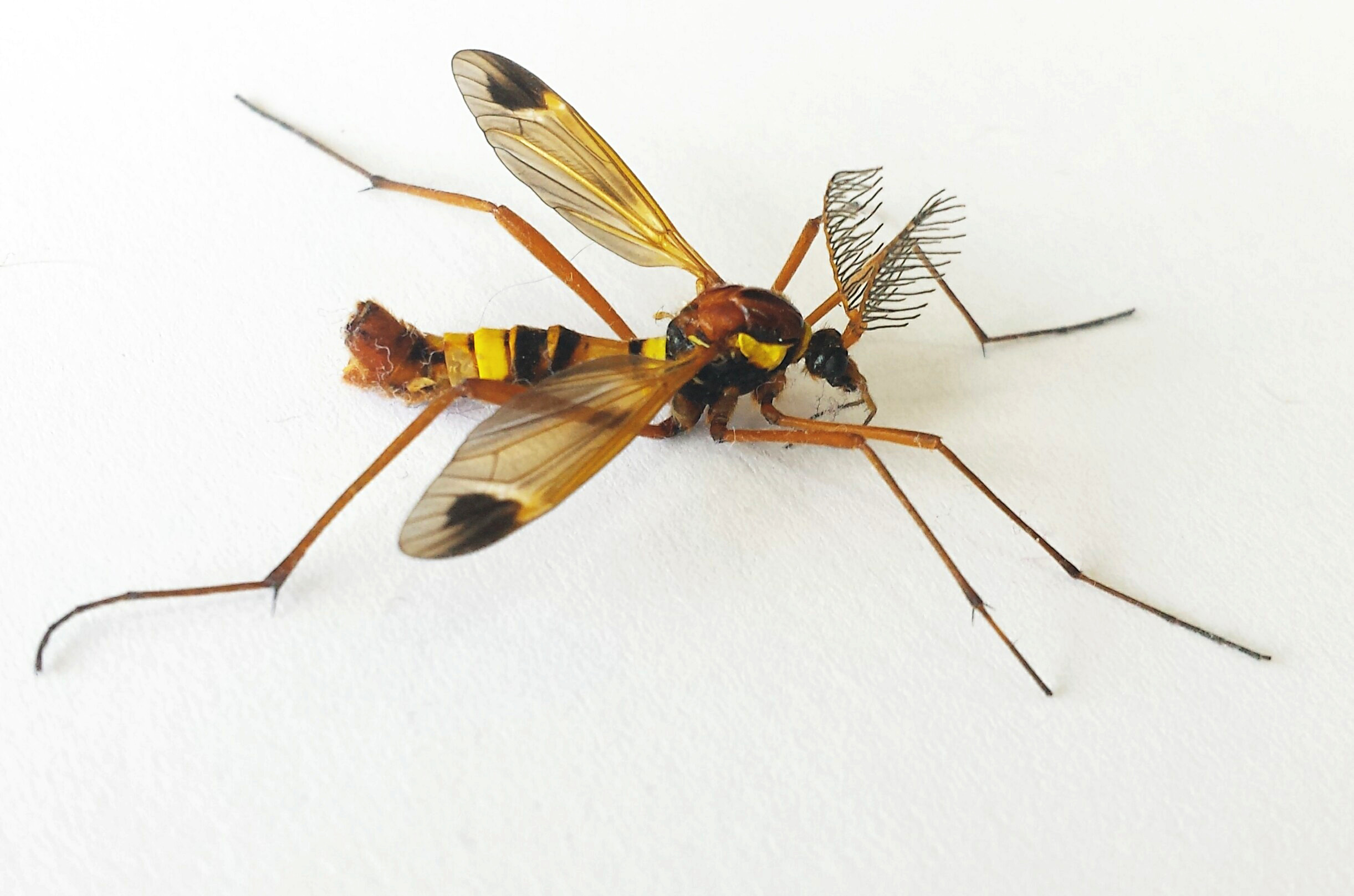
- Ctenophora ornata, captured 27th May 2017 in Courbevoie, France

Scientific classification
- Kingdom: Animalia
- Phylum: Arthropoda
- Class: Insecta
- Order: Diptera
- Family: Tipulidae
- Genus: Ctenophora
- Species: C. ornata

Binomial name
- Ctenophora ornata Meigen, 1818

= Ctenophora ornata =

Species of fly

Ctenophora ornata is a true crane fly species in the genus Ctenophora.

It is found in Europe.
