= Thaumatomyia grata =

Scientific classification
- Domain: Eukaryota
- Kingdom: Animalia
- Phylum: Arthropoda
- Class: Insecta
- Order: Diptera
- Family: Chloropidae
- Genus: Thaumatomyia
- Species: T. grata

Binomial name
- Thaumatomyia grata (Loew, 1863)

Synonyms
- Chlorops grata Loew, 1863

Species of fly

Thaumatomyia grata is a species of grass fly in the family Chloropidae.
