= Thaumatomyia rubida =

Scientific classification
- Kingdom: Animalia
- Phylum: Arthropoda
- Class: Insecta
- Order: Diptera
- Family: Chloropidae
- Genus: Thaumatomyia
- Species: T. rubida

Binomial name
- Thaumatomyia rubida (Coquillett, 1898)

Synonyms
- Chlorops rubida Coquillett, 1898

Species of fly

Thaumatomyia rubida is a species of grass fly in the family Chloropidae that occurs in California. This species is yellow/orange in coloration and grows 2-3 millimeters in length.
