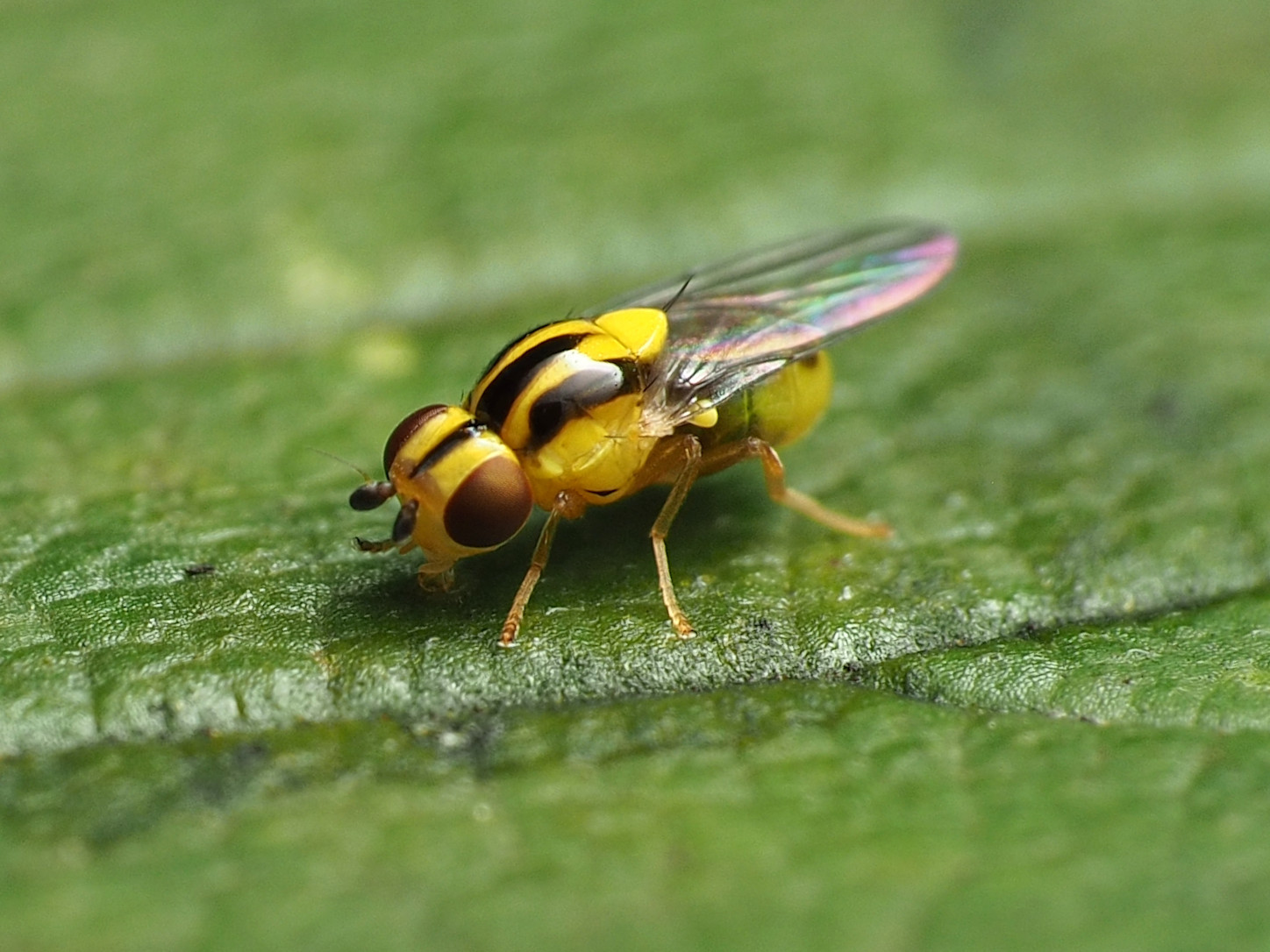

Scientific classification
- Kingdom: Animalia
- Phylum: Arthropoda
- Class: Insecta
- Order: Diptera
- Family: Chloropidae
- Genus: Thaumatomyia
- Species: T. glabra

Binomial name
- Thaumatomyia glabra (Meigen, 1830)

Synonyms
- Chlorops assimilis Macquart, 1851; Chlorops glabra Meigen, 1830; Chlorops halteralis Adams, 1903; Chlorops hortensis Fitch, 1872; Chlorops trivialis Loew, 1863; Siphonella obesa Fitch, 1856

= Thaumatomyia glabra =

Species of fly

Thaumatomyia glabra is a species of grass fly in the family Chloropidae.

T. glabra has been shown to be attracted to methyl anthranilate, which can be found in plants such as Iris pallida.
