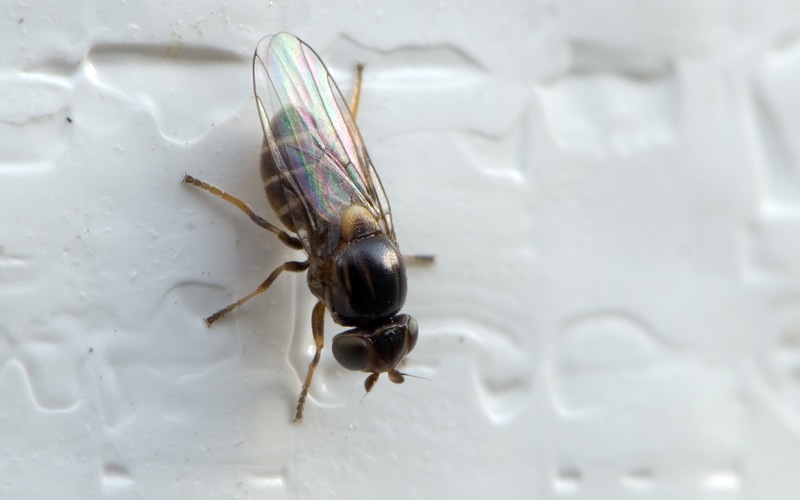

Scientific classification
- Kingdom: Animalia
- Phylum: Arthropoda
- Class: Insecta
- Order: Diptera
- Family: Chloropidae
- Genus: Thaumatomyia
- Species: T. annulata

Binomial name
- Thaumatomyia annulata (Walker, 1849)

Synonyms
- Chloropisca marianapolitana Ouellet, 1934; Chloropisca prolifica Osten Sacken, 1888; Chlorops annulata Walker, 1849; Chlorops variceps Loew, 1863

= Thaumatomyia annulata =

Species of fly

Thaumatomyia annulata is a species of grass fly in the family Chloropidae.
