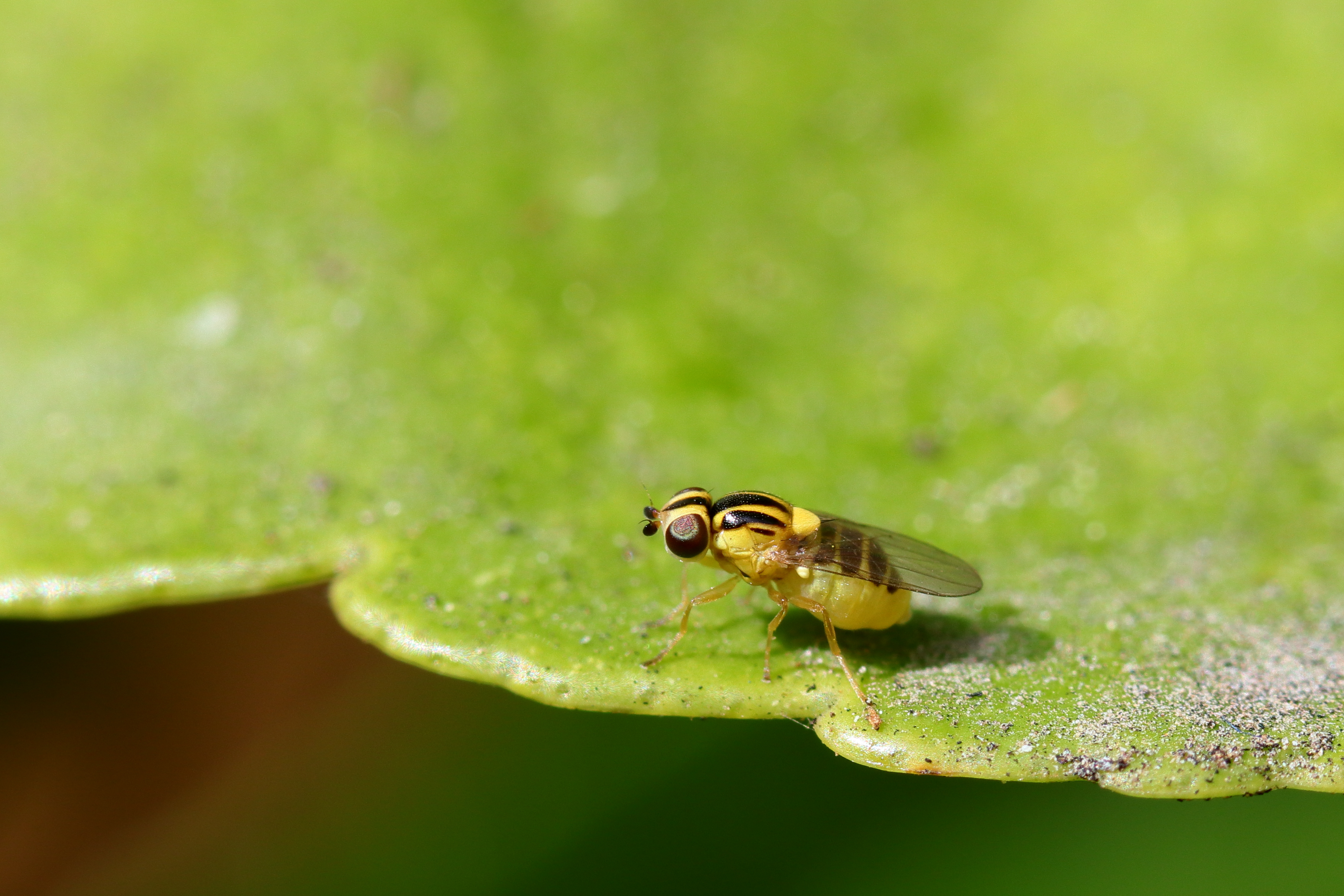
- Thaumatomyia notata

Scientific classification
- Domain: Eukaryota
- Kingdom: Animalia
- Phylum: Arthropoda
- Class: Insecta
- Order: Diptera
- Family: Chloropidae
- Subfamily: Chloropinae
- Genus: Thaumatomyia; Zenker, 1833

= Thaumatomyia =

Genus of flies

Thaumatomyia is a genus of flies in the family Chloropidae.

== Species ==
Species within this genus include:

- Thaumatomyia annulata
- Thaumatomyia apache
- Thaumatomyia appropinqua
- Thaumatomyia bistriata
- Thaumatomyia brasiliensis
- Thaumatomyia cicatricosa
- Thaumatomyia columbiana
- Thaumatomyia convexa
- Thaumatomyia czernyi
- Thaumatomyia egregia
- Thaumatomyia elongatula
- Thaumatomyia flavifrons
- Thaumatomyia gemina
- Thaumatomyia glabra
- Thaumatomyia glabrina
- Thaumatomyia grata
- Thaumatomyia hallandica
- Thaumatomyia himalayensis
- Thaumatomyia indica
- Thaumatomyia longicollis
- Thaumatomyia luteolimbata
- Thaumatomyia megacera
- Thaumatomyia montana
- Thaumatomyia natalensis
- Thaumatomyia nigrescens
- Thaumatomyia nigrifemur
- Thaumatomyia nigriscens
- Thaumatomyia notata
- Thaumatomyia obtusa
- Thaumatomyia oculata
- Thaumatomyia pallida
- Thaumatomyia parviceps
- Thaumatomyia pulla
- Thaumatomyia pullipes
- Thaumatomyia rubida
- Thaumatomyia rubrivittata
- Thaumatomyia rufa
- Thaumatomyia ruficornis
- Thaumatomyia rufithorax
- Thaumatomyia secunda
- Thaumatomyia semicolon
- Thaumatomyia subnotata
- Thaumatomyia sulcifrons
- Thaumatomyia sulfurifrons
- Thaumatomyia trifasciata
