= Ctenophora apicata =

Scientific classification
- Domain: Eukaryota
- Kingdom: Animalia
- Phylum: Arthropoda
- Class: Insecta
- Order: Diptera
- Family: Tipulidae
- Genus: Ctenophora
- Species: C. apicata

Binomial name
- Ctenophora apicata Osten Sacken, 1864

Species of fly

Ctenophora apicata is a species of large crane fly in the family Tipulidae.
