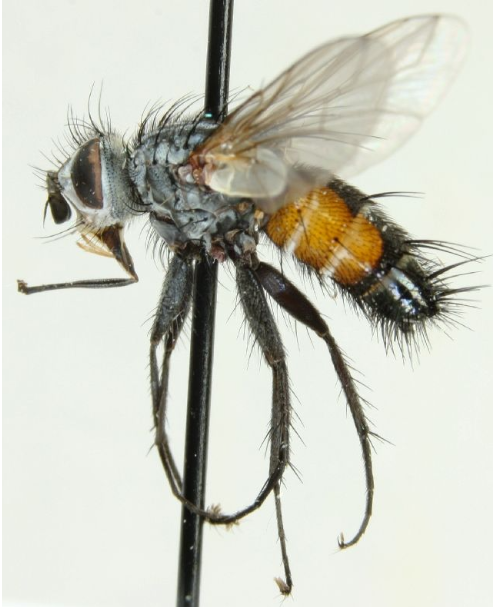

Scientific classification
- Kingdom: Animalia
- Phylum: Arthropoda
- Clade: Pancrustacea
- Class: Insecta
- Order: Diptera
- Family: Tachinidae
- Genus: Aphria
- Species: A. longirostris

Binomial name
- Aphria longirostris (Meigen, 1824)

Synonyms
- Aphria abdominalis Robineau-Desvoidy, 1830; Tachina longirostris Meigen, 1824

= Aphria longirostris =

Species of fly

Aphria longirostris is a species of fly in the family Tachinidae. It is found in Europe.
