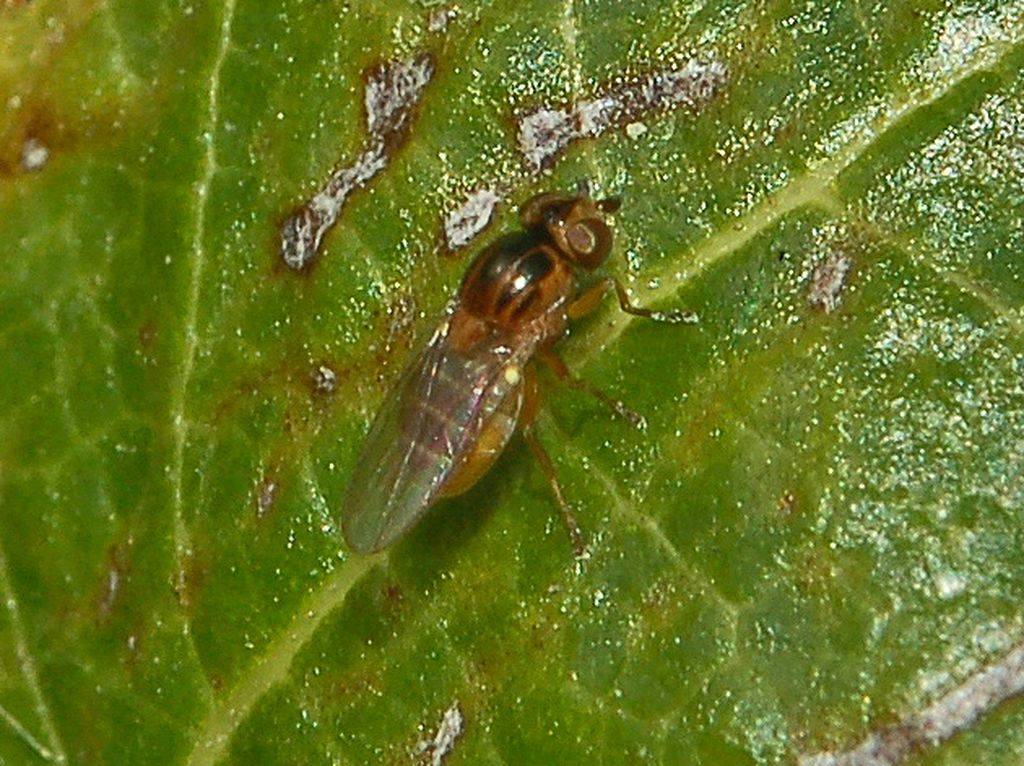
- Thaumatomyia cf. notata

Scientific classification
- Kingdom: Animalia
- Phylum: Arthropoda
- Clade: Pancrustacea
- Class: Insecta
- Order: Diptera
- Family: Chloropidae
- Genus: Thaumatomyia
- Species: T. notata

Binomial name
- Thaumatomyia notata (Meigen, 1830)

= Thaumatomyia notata =

Species of fly

Thaumatomyia notata, the yellow swarming fly, is a species of 'frit flies' or 'grass flies' belonging to the family Chloropidae subfamily Chloropinae.

This species is present in most of Europe, in the Afrotropical realm, in the Near East, in North Africa, and in the Indomalayan realm.

The adults grow up to 3 millimetres (0.12 in) long. The thorax and the eyes margins are bright yellow, mesonotum shows brown longitudinal bands and yellow stripes, the abdomen is yellow with large horizontal brown stripes.

They start flying in late March or in the first half of April and can be encountered feeding on nectar of flowers and various sweet liquids and excretions. They overwinter hibernating as adults, after at least two generations in a year.

In Europe in some localities from late Summer through December this species shows an aggregation behaviour, forming big swarms appearing as clouds or smoke, that invade buildings and parks.

Larvae usually live in roots of grasses. They are carnivorous, mainly preying on 'root aphids' ('Sugar-beet root aphids' Pemphigus fuscicornis, 'Lettuce root aphids' Pemphigus bursarius, etc.).

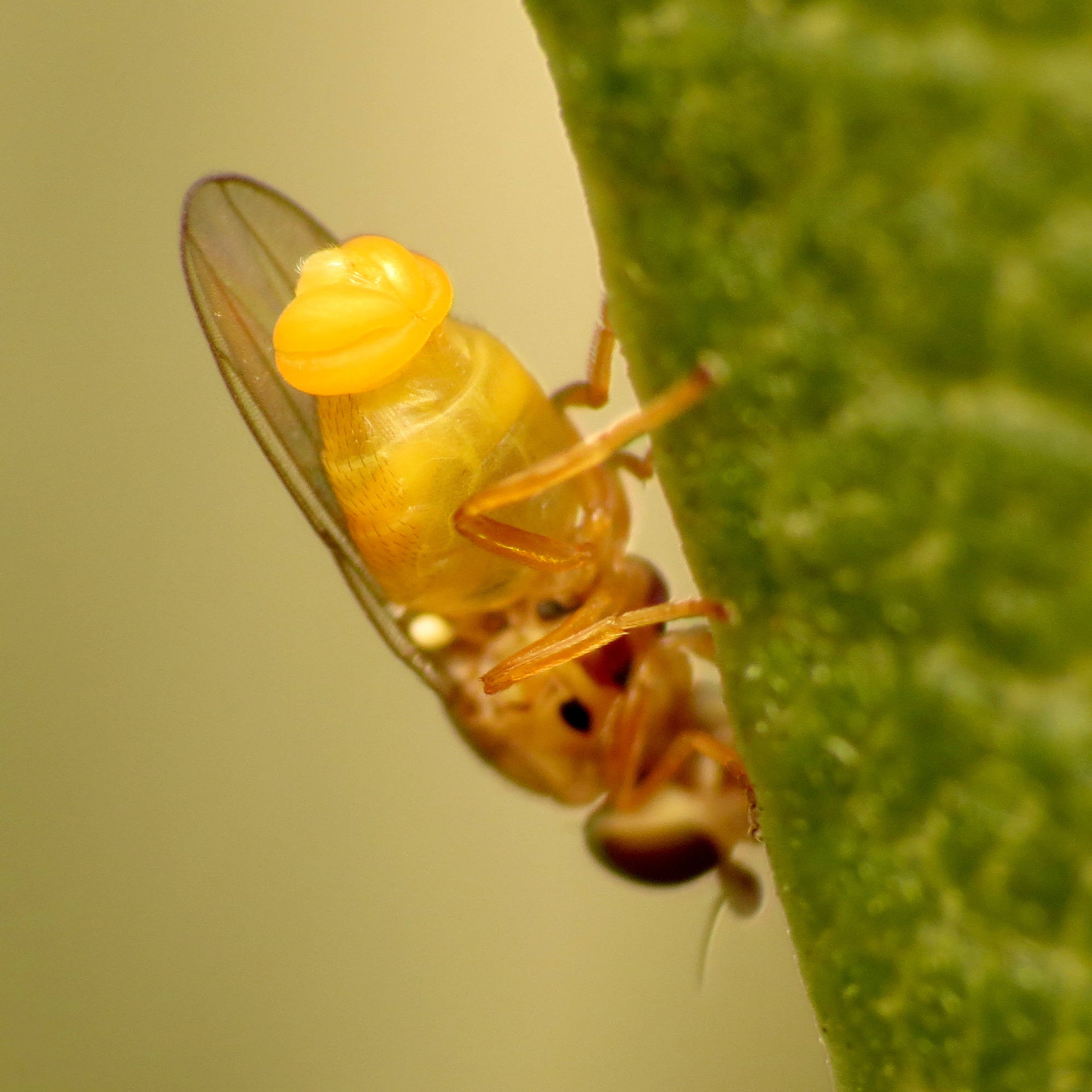
Thaumatomyia notata male with eversible vesicles that may be pheromone producing glands

Thaumatomyia notata male fanning its wings to disperse pheromones from abdominal sacs

Thaumatomyia notata female grooming its wings
