= Ctenophora nubecula =

Scientific classification
- Kingdom: Animalia
- Phylum: Arthropoda
- Class: Insecta
- Order: Diptera
- Family: Tipulidae
- Genus: Ctenophora
- Species: C. nubecula

Binomial name
- Ctenophora nubecula Osten Sacken, 1864

Species of fly

Ctenophora nubecula is a species of large crane fly in the family Tipulidae.
