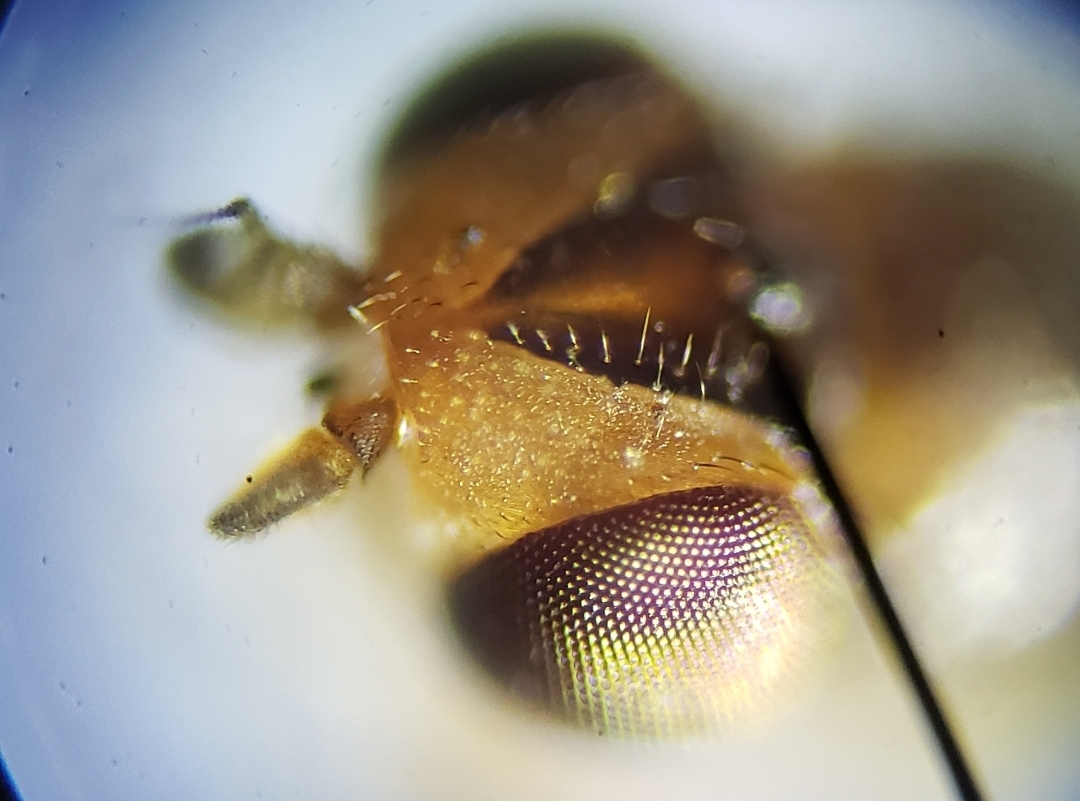
- Thaumatomyia pulla

Scientific classification
- Domain: Eukaryota
- Kingdom: Animalia
- Phylum: Arthropoda
- Class: Insecta
- Order: Diptera
- Family: Chloropidae
- Genus: Thaumatomyia
- Species: T. pulla

Binomial name
- Thaumatomyia pulla (Adams, 1904)

Synonyms
- Chloropisca monticola Becker, 1912; Chlorops pulla Adams, 1904

= Thaumatomyia pulla =

Species of fly

Thaumatomyia pulla is a species of grass fly in the family Chloropidae.
