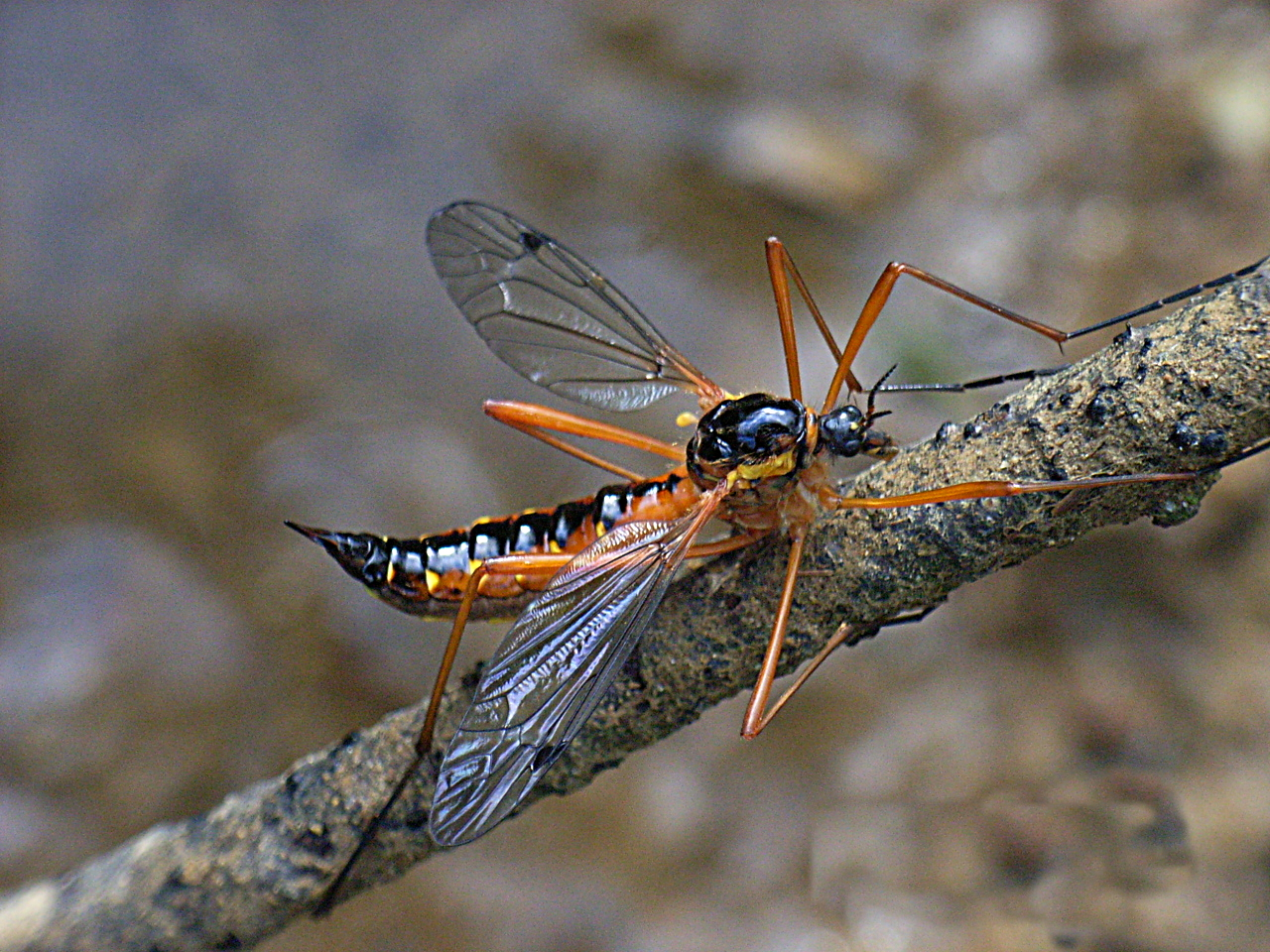
- Ctenophora pectinicornis female
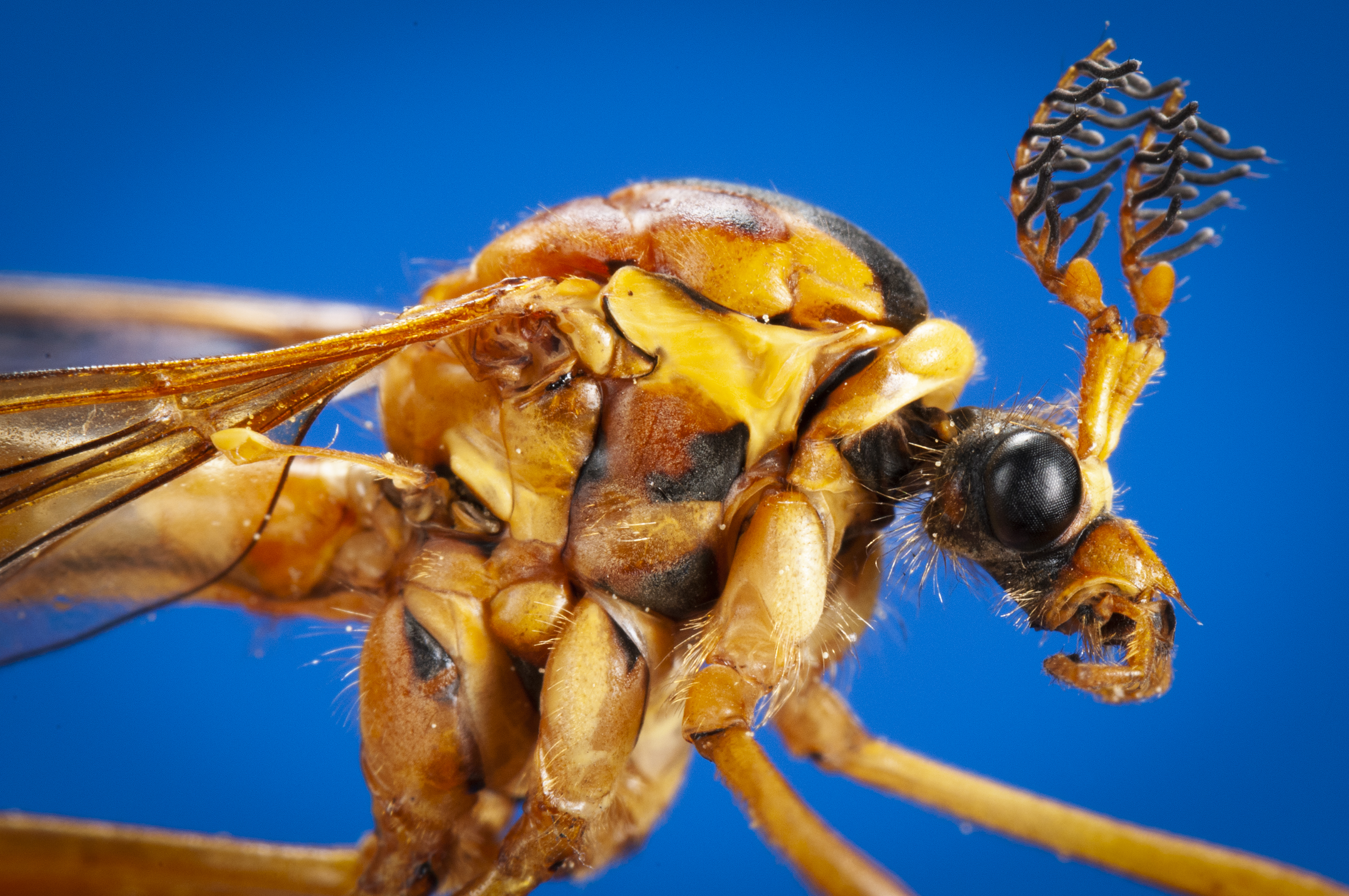
- Ctenophora (Cnemoncosis) yezoana, Adult, Korea

Scientific classification
- Kingdom: Animalia
- Phylum: Arthropoda
- Clade: Pancrustacea
- Class: Insecta
- Order: Diptera
- Family: Tipulidae
- Subfamily: Ctenophorinae
- Genus: Ctenophora; Meigen, 1804

Type species
- C. pectinicornis Linnaeus, 1758

Subgenera
- Cnemoncosis Enderlein, 1921; Ctenophora Meigen, 1803; Xiphuromorpha Savchenko, 1973

= Ctenophora (fly) =

Genus of flies

Ctenophora is a genus of true crane flies. The species are large (about 20 millimetres (0.79 in) long, with wingspans of 25 millimetres (0.98 in)), shiny black craneflies with large yellow, orange, or red markings to mimic wasps. Males have comb-like antennae. The larvae are saproxylic. The species are confined to old deciduous forests, orchards, and other habitats with continuity of the presence of dying and fallen trees. Ctenophora species are important bioindicators.

Ctenophora is distinguished from related genera (Dictenidia Brulle, Phoroctenia Coquillett) by these characteristic combinations. The segments of the antennae of the males have two pairs of outgrowths, the lower pair longer than upper pair. The antennae of the female are distinctly 13-segmented, and often indistinctly serrated. The sides of the mesothorax bear long bristles. Sternite 8 of the female is without dentate protuberances.

== Species ==
- Subgenus Cnemoncosis Enderlein, 1921
  - C. fastuosa Loew, 1871
  - C. festiva Meigen, 1804
  - C. ishiharai Alexander, 1953
  - C. magnifica Loew, 1869
  - C. nohirae Matsumura, 1916
  - C. ornata Meigen, 1818
  - C. septentrionalis (Alexander, 1921)
  - C. yezoana Matsumura, 1906
- Subgenus Ctenophora Meigen, 1803
  - C. amabilis Takahashi, 1960
  - C. apicata Osten Sacken, 1864
  - C. biguttata Matsumura, 1916
  - C. elegans Meigen, 1818
  - C. flaveolata (Fabricius, 1794)
  - C. guttata Meigen, 1818
  - C. nigriceps (Tjeder, 1949)
  - C. nikkoensis Takahashi, 1960
  - C. nubecula Osten Sacken, 1864
  - C. pectinicornis (Linnaeus, 1758)
  - C. perjocosa Alexander, 1940
  - C. pselliophoroides Alexander, 1938
  - C. tricolor Loew, 1869
- Subgenus Xiphuromorpha Savchenko, 1973
  - C. sibirica Portschinsky, 1873
