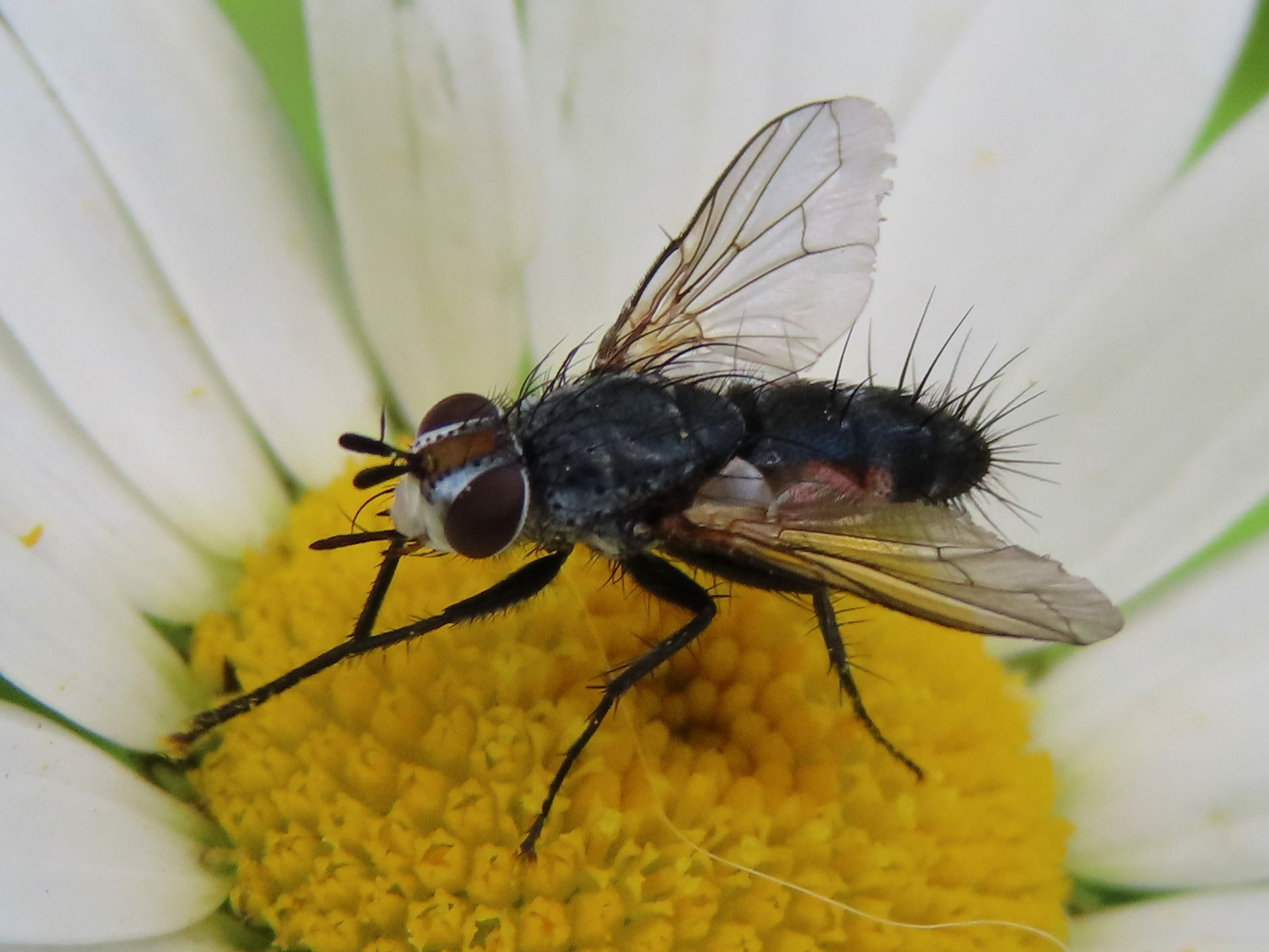

Scientific classification
- Kingdom: Animalia
- Phylum: Arthropoda
- Class: Insecta
- Order: Diptera
- Family: Tachinidae
- Tribe: Leskiini
- Genus: Aphria
- Species: A. ocypterata

Binomial name
- Aphria ocypterata Townsend, 1891

Synonyms
- Aphria occidentale Townsend, 1891

= Aphria ocypterata =

Species of fly

Aphria ocypterata is a species of bristle fly in the family Tachinidae. It is found in North America.
