= Wilhelm von Winthem =

Wilhelm von Winthem (1799–1847) was a naturalist and entomologist from Hamburg, Germany, who was chiefly interested in Diptera and Hymenoptera. Well placed in a port city, von Winthem built a world collection.

Winthem belonged to a long-established family of Hamburg merchants. A successful merchant himself he became very wealthy. He purchased huge numbers of insects, concentrating on Diptera, Hymenoptera and Hemiptera. Johann Wilhelm Meigen worked on his European Diptera and he purchased the collection of Christian Rudolph Wilhelm Wiedemann (who had borrowed specimens from him including flies from Brazil), and many others. Thus he built the most important Diptera collection of the age.

For almost all the Diptera described in the present paper we are indebted to Wilhelm von Winthem of Hamburg, a young man who is collecting native and exotic insects with unusual enthusiasm and who has already made many welcome discoveries.

— Wiedemann, 1819, Brasilianische Zweiflügler, Zoologisches Magazin (Kiel), 1(3):40-56

In 1852 his collection was sold to the Imperial Museum in Vienna. Kept separately until at least 1880 it was finally incorporated into the main Diptera collections of the Naturhistorisches Museum. Von Winthem's specimens are identified with a printed label "coll. Winthem", usually with the species name added and, appropriately, with Wiedemann's or Meigen's handwritten labels.
