= Musée d'Histoire Naturelle de Lille =

Museum in Lille, France

Coordinates: 50°37′36″N 3°4′0″E

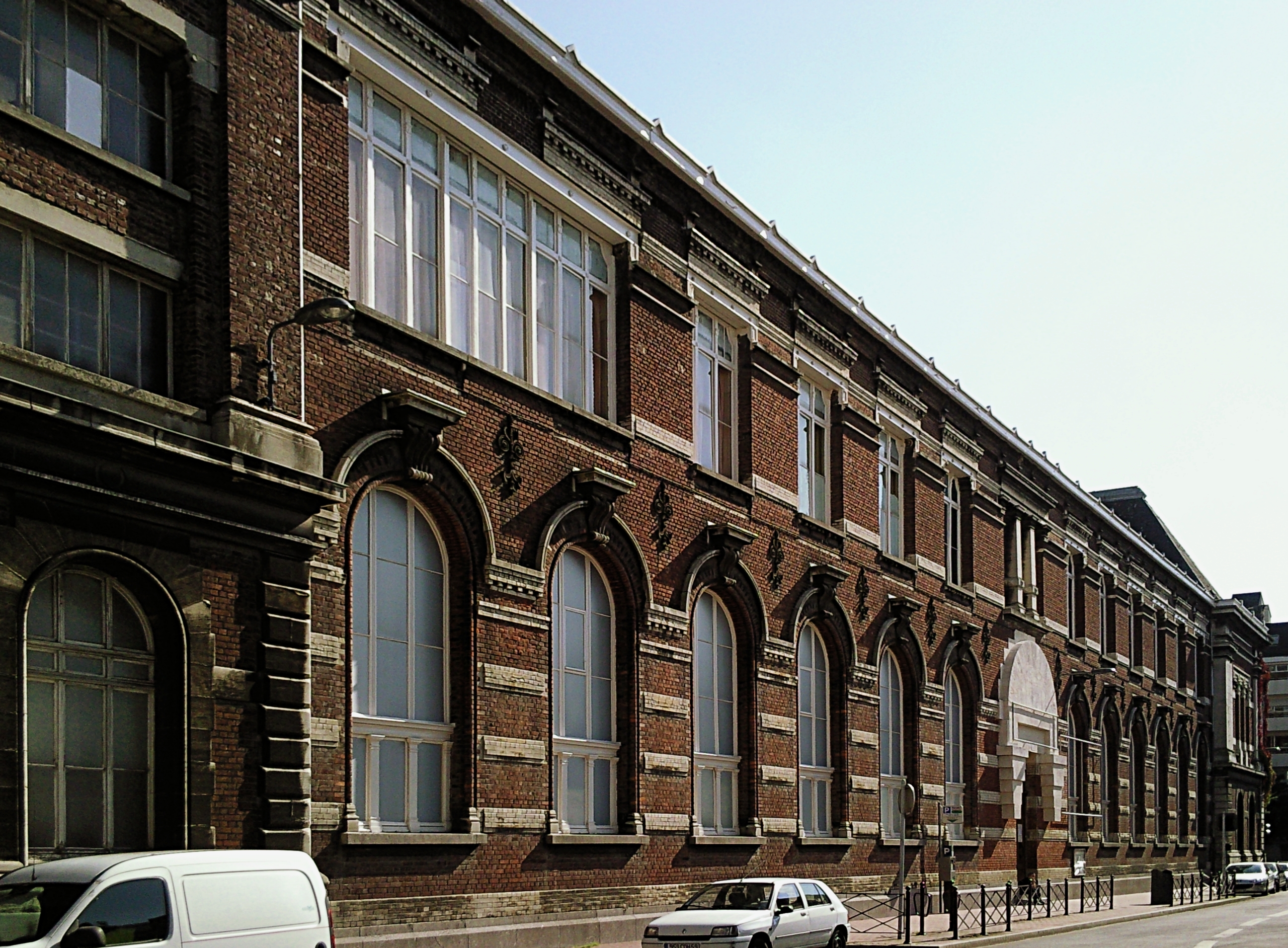
Musée d'Histoire Naturelle de Lille.

The Musée d'Histoire Naturelle de Lille, or Lille Natural History Museum, was founded in 1822. It houses zoological and geological collections. Its holdings have recently been enhanced by ethnographic specimens from the Musée Moillet and industrial objects from the old Musée Industriel et Commercial de Lille. The museum's address is 19 Rue de Bruxelles.

== Brazilian artifacts controversy ==
In 2003, a large exhibit of Brazilian artifacts was planned in the city of Lille as part of the Celebrations of the Year of Brazil in France, that would take place in 2005. 611 objects were to be displayed in France, but the Brazilian government was uneasy to allow them to be removed from the country. As a solution, the Lille Natural History Museum bought the objects, immediately donating them to the Museu do Índio, in Rio de Janeiro, and thus securing the right to loan the objects for five years, renewable for another five years. In 2009, having received no notice that the French museum intended to renew the loan, the Museu do Indio asked for their restitution, which was refused, with museum representatives saying that the objects were now part of the heritage of the city of Lille.

After a legal battle that lasted more than a decade, the objects were set to be returned in 2023, with the Brazilian government agreeing to pay for the transportation costs.

Historian Juarez da Silva has criticised the Museum, saying that they are holding to "ideas that such objects cannot be preserved and valued in their own countries" and that the cultural heritage of countries deemed as "exotic" is still very much seen as "up for grabs".

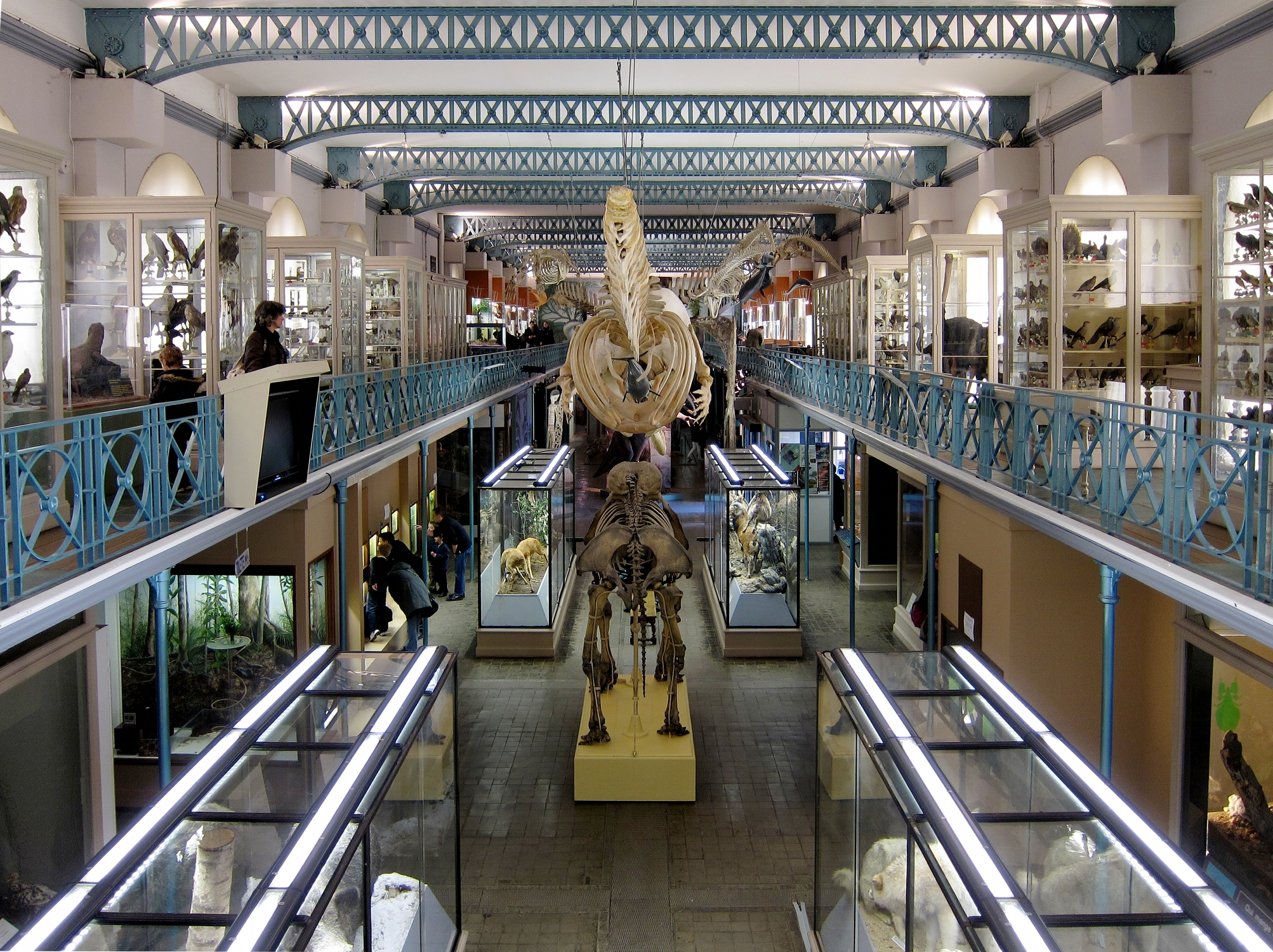
Interior
