= Christian Rudolph Wilhelm Wiedemann =

German entomologist (1770–1840)

- Born: 7 December 1770; Braunschweig, Brunswick-Wolfenbuttel
- Died: 31 December 1840 (aged 70); Kiel, Holstein
- Education: University of Jena
- Scientific career
- Fields: Physics; History; Natural history Entomology
- Workplaces: Braunschweig University of Technology

Christian Rudolph Wilhelm Wiedemann (7 December 1770 – 31 December 1840) was a German medical doctor, historian, naturalist and entomologist. He is best known for his studies of world Diptera, but he also studied Hymenoptera and Coleoptera, although far less expertly.

== Biography ==
Wiedemann's father, Conrad Eberhard Wiedemann (1722–1804) was an art dealer and his mother, Dorothea Frederike (née Raspe) (1741–1804) was the daughter of an accountant in the Royal Mining Service and also interested in the arts.

After his education in Brunswick, he matriculated in 1790 to the Faculty of Medicine at the University of Jena where he was a contemporary of the poet Friedrich von Hardenberg.

While attending university, Wiedemann, was one of the many pupils of Johann Friedrich Blumenbach, and travelled to Saxony and Bohemia. He obtained his doctoral degree in 1792 with a thesis entitled Dissertatio inauguralis sistens vitia gennus humanum debilitantia. He then went to England to increase his knowledge of mineralogy.

Appointed Professor of Anatomy at Brunswick's Collegium Carolinum in 1794, his inaugural address was about a medical condition observed in a boy at Llandeilo, Wales. It was titled Über das fehlende Brustbein, English "On the missing breastbone".

In 1796, he married Luise Michaelis, the daughter of Johann David Michaelis, an Orientalist. They would raise the two sons of Luise's brother, who died in a cholera epidemic. The couple had nine children of their own, two dying in infancy.

He was later appointed Lecturer in his specialist field obstetrics

In the late 17th century, there was a movement, based in Brunswick, to establish German as a scientific language. Able to read Latin, English, French and Italian, Wiedemann found remunerative work as a translator.

In 1801, he received a scholarship for study in Paris from the Duke of Brunswick. Here he studied obstetrics and natural history and met Georges Cuvier, amongst other zoologists.

In 1802, he was, in addition to his other medical appointments, made Professor of Obstetrics at the College of Anatomy and Surgery and was nominated Privy Councillor at the court of the Duchy of Brunswick and Lüneburg.

In 1804, he contracted syphilis which had serious effects in later years.

In 1805, he became Professor of Medicine in Kiel (then in Denmark and part of the Duchy of Holstein) with the title Counsellor of Justice and, later Counsellor of State. These were difficult years for Denmark which had sided with France in the Napoleonic Wars against England (and her allies) to preserve her maritime empire. Money was a problem and Wiedemann used his own resources to set up the midwifery clinic proposed as one of his duties as professor.

In 1811, he travelled south to Italy for his health.

From around 1814, Wiedemann devoted much of his time to taxonomic entomology and in 1815, on a visit to Bonn to stay with his daughter Emma who had married Carl Theodor Welcker later a radical embroiled in the turbulent politics of the 1840s he travelled to Stolberg to meet Johann Wilhelm Meigen a, by then, well known entomologist through his important work on Diptera. Perhaps, not able to attend properly to his medical duties through ill health- he visited the spa town of Bad Aachen in 1817. Wiedemann changed employment (to Pharmacology) and had several semi-honorary positions. With more time and sedentary, he prepared and studied insects and went on collecting trips for his health. He also gave lectures on entomology and natural history.

Wiedemann's most productive work on insects was accomplished in the 1820s. But when he attended a scientific meeting in Hamburg in 1830 this too was drawing to a close. His eyesight was very poor and he had a succession of strokes.

Wiedemann main natural history interest remained entomology but he was also interested in mineralogy and conchology. In 1827, his collections included 5,000 minerals and over 3,500 species of Diptera.

He is known to have visited Hamburg, Copenhagen and Berlin in these years but nothing is so far known of these trips although they may well have been to further his insect studies.

== Achievements ==
Wiedemann published the first monographs on “exotic” (non-European) Diptera. He was the creator of the transitory review Archiv für Zoologie und Zootomie 1800-1806 (five volumes) 2,356 pages. Berlin and Brunswick and the Zoologisches Magazin (volumes 1-2) 1817-1823 749 pages. Kiel and Altona.

Although he worked mainly on Diptera he also published descriptions of Coleoptera and (at least one) Hymenopteran.

He was the successor to Johan Christian Fabricius as the author of descriptions of "exotic" that is non-European Diptera. Meigen worked only on the European species.

His descriptions show clear advances, both over Fabricius and many of his contemporaries. A brief Latin diagnosis, a fuller detailed description in German, the sex of the specimen, locality details, a reference to the collection in which the specimen was to be found and, sometimes, the name of the collector.

In Brunswick, then an important centre for entomology Wiedemann worked with Johann Christian Ludwig Hellwig and Johann Karl Wilhelm Illiger setting new standards for descriptions (uniform terminology for structures and colour) and for nomenclature, especially in regard to the avoidance of synonyms by proper research of pre-existing literature. He was critical of Fabricius in this respect, although honouring him as a great entomologist.

In Aussereuropäische Zweiflügelige Insekten he described 1000 new and redescribed 500 old (mainly Fabrician) species. This work, supplemental to Meigen followed Meigen in introducing many new genera. He could have gone further than he did with "exotic" genera. He introduced too few of these but the full extent of diversity of world Diptera was not then apparent. The work includes descriptions of Diptera collected by Ferdinand Deppe in Mexico.

Wiedemann, in his studies of the Fabrician) species was careful to consider only Fabricius specimens identified by their labels in Fabricius' hand. This is at the core of the modern concept of type specimens.

He made his studies as comprehensive as possible, studying the collections of Wilhelm Von Winthem and Bernt Wilhelm Westermann and studied the collections in Copenhagen, Berlin, Frankfurt, Kiel, Leiden and Vienna. He also studied Thomas Say's borrowing these from the Philadelphia museum. He was unable to study the Linnean and the Fabricius types (both in London) or visit Paris.

Wiedemann's published work on entomology was almost entirely descriptive and notable for its accuracy.

== Works ==
- Georges Cuvier, 1798 Tableau Élémentaire as Cüviers elemantarischer Entwurf der Naturgeschichte der Thiere, aus dem Französischen übersetz ind mit Anmmerkungen versehen von C.R.W. Wiedemann. Brunswick, 1800. The entomological part of this was translated and revised by Johann Karl Wilhelm Illiger.Translation.
- Über Pariser Gebäranstalten und Geburtshelfer, den letzen Schamfugenschnitt und einige andere zu Paris beobachtete Geburtsfälle. Brunswick 1803. Medical.
- Unterricht für Hebammen. Brunswick, 1802. Medical – A Manual for Midwives. A Danish edition, Undervissung for Giordemødre was published in 1805. Expanded it was published as Lesebuch für Hebammen, Primer for midwives in 1814.
- Anweisung zur Rettung der Ertrunkenen, Ersticken, Ehrängten, vom Blitze Erschlagenen, Erfrornen und Vergiftaten; nach den neuesten Beobachtungen entworfen. Brunswick, 1796 (Second edition 1804). Medical- treatment of accident victims.
- With Karl Gustav Himly and T. G. A. Roose- Über das Impfen der Kuhpocken für besorgte Mütter. Brunswick, 1800. Medical. Advice on Smallpox vaccination.
- J. Stuve Lehrbuch der Kenntniss des menschlichen Körpers und der Gesundheitslehren. Brunswick, 1805. Medical. Second revised edition of a standard textbook.
- B. Harwood's System der vergleichenden Anatomie ud Physiologie. Aus dem Englischen übersetzt und mit Anmerkungen und Zusätzen versehen von C.R.W. Wiedemann.Berlin, 1790.Translation.
- J. Méhée. Über die Schusswunden. Brunswick, 1801).Translation.
- Antoine-François de Fourcroy System der chemischen Kenntnisse. 1801.Translation.
- Handbuch der Anatomie English Handbook of Anatomy.1796 (second editions 1802 and 1812)
- Übersicht der mineralogischen einfachen fossilien.1800.
- Tabulae animalium invertebratorum. 1810
- Diptera exotica: sectio I. Kiliae: [s.n.], 1820.
- Munus rectoris in Academia Christiana Albertina aditurus Analecta entomologica ex Museo Regio Havniensi... Kilisae: el regio typographeo scholarum, 1824.
- Aussereuropäische Zweiflügelige Insekten. Hamm 1828-1830

== Collections ==
Wiedemann's collection of Diptera and Hymenoptera was taken over by Wilhelm von Winthem who presented part to the Natural History Museum, Vienna (Naturhistorisches Museum, Wien) the rest to the Senckenberg Museum in Frankfurt, The Zoological Museum, University of Copenhagen (Zoologisk Museum, Københavns Universitet).

== Honors ==
The Wiedemann Range in Greenland was named after him.
