= Johann Wilhelm Meigen =

German entomologist

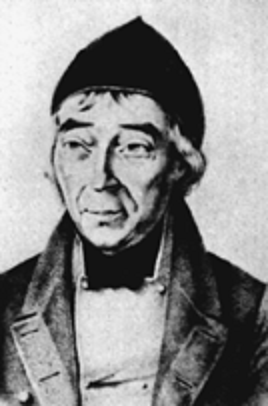
- Born: 3 May 1764; Solingen, North Rhine-Westphalia, Germany
- Died: 11 July 1845 (aged 81); Stolberg, North Rhine-Westphalia, Germany
- Known for: Pioneering work in dipterology
- Spouse: Anna Meigen
- Children: ≥7
- Parents: Johann Clemens Meigen (father); Sibylla Margaretha Bick (mother)
- Scientific career
- Author abbrev. (zoology): Meigen

Johann Wilhelm Meigen (3 May 1764 – 11 July 1845) was a German entomologist famous for his pioneering work on Diptera.

== Life ==
=== Early years ===
Meigen was born in Solingen, the fifth of eight children of Johann Clemens Meigen and Sibylla Margaretha Bick. His parents, though not poor, were not wealthy either. They ran a small shop in Solingen. His paternal grandparents, however, owned an estate and hamlet with twenty houses. Adding to the rental income, Meigen's grandfather was a farmer and a guild mastercutler in Solingen.

Two years after Meigen was born, his grandparents died and his parents moved to the family estate. This was already heavily indebted due to the Seven Years' War when bad crops and rash speculations forced the sale of the farm and the family moved back to Solingen.

Meigen attended the town school but only for a short time. He had learned to read and write on his grandfather's estate and he read widely at home as well as taking an interest in natural history. A lodger in the household, a state surveyor named Stamm, gave Meigen instruction in mathematics. Another family friend, a Reformed Church organist and teacher called Berger, gave him lessons from his 10th year on piano, orthography, and calligraphy. Later on, in 1776, he also taught him French.

Meigen became Berger's assistant, going to Mülheim with him. There he saw for the first time a systematic collection of butterflies, and here he also learned how to collect and prepare insects.

In the autumn of 1779 he returned to Solingen to help his parents, at first by giving private lessons in French, but in the following year he started a French school that lasted until early in 1784. During his few free hours in this period he studied history from Charles Rollin's 15-volume Roman History and that author's four-volume Ancient History (both in French). The only entomological work in his possession at this time was Moder's (or Kleemann's) Caterpillar Calendar.

Later in 1784 he was recommended to Pelzer, a tradesman in Aachen, for the position of resident tutor. On taking up the post, he was treated as a family member. Pelzer had a cousin in Aachen by the name of Mathias Baumhauer (1759–1818), a wool merchant's son, who was a very able entomologist. Baumhauer had a butterfly collection including about 1200 species as well as numbers of insects of all other orders.

=== Early entomology ===
Meigen's first attempts to identify his collection, which was mainly of Diptera, were made using a two-volume work by Philipp Ludwig Statius Muller, a German translation of Linnaeus's Natursystem published in the Netherlands by Houttyn. He soon made his first discovery; the Linnean genera were too inclusive and a better classification could be arrived at using wing venation. This conclusion had already occurred to both Moses Harris in England and Louis Jurine in Geneva, but at the time Meigen was unaware of this. Sensing an important step forward, he secured the works of Fabricius and from that time concentrated on Diptera.

He soon found that wing venation alone was not enough to classify the Diptera correctly and he began to make drawings of the antennae viewed under a 20-power wooden-framed microscope purchased at the fair in Aachen. Using this, a lens of about 6-power, and his own very sharp eyesight and visual memory, Meigen arrived at his next important conclusion; that the Diptera could only be classified using character combinations. This is now known as an eclectic system.

=== Return to Solingen ===
In 1786, the Solingen organist, a younger brother of his former teacher, Berger, died in Solingen. That position, with a French school connected with it, was offered to Meigen and he went back to Solingen.

There he became closely acquainted with a man called Weniger, who shared his interests in botany and entomology. His enthusiasm for entomology and botany became broader and he decided to extend his studies to species from around the world. Weniger felt likewise and they contacted the banker and collector Johann Christian Gerning in Frankfurt. Gerning wrote to his son in the Netherlands, who bought insect specimens for him. A Swiss, Count von Meuron, who was in the Dutch service and whose brother was governor of Trincomalee on Ceylon, heard of their wishes and obtained for them the offer of positions as surgeons on an East Indiaman, with an additional stipend. This plan was given up when Meigen's mother opposed it.

=== To Burtscheid ===
In 1792, Meigen took instruction in drawing. Then he was offered a teaching position in Burtscheid near Aachen. However, he could not leave Solingen because it was occupied by the French army during the Battle of Jemappes. Only when the French withdrew after the Battle of Neerwinden was he able to leave for Burtscheid and Aachen, where he then taught as well as collecting assiduously.

In 1796, Meigen took a job teaching French in Stolberg, two hours from Aachen. Here he remained without further change of residence until his death. In Stolberg outside of school hours he taught drawing, geography, history and piano. He also met a brass-worker named J. A. Peltzer, who was a mathematician and owned a 60-power Tiedemann achromatic telescope. Soon Meigen was teaching astronomy as well.

In 1801, Meigen met the French naturalist Count Lacépède who had come to Stolberg to visit the brass works. They talked about natural history and Meigen showed Count Lacépède his drawings of Diptera. The following day Meigen was asked to visit Count Lacépède, who asked him to join Capt. Baudin's voyage around the world as a botanist. Meigen declined.

In 1802, Johann Karl Wilhelm Illiger, who must have heard of Meigen from Count Lacépède, and was at the baths in Aachen with Johann Centurius Hoffmannsegg, invited him to join them. Meigen took his drawings along and made arrangements with Illiger and Hoffmannsegg for future work. Illiger had captured a new and unknown dipteran and showed a pen drawing of it to Meigen, asking him how it should be classified. Meigen described it as Loxocera hoffmannseggi. Illiger also agreed to proofread Meigen's first work on Diptera which was then published in 1804 by Reichard in Braunschweig.

A selection of Meigen's colour paintings from Europäischen Zweiflügeligen, 1804

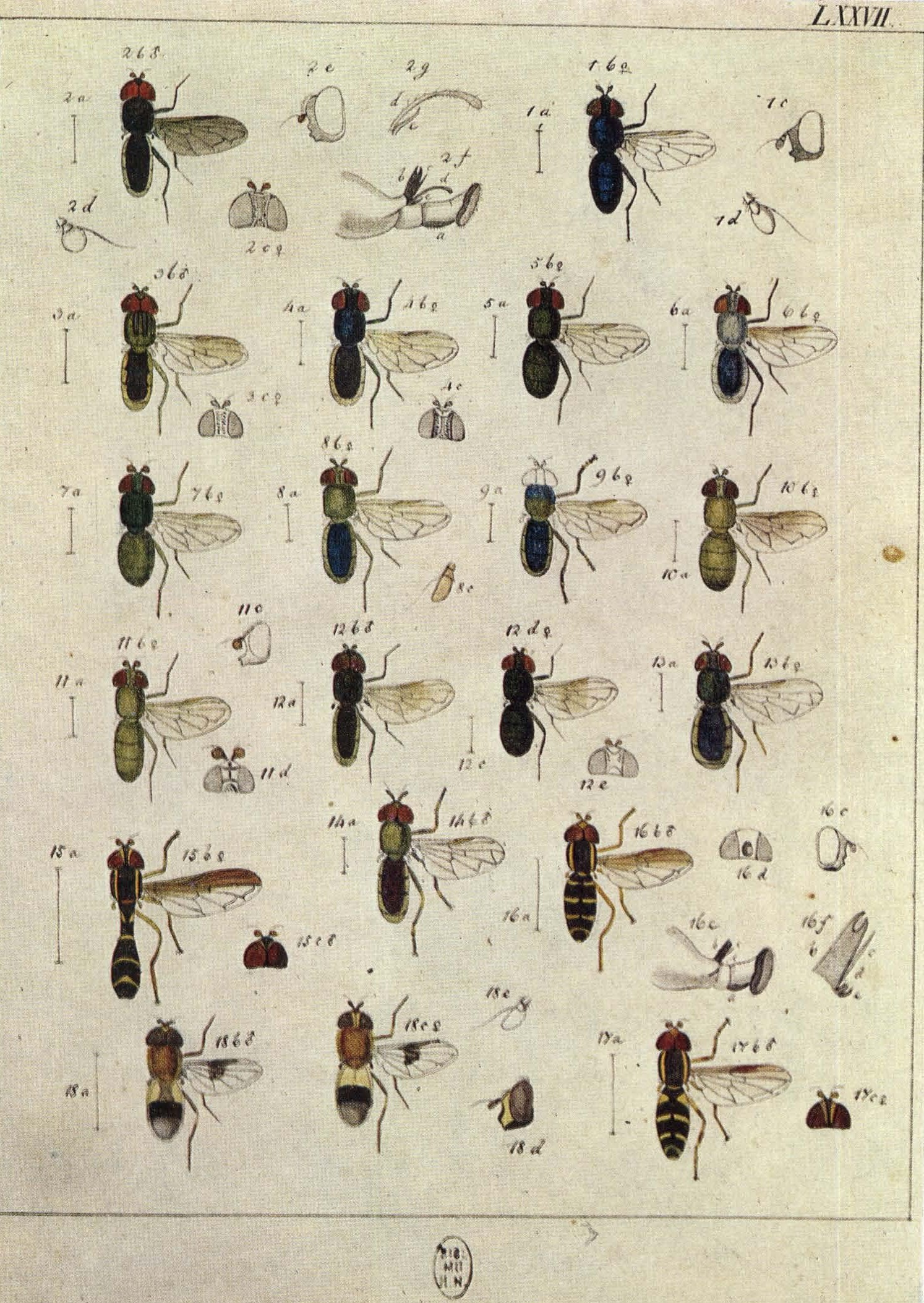
Plate 77
(Hoverflies)

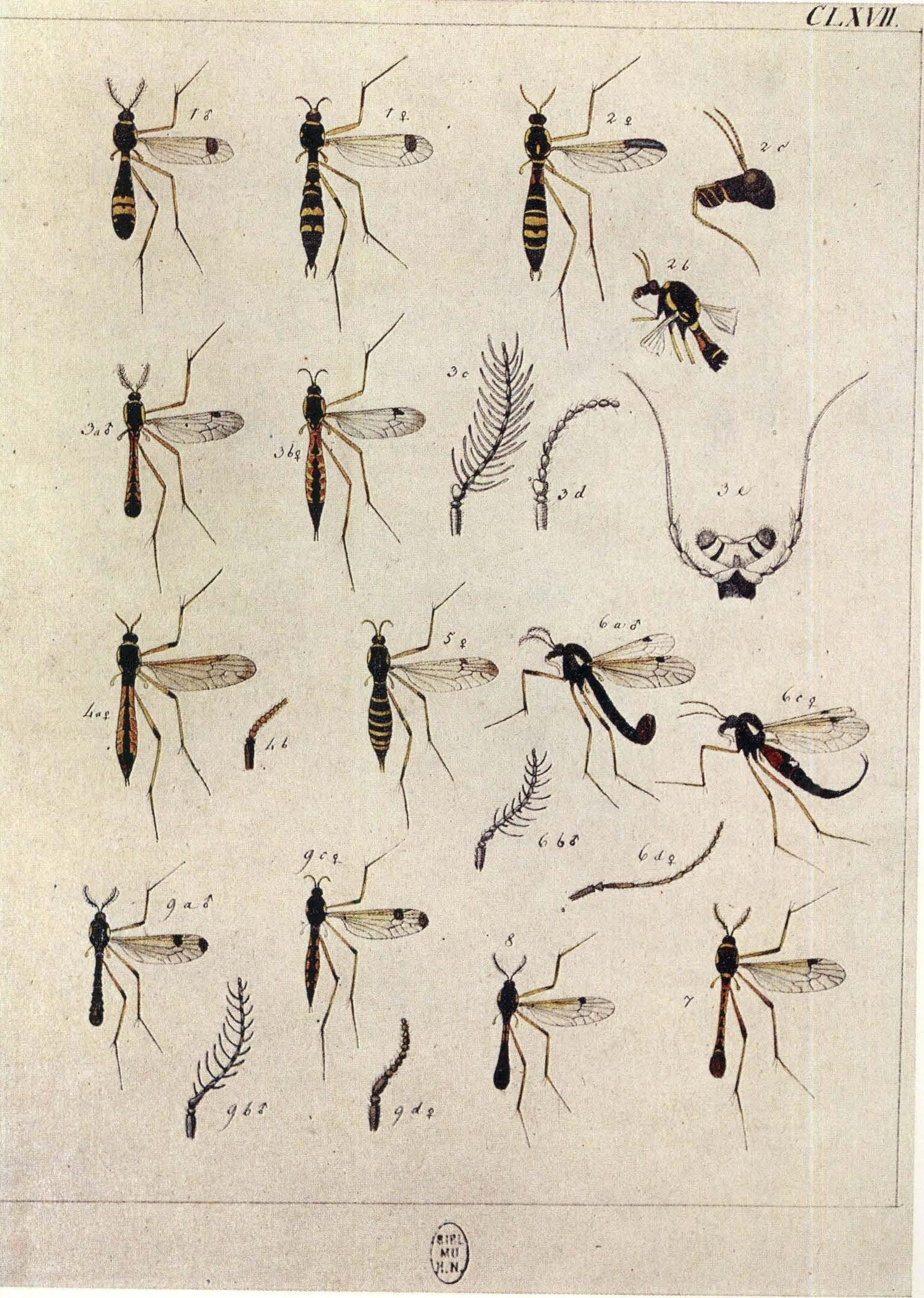
Plate 167
(Craneflies)

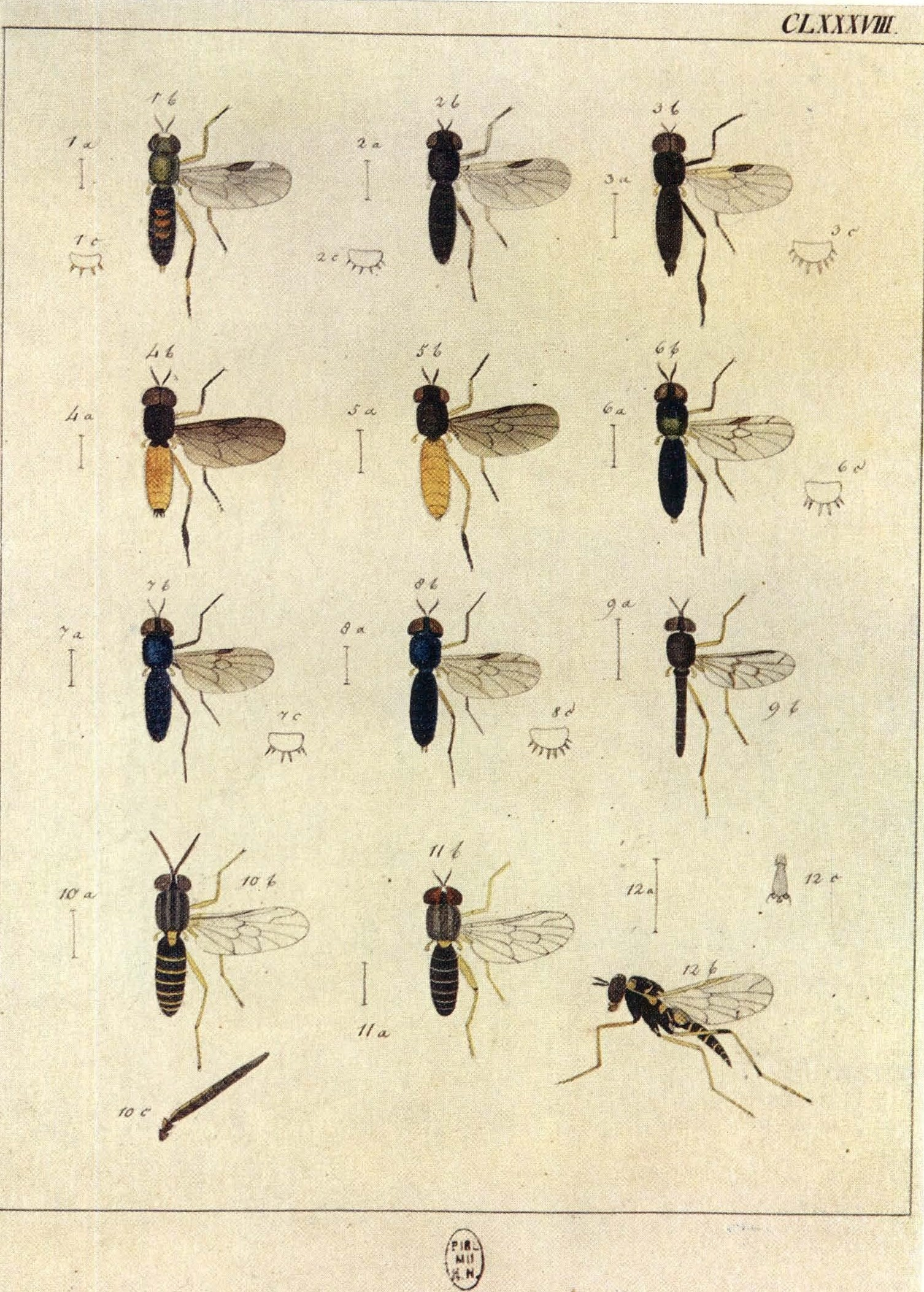
Plate 168
(False soldier flies)

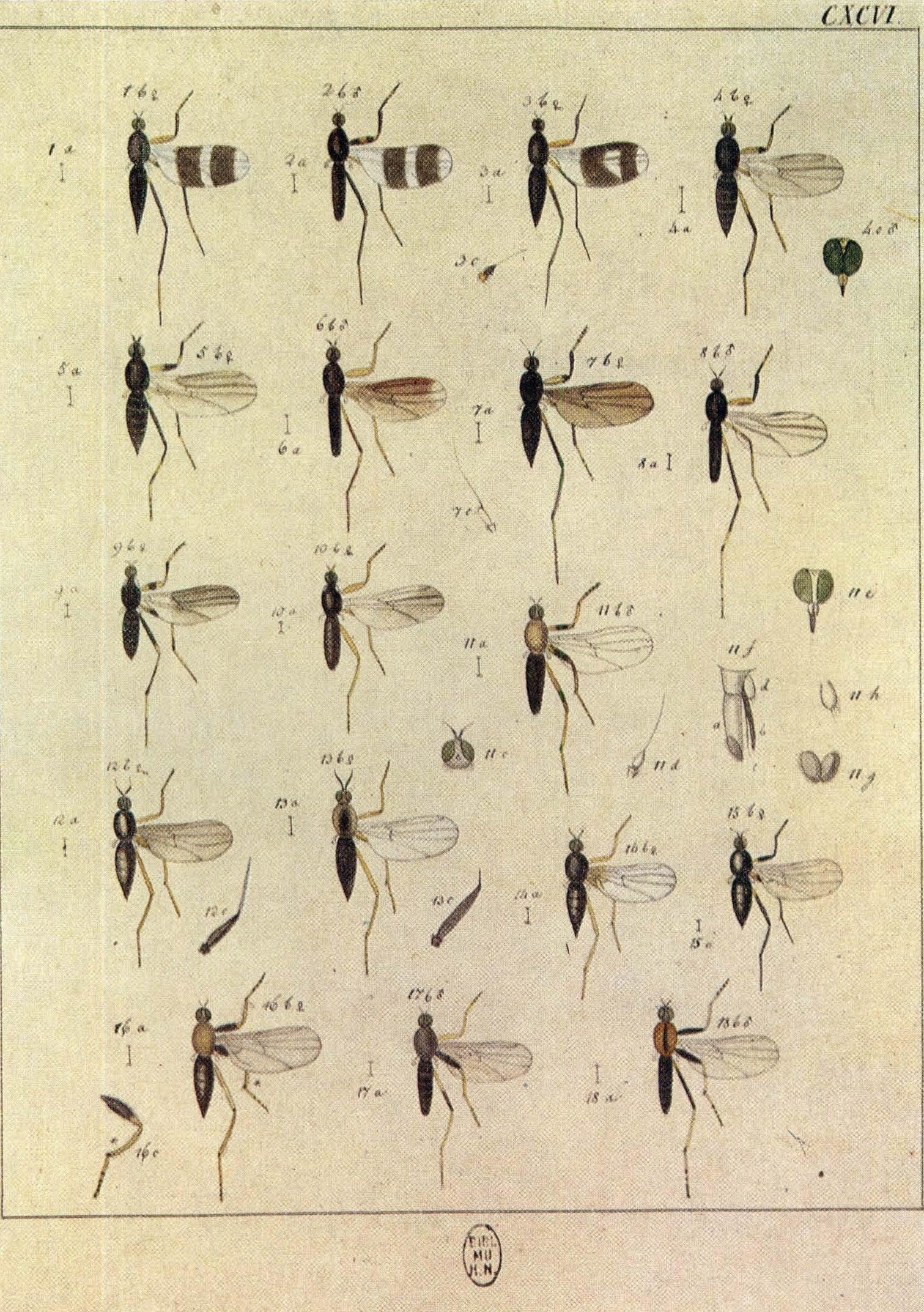
Plate 196
(Hybotid flies)

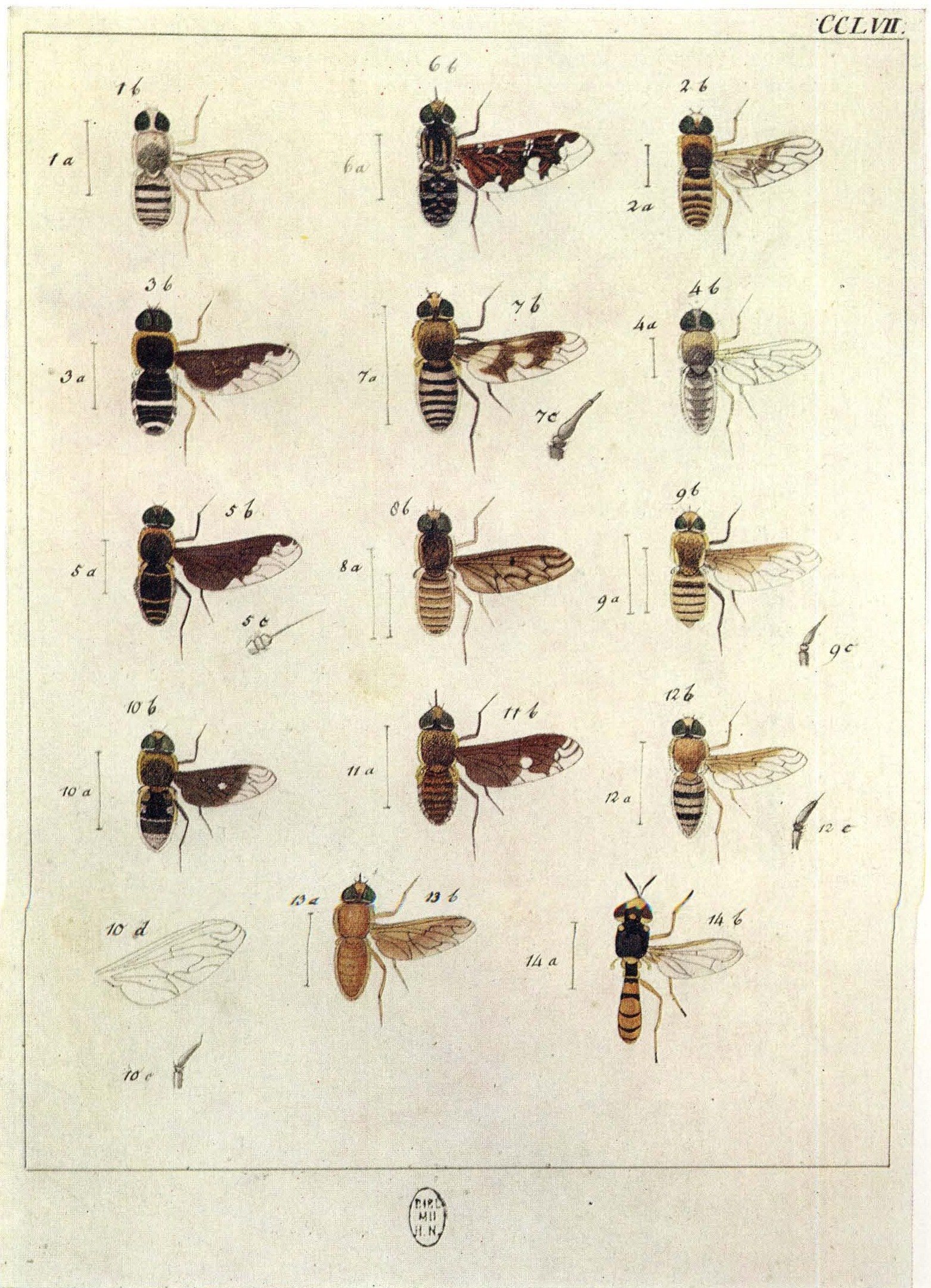
Plate 257
(Bee-flies)

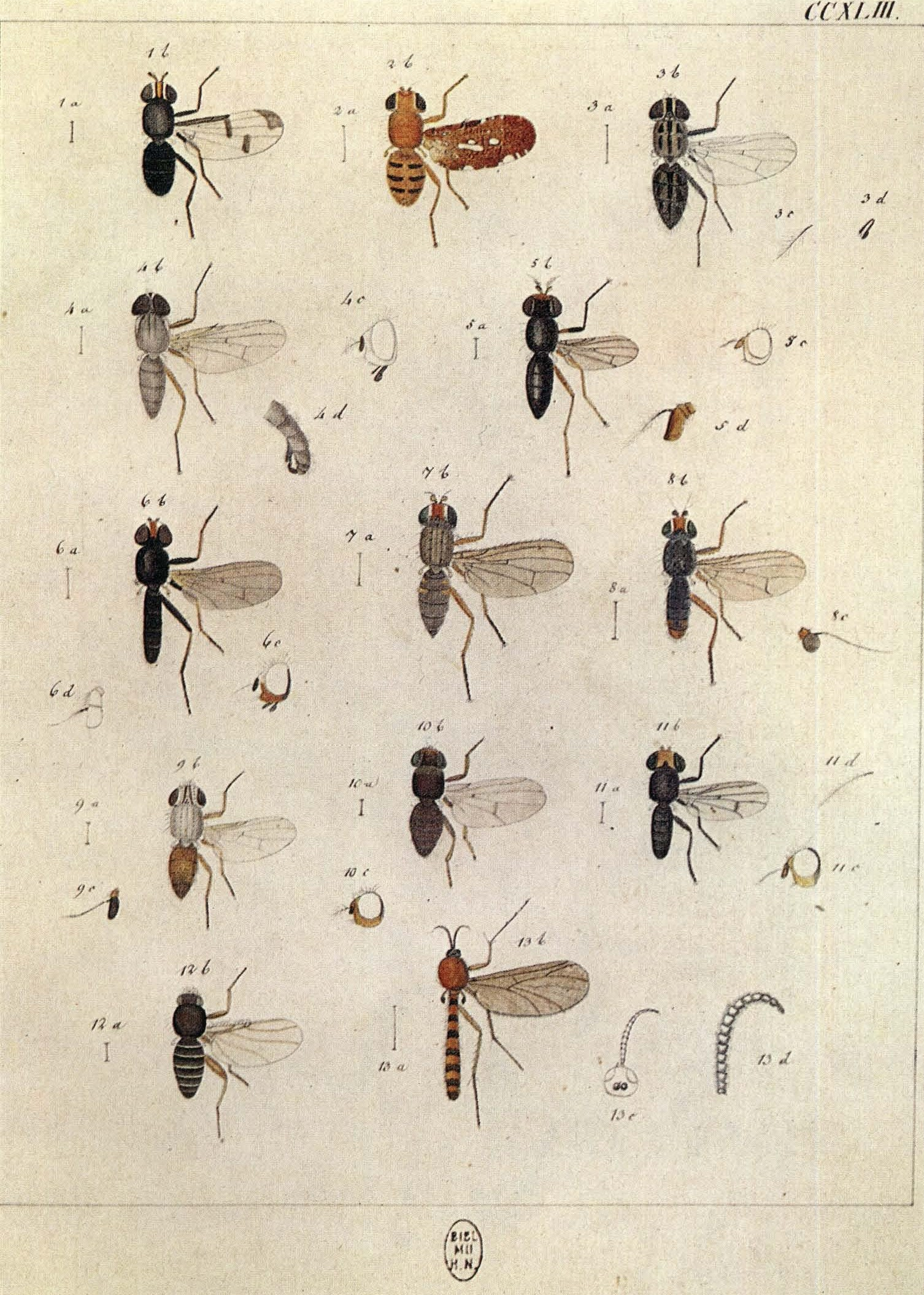
Plate 258
(Schizophora, etc)

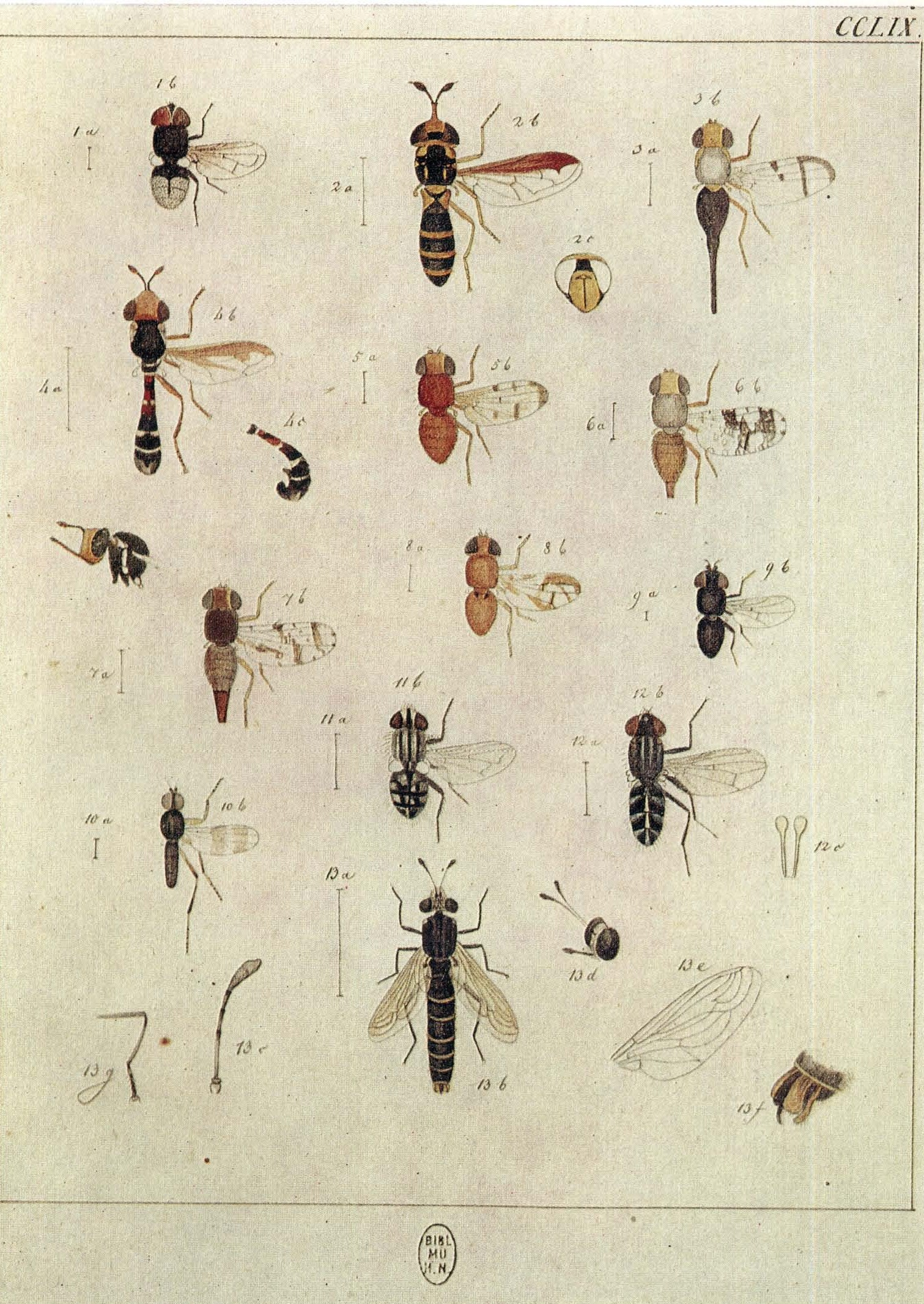
Plate 259
(Assorted flies)

=== Controversy ===
In 1804, the only classification of Diptera was that of Fabricius. Despite Meigen's more advanced, and more natural classification, Meigen's Die Fliegen found little favor with most entomologists, who were adherents of Fabricius, but that did not deflect Meigen.

In the same year, Fabricius visited Paris and saw Meigen's work. On returning home, he wrote Meigen and arranged to meet him in Aachen. A few days later Fabricius came to Stolberg. Here he was shown all of Meigen's new genera in order that he might use them in the projected new edition of Systema Antliatorum. Fabricius criticized Meigen for his eclectic method, asserting that a classification should be based upon one part of the body (mainly mouthparts), not on several different parts. Meigen pointed out that Fabricius himself did not consistently follow his own precepts, but even so, Fabricius refused to use the eclectic method.

=== Marriage ===
In 1801, Meigen married Anna, the sister of the Reverend Mänsse, a preacher at Hückelhoven near Linnich. Anna was clearly devoted to Meigen, which was as well since hard times were ahead. Until 1808 the number of students of French steadily declined, resulting of course in a considerable reduction in Meigen's income. In this crisis, a merchant in Stolberg, one Adolf Pelzer, obtained for him the secretaryship for the Stolberg commercial committee, including keeping minutes of meetings and carrying on correspondence in both German and French. Then, in another reversal, he was replaced by a voluntary secretariat.

=== Coal fossils ===
In 1812, the French government provided Meigen with the job of finishing drawings of coal fossils. At this time his work day began usually at about 4 in the morning and lasted until late in the evening for 314 days of each year. All free time was spent with the study of entomology; mostly Diptera, but also other orders. He also studied history and mathematics. At this time Meigen drew and colored many more species for Die Fliegen.

From 1812 to 1814 Meigen drew some maps for the municipality of Stolberg. He also corresponded again with Count von Hoffmannsegg, until the latter sold his collection to the Natural History Museum of Berlin.

=== Offer from Wiedemann ===
In 1815, Meigen received a letter from State Attorney (Justizrat) Christian Rudolph Wilhelm Wiedemann asking if there was any prospect that his work begun in 1804 could be continued. He offered access to the Fabricius collection in the University of Kiel. Then, in the summer of 1816, Wiedemann came to Stolberg and stayed eight days to outline an ambitious project. He had material sent to Meigen from the Vienna Museum, from the Hoffmannsegg collection in Berlin, and from the Peter Simon Pallas collection. Meigen worked constantly and in 1818 the first volume of the new and enlarged edition of Die Fliegen came out, followed by the others until the 7th volume appeared in 1838. For this last volume Meigen had to make the lithographic plates himself to cut expenses. He also prepared 19 lithographic plates for Wiedemann's Aussereuropaische Zweiflugler. The first volumes of Die Fliegen were published by Meigen himself, but the costs were high, in spite of a considerable list of subscriptions. The Schulz bookdealers in Hamm took over the job with a sizeable honorarium.

In 1818, Meigen's longtime friend and tireless collector, Baumhauer, died in Paris. His widow brought his collection to Aachen and got Meigen to identify it. He took on the identification of at least 50,000 specimens from Germany, France, the Pyrenees, the Alps and northern Italy, and worked on it for a year and a half. The collection was then sold for 1100 Dutch guilders, part of it going to Leiden and part to Liège (German: Lüttich).

These years were very certainly hard. Because of poor harvests in 1816 and 1817, food prices rose enormously. There were seven children in his family at this time and his income was extremely low, there being now no demand for a French teacher, with the French Empire having collapsed. Eventually, through the intervention of the inspector of water supply, he got a well paid contract for some map-drawing lasting a couple of years. Astronomy also brought him some map-work.

He was able, however to make a trip to the Siebengebirge, chiefly for botany, and Meigen made some drawings of plants Hamburg botanist for Professor Johann Georg Christian Lehmann.

In 1821, Meigen made the acquaintance of Professor Heinrich Moritz Gaede of Liège, whose name he gave to Trypeta gaedii and the tachinid genus Gaedia.

=== Wiedemann's second visit and a trip to Scandinavia ===
In 1822, Wiedemann made a second visit to Meigen, proposing that Meigen come to Kiel and revise the Fabrician collection, and offering to defray expenses. Meigen accepted, leaving for Hamburg on 23 June 1823. He was met in Hamburg by the entomologist Wilhelm Von Winthem, who invited him to stay at his home. Meigen found himself in the house in which the great poet and dramatist Klopstock spent the last 30 years of his life, and which Von Winthem's sister, Johanna Elisabeth von Winthem, Klopstock's widow, then owned. Here he studied the Winthem collection, which was so extensive that Meigen had to leave a more careful review of it for his return trip. He went on to Kiel to meet Wiedemann, He also met Heinrich Boie in Kiel. Next Meigen and Wiedemann went to Copenhagen to visit Westermann and work on the Museum collection, postponing the main job on the Fabrician collection. Meigen was permitted to take all of the material away for examination. On 19 July, the two of them went to Lund, where both Professor Carl Fredrik Fallén and Johan Wilhelm Zetterstedt met them. Meigen examined Fallén's and Zetterstedt's collections at length.

On 23 July, Wiedemann and Meigen returned to Copenhagen, where Meigen stayed. On 30 July they were back in Kiel, where everything in the collections of Fabricius and Westermann was carefully examined and compared, and the unknown species drawn and described. After completing the research in Kiel, both left for Hamburg. There Meigen examined the Winthem collection, but there were so many new species in it that Winthem decided to send it all to Stolberg, where it could be worked on more conveniently. Also in Hamburg, Meigen met the entomologist Sommer from Altona and met Lehmann again.

The trip to Denmark and Sweden lasted altogether 12 weeks, the result of which was a series of colored drawings of more than 400 species of insects, together with their descriptions and a large number of notes and corrections. Studies of his collection of the Diptera in Fabricius' collection led to a very substantial revision.

=== Last years ===
Soon after 1822, the French school closed down completely and Meigen took the unpaid position of organist for his parish. However, he wrote a choral book for which the church board paid him well. Meigen continued in this capacity until 1831.

In 1825, Meigen made a translation of François Fénelon ‘s Telemachus, and in the same year he was enabled to attend a meeting of naturalists in Berlin. Meigen's expenses were organised by Nees von Esenbeck, and many to whom he was known through his works on Diptera. He also saw there again Wiedemann. He took advantage of this occasion to examine the collection of the Natural History Museum of Berlin and those of Johann Friedrich Ruthé and Peter Friedrich Bouché.

Von Winthem visited Meigen in 1826. Meigen also made a trip in that year to Crefeld and Düsseldorf. The following year, 1827, a Handbuch für Schmetterlingsliebhaber (Handbook for Butterfly Collectors) appeared under his name, and he also started a much larger work on Lepidoptera. This latter appeared in fascicles, each of 10 quarto plates lithographed by Meigen himself. It went as far as the Euphalaenae, where lack of funds brought it to a close. He colored the plates in a few copies. The figures, except a very few borrowed from other works, were drawn by Meigen from specimens, many from the collection of an old friend, Seeger.

After discontinuation of the work on Lepidoptera and the completion of that on Diptera with its 6th volume, Meigen had Diptera sent to him for identification from many sources. Outstanding among them were contributions from Joseph Waltl and Heinrich Georg Bronn. These induced him to work up a supplementary volume, which was notable for the division of the genera Tachina, Musca, and Anthomyia, into a number of genera based upon more critical characters than those used by previous French and English workers.

At the same time Meigen worked industriously on a Flora of Germany, which was not completed until a few years before his death. The last volume of this work, also containing numerous drawings made largely from nature by Meigen himself, appeared in 1842. It was his last work.

When the French dipterologist Justin Macquart visited him in 1839 to see his collection, Meigen also showed him two thick quarto volumes of drawings containing 300 plates of colored and mostly enlarged drawings of all the species that he had described. Macquart told Meigen that he would like to buy them, quoting a price of 1800 francs on behalf of the Jardin des Plantes in Paris. He paid an additional 1200 francs for Meigen's collection of Diptera, which also went to Paris. In the 1970s the colour paintings were published as plates by Morge.

Meigen then disposed of his library and the remainder of his collections. His books, fruit, and plant collections were bought by the Verein für natürliche Wissenschaften und Gewerbe (Society for natural sciences and industry) in Aachen. All of his insects other than Diptera were bought by Arnold Foerster, along with a few manuscripts including colored drawings of Hymenoptera.

In 1839, the Crown-Prince of Prussia awarded Meigen a pension of 200 thalers a year. On 3 May 1845, Meigen was presented with a doctor's diploma from the University of Bonn. Meigen died in Stolberg near Aachen (Aix-la-Chapelle), on 11 July 1845 at the age of 81.

== Legacy ==
Meigen is universally recognized as the "father" of dipterology. Aside from his accurate and detailed drawings, Meigen's key achievement was to employ combinations of morphological characters to work out his scientific classification. This was in contrast to his Swedish contemporary Carl Fredrik Fallén, who had used mouthpart characters alone. Thus he had come to the same conclusion as Pierre André Latreille, Moses Harris, and Louis Jurine, though independently, to establish a novel methodology.

Meigen described a vast number of European Diptera (mostly valid) and his work laid the foundations of all later work on this important insect group.

== Flies described by Meigen (not complete) ==
Meigen described over 3,000 taxa. Here is a list of a few well-known ones:

- the fruit fly, Drosophila melanogaster, which is a model organism in the study of genetics.
- Tephritis neesii
- Phormia regina
- Lucilia silvarum
- Criorhina berberina
- Thaumatomyia notata
- Lucilia sericata
- Muscina pascuorum
- genus Microdon
- genus Ctenophora
- genus Chrysops
- genus Haematopota
- family Culicidae

=== Works ===
Diptera

The two major works are:

- Meigen, J. W., 1804 Klassifikazion und Beschreibung der europäischen zweiflügeligen Insekten in English, Classification and description of the European two-winged insects Reichard, Braunschweig.
- Meigen, J. W., 1818-1838 Systematische Beschreibung der bekannten europäischen zweiflügeligen Insekten in English, Systematic description of the known European two-winged insects. This is a seven-volume work. The first volume was published in 1818, the last in 1838.
Selection from Systematische Beschreibung

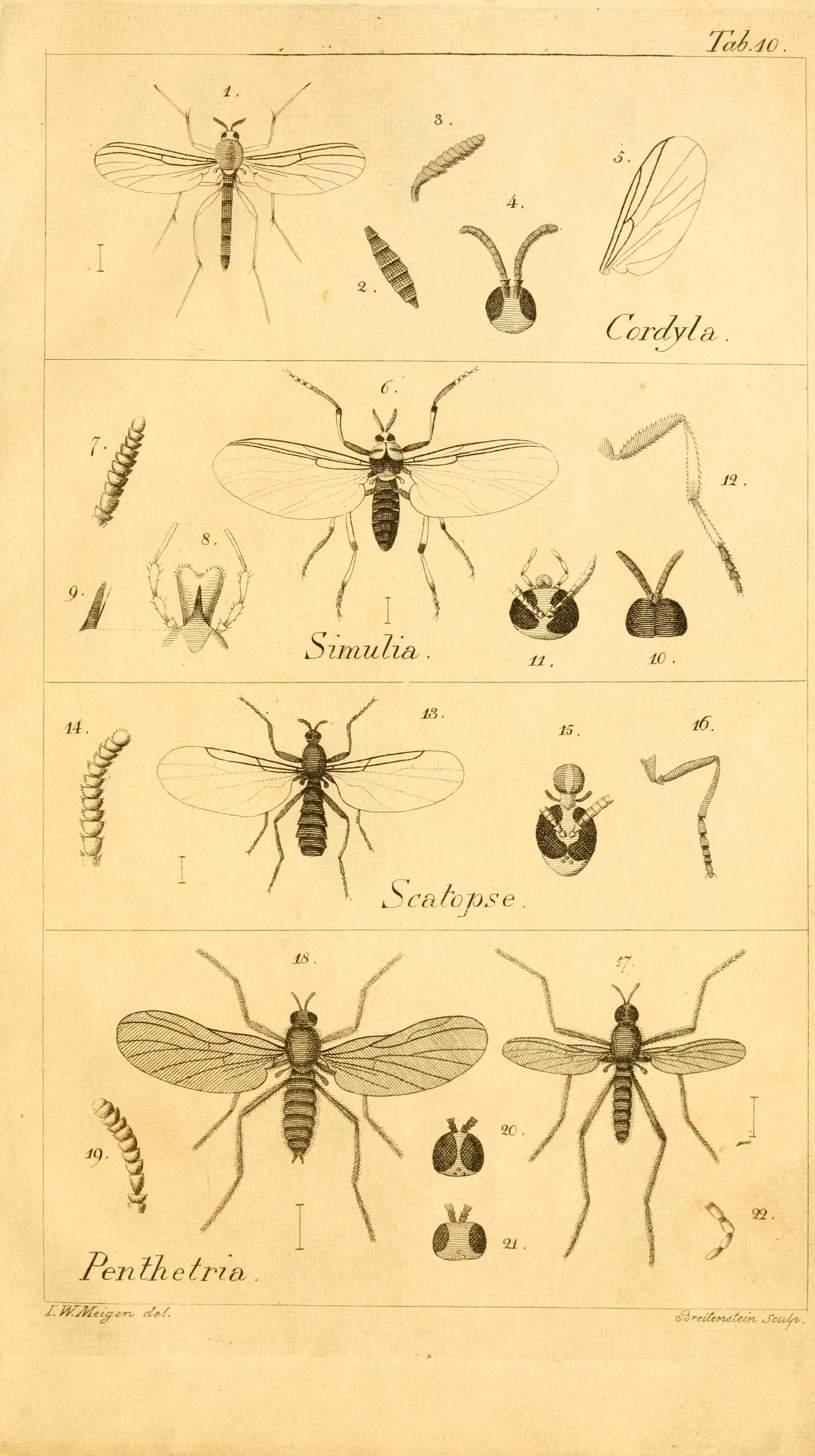
Vol 1, 1818, Plate 10

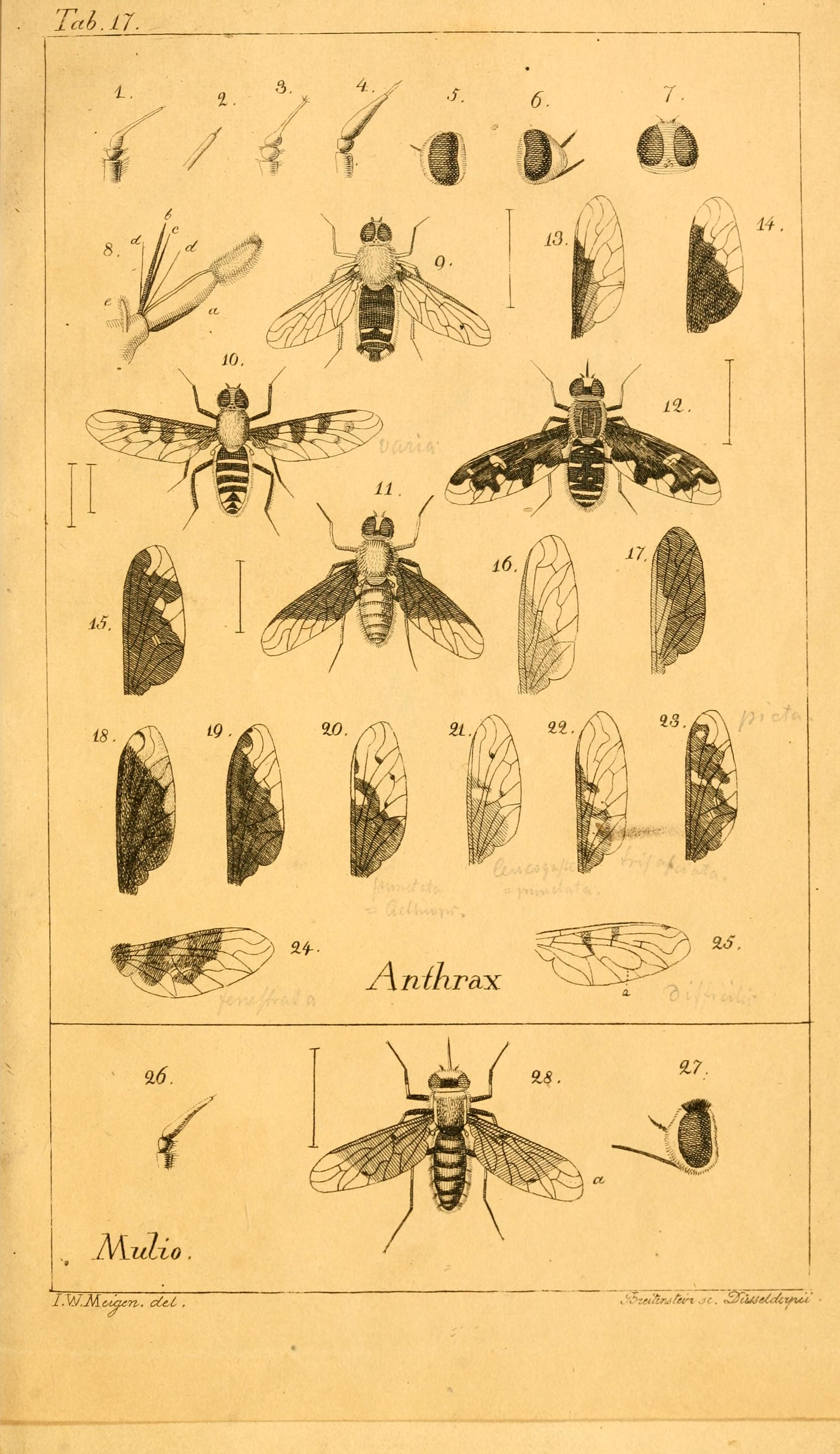
Vol 2, 1820, Plate 17
(Picture-winged flies)

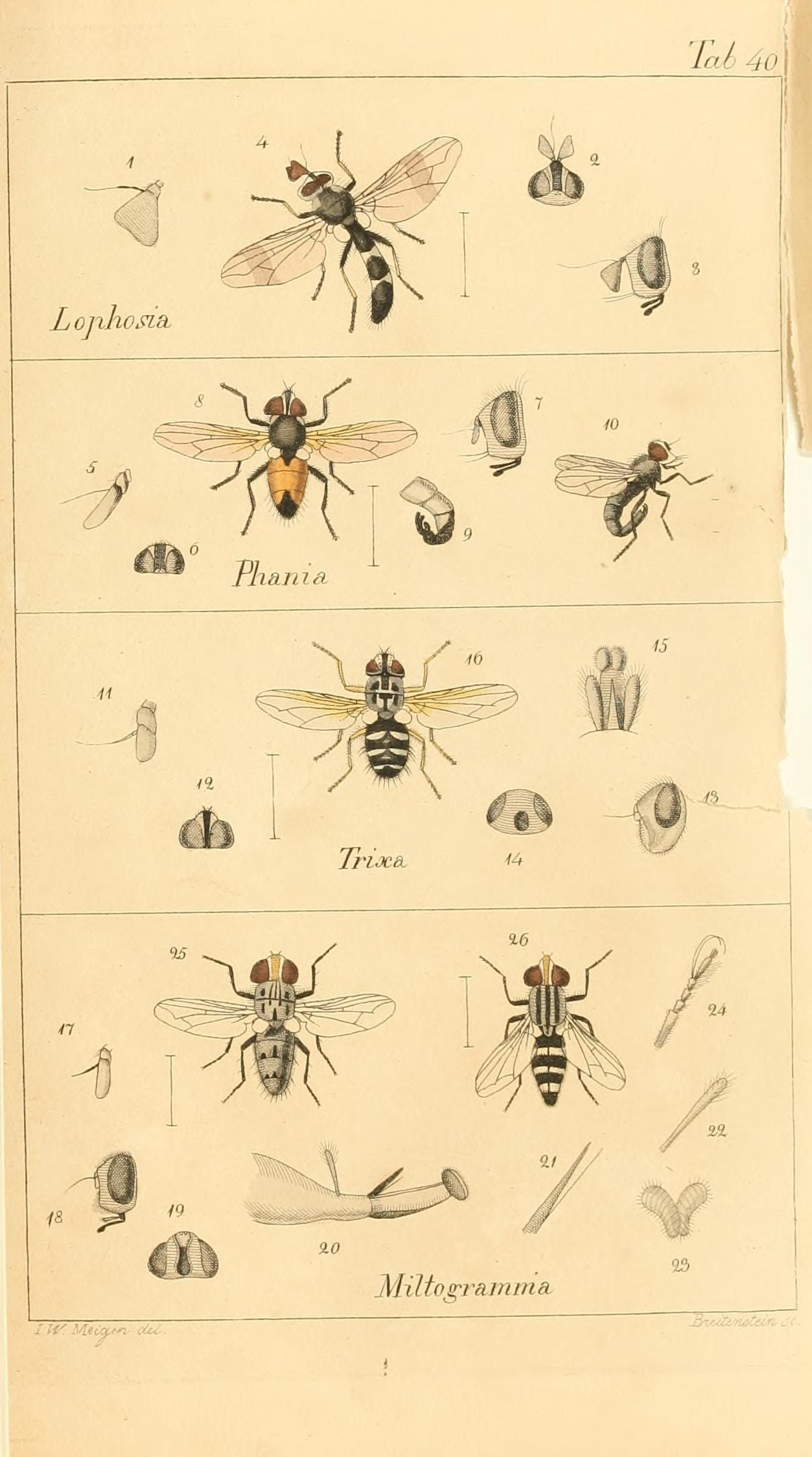
Vol 4, 1824, Plate 40

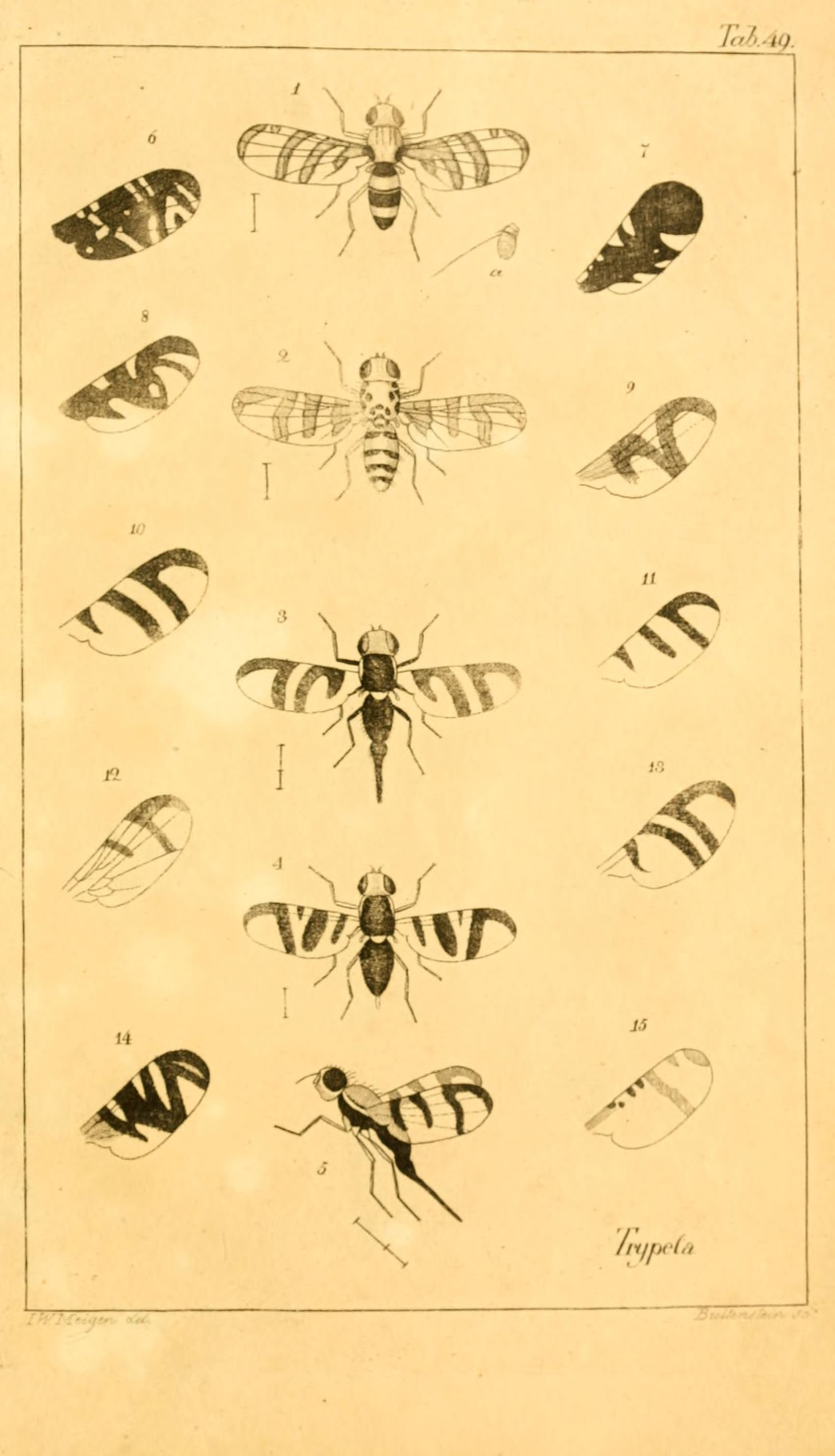
Vol 5, 1826, Plate 49
(Trypeta fruit flies)

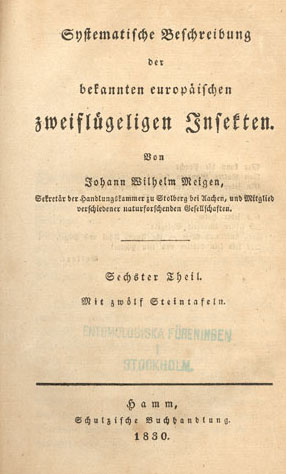
Frontis Systematische Beschreibung der bekannten europäischen zweiflügeligen Insekten

These masterworks were preceded by:

- 1800 Nouvelle Classification des Mouches A Deux Ailes(Diptera L.)d'apres un plan tout nouveau (Paris, chez J. J. Fuchs, Librairie, Rue des Mathurins, No. 334. De I'lmprimerie de H. L. Perronneau/Rue du Battoir, No. 8).

Nouvelle Classification is an octavo pamphlet of forty pages print dated both according to the French Revolutionary Calendar and according to the Christian Year as AN VIII (Year 8). Meigen's "Avant-Propos" (preface) is dated "le premier Germinal an 7" (21 March 1799) and Baumhauer's "Introduction" is dated "le 10 Messidor an 7" and so the work dates from early 1800. Nouvelle Classification is a "prodrome" (A prodromus is a preliminary publication intended as a basis for future work) to a planned larger work, following discussion. The Diptera are divided into 88 genera, each with a short diagnosis in French and the number of European species which Meigen recognised as belonging to each genus. No nominal species are cited. Of the 88 nominal genera, 25 had already been named by previous authors and 63 were new.

- 1803 Meigen published Versuch einer neuen Gattungseintheilung der europäischen zweiflügeligen Insekten. in Magazin für Insektenkunde (2: 259-281). This proposes a revised scheme. Meigen makes no reference to the 1800 Nouvelle Classification and only two of the new names proposed in 1800 are used. The total number of genera recognised in Gattungseintheilung der europäischen zweiflügeligen Insekten is 114, each with a brief diagnosis, and each with one or more nominal species referred to it. This is the basic plan for the two later works.

In 1908 Hendel reintroduced Meigen's 1800 names and republished Nouvelle Classification des Mouches A Deux Ailes which had priority. This was controversial and in 1963 the 1800 names (and the publication) were suppressed by the International Code of Zoological Nomenclature.

- 1828-1830 Plates for Christian Rudolph Wilhelm Wiedemann, Aussereuropäische Zweiflügelige Insekten / beschrieben von Christ. Rud. Wilh. Wiedemann; als Fortsetzung des Meigenischen Werkes. Hamm: in der Schulzischen Buchhandlung.

Lepidoptera

- Systematische Beschreibung der Europäischen Schmetterlinge Aachen; Leipzig, [1827]-1829-32.pdf including colour plates

=== Collections ===
Most of the Meigen collection is in the Muséum National d'Histoire Naturelle, Paris. There are other specimens, including types in the Natural History Museum of Vienna. Because Meigen exchanged specimens, including types with other entomologists the collection in MNHN contains not only Meigen type material, but types of other authors as well (such as Carl Fredrik Fallén, Johan Christian Fabricius, Christian Rudolph Wilhelm Wiedemann, and Pietro Rossi) and Meigen types are found in the collections of these authors of species names.

A sample from the collections

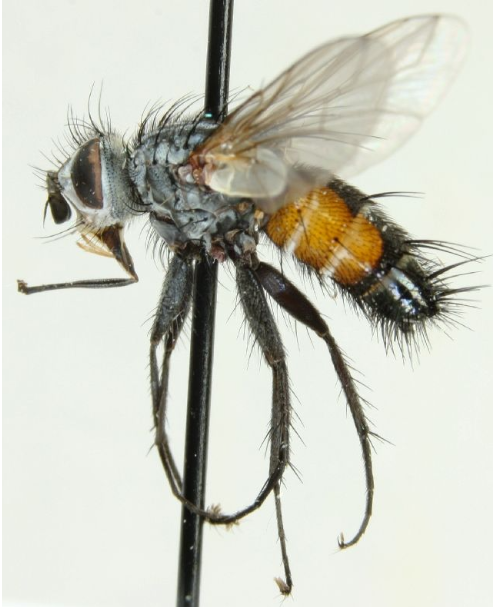
Aphria longirostris specimen

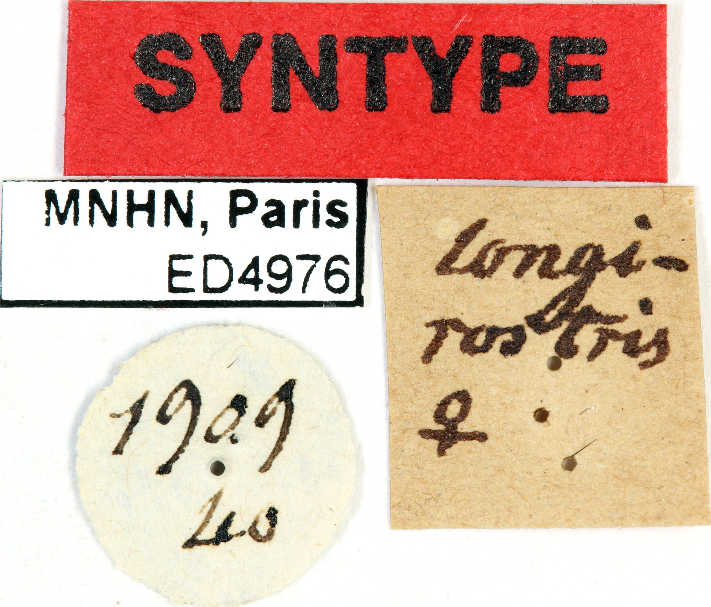
Aphria longirostris label

== Sources and references ==
- J.A. Förster (1974). On the life and influence of J.W. Meigen, Mosquito Systematics, 6 (2): 79-88.
- Morge, G. 1975. Dipteren Farbtafeln nach den bisher nicht veroofentlichen Original Handzeichnungen Meigens. Tafel 1-80. Beitrage zur Entomologie 25: 383-500.
- Morge, G. 1976 Dipteren Farbtafeln nach den bisher nicht veroofentlichen Original Handzeichnungen Meigens. Tafel 81-160. Beitrage zur Entomologie 26: 441.
- Morge, G. 1976b. Dipteren Farbtafeln nach den bisher nicht veroofentlichen Original Handzeichnungen Meigens. Tafel 161-305. Beitrage zur Entomologie 26: 543.
- Pont, A. 1986 A Revision of the Fanniidae and Muscidae described by J. W. Meigen (Insecta: Diptera) Ann. Natur hist. Mus. Wien 87 B 197-253 Wien, Mai pdf
