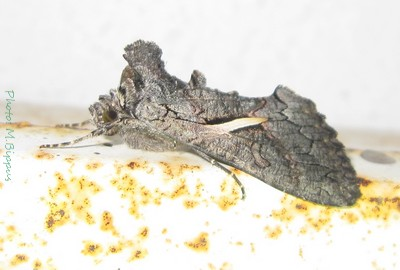
- Ctenoplusia vittata borbonica

Scientific classification
- Kingdom: Animalia
- Phylum: Arthropoda
- Clade: Pancrustacea
- Class: Insecta
- Order: Lepidoptera
- Superfamily: Noctuoidea
- Family: Noctuidae
- Tribe: Argyrogrammatini
- Genus: Ctenoplusia; Dufay, 1970

= Ctenoplusia =

Genus of moths

Ctenoplusia is a genus of moths of the family Noctuidae. The type species of this genus is Plusia limbirena by original designation.

== Species ==
- Ctenoplusia accentifera Lefèbvre, 1827
- Ctenoplusia adiaphora Dufay, 1974
- Ctenoplusia aeneofusa Hampson, 1894
- Ctenoplusia aenescens Prout, 1921
- Ctenoplusia agnata Staudinger, 1892
- Ctenoplusia albostriata Bremer & Grey, 1853
- Ctenoplusia amydra Dufay, 1972
- Ctenoplusia armata Behounek & Ronkay, 1999
- Ctenoplusia asteia Dufay, 1972
- Ctenoplusia astrapaea Dufay, 1972
- Ctenoplusia aurisuta Dufay, 1968
- Ctenoplusia caelata Dufay, 1972
- Ctenoplusia calceolaris (Walker, [1858])
- Ctenoplusia camptogamma Hampson, 1910
- Ctenoplusia caudata Schaus, 1906
- Ctenoplusia chalcopasta Hampson, 1912
- Ctenoplusia crinoides Dufay, 1972
- Ctenoplusia dargei Dufay, 1972
- Ctenoplusia dorfmeisteri Felder, 1874
- Ctenoplusia dufanyi Behounek & Ronkay, 1999
- Ctenoplusia edora Prout, 1927
- Ctenoplusia epargyra Dufay, 1968
- Ctenoplusia etiennei Dufay, 1975
- Ctenoplusia euchroa Hampson, 1918
- Ctenoplusia euchroides Carcasson, 1965
- Ctenoplusia eugrapha Hampson, 1913
- Ctenoplusia fracta Walker, [1858]
- Ctenoplusia fulgens Dufay, 1972
- Ctenoplusia furcifera Walker, [1858]
- Ctenoplusia gammaloba Hampson, 1910
- Ctenoplusia gemmata Dufay, 1972
- Ctenoplusia glaphyra Dufay, 1982
- Ctenoplusia griveaudi Dufay, 1968
- Ctenoplusia guenei Wallengren, 1856
- Ctenoplusia herbuloti Dufay, 1982
- Ctenoplusia ichinosei Dufay, 1965
- Ctenoplusia indica Ronkay, 1986
- Ctenoplusia isospila Dufay, 1972
- Ctenoplusia javana Behounek & Ronkay, 1999
- Ctenoplusia karthalae Dufay, 1982
- Ctenoplusia kobesi Behounek & Thöny, 1997
- Ctenoplusia kosemponensis Strand, 1920
- Ctenoplusia latistigma Prout, 1922
- Ctenoplusia lavendula Hampson, 1902
- Ctenoplusia leucostigma Dufay, 1968
- Ctenoplusia limbirena Guenée, 1852
- Ctenoplusia mapongua Holland, 1894
- Ctenoplusia melanocephala Möschler, 1884
- Ctenoplusia micans Dufay, 1968
- Ctenoplusia microptera Ronkay, 1989
- Ctenoplusia molybdina Dufay, 1968
- Ctenoplusia mutans Walker, 1865
- Ctenoplusia nigrogemmea Romieux, 1943
- Ctenoplusia obtusisigna Walker, [1858]
- Ctenoplusia ogovana Holland, 1894
- Ctenoplusia orbifer Guenée, 1865
- Ctenoplusia oxygramma Geyer, 1832
- Ctenoplusia pauliana Dufay, 1968
- Ctenoplusia perispomena Dufay, 1972
- Ctenoplusia perplexa Dufay, 1975
- Ctenoplusia petraea Dufay, 1972
- Ctenoplusia phocea Hampson, 1910
- Ctenoplusia phoceoides Dufay, 1972
- Ctenoplusia placida Moore, [1884]
- Ctenoplusia polycampta Dufay, 1972
- Ctenoplusia porphyrea Dufay, 1970
- Ctenoplusia proseides Dufay, 1972
- Ctenoplusia psileia Dufay, 1975
- Ctenoplusia rhodographa Dufay, 1968
- Ctenoplusia rubronitens Dufay, 1972
- Ctenoplusia scoteina Dufay, 1972
- Ctenoplusia selagisma Dufay, 1972
- Ctenoplusia seyrigi Dufay, 1968
- Ctenoplusia siculifera Holland, 1894
- Ctenoplusia sigillata Dufay, 1970
- Ctenoplusia sumbawana Behounek & Ronkay, 1999
- Ctenoplusia tarassota Hampson, 1913
- Ctenoplusia triteia Dufay, 1972
- Ctenoplusia vermiculata Dufay, 1970
- Ctenoplusia vittata Wallengren, 1856
