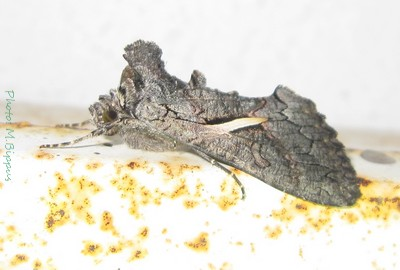
- Ctenoplusia vittata borbonica
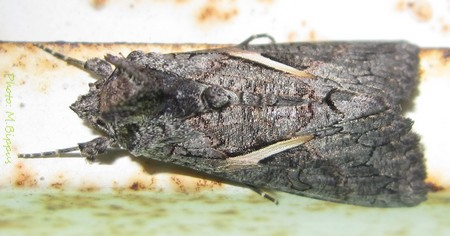

Scientific classification
- Kingdom: Animalia
- Phylum: Arthropoda
- Class: Insecta
- Order: Lepidoptera
- Superfamily: Noctuoidea
- Family: Noctuidae
- Genus: Ctenoplusia
- Species: C. vittata

Binomial name
- Ctenoplusia vittata Wallengren, 1856

Synonyms
- Trichoplusia vittata; Plusia vittata; Abrostola transfixa; Habrostola commidendri; Trichoplusia transfixa

= Ctenoplusia vittata =

Streaked plusia

Species of moth

Ctenoplusia vittata, commonly known as the streaked plusia, is a moth of the family Noctuidae. It is found in Africa (south of the Sahara), the Arabian Peninsula, Madagascar, Saint Helena, Tripolitania, the Near East and West Pakistan.

In Réunion is found the sub-species: Ctenoplusia vittata borbonica [Guillermet, 2006)

The wingspan is about 37 mm.

The larvae feed on Solanum crinitum, Erigeron albidus, Solanum mauritianum (Solanaceae) and Erigeron albidus (Asteraceae).
