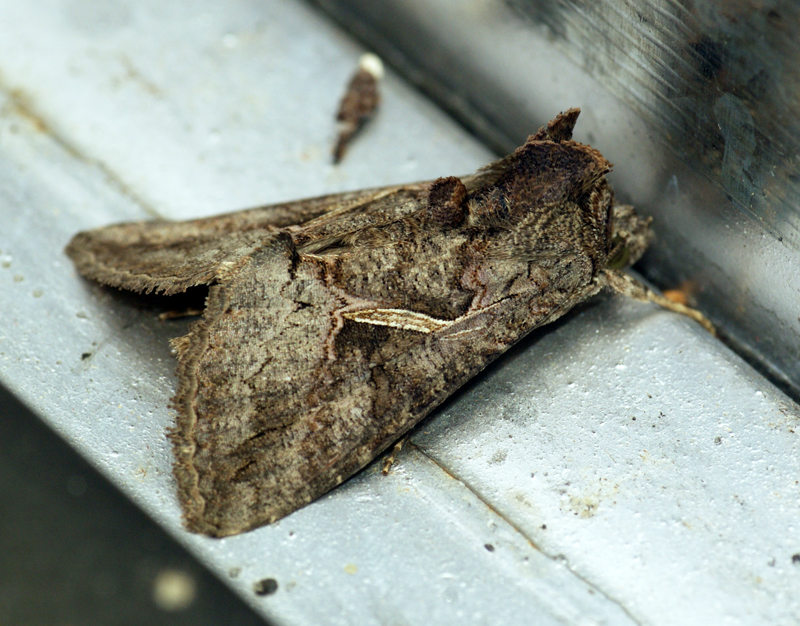

Scientific classification
- Kingdom: Animalia
- Phylum: Arthropoda
- Clade: Pancrustacea
- Class: Insecta
- Order: Lepidoptera
- Superfamily: Noctuoidea
- Family: Noctuidae
- Genus: Ctenoplusia
- Species: C. albostriata

Binomial name
- Ctenoplusia albostriata (Bremer & Grey, 1853)

Synonyms
- Plusia albostriata Bremer & Grey, 1853; Abrostola subchalybaea Walker, 1865; Abrostola nubila Moore, 1887; Phytometra albostriata acuminata Strand, 1917; Phytometra albostriata albolimbalis Strand, 1917; Phytometra albostriata disjunctana Strand, 1917

= Ctenoplusia albostriata =

Eastern streaked plusia

Species of moth

Ctenoplusia albostriata, the eastern streaked plusia, is a moth of the family Noctuidae. It is found in India, Sri Lanka, eastern Asia and the Pacific, including Borneo, Hong Kong, Vietnam, Japan, most of Australia and New Zealand.

== Taxonomy ==
This species was first described by Otto Bremer and William Grey in 1853 and originally named Plusia albostriata. George Hudson, in his 1928 book The butterflies and moths of New Zealand, described and illustrated this species under the name Plusia oxygramma.

== Description ==
The wingspan is about 30–42 mm. Palpi with short third joint. Hind femur of male not tufted with long hair. Head and thorax and forewings are full brown with a grey tinge. Sub-basal, antemedial and postmedial waved lines are brownish and indistinct. Orbicular narrow, elongate and brownish with white edges. There is a white streak found on median nervure conjoined to a brown streak with pale edges on vein 2, terminating at the postmedial line. A dark dentate submarginal line present. Hindwings fuscous with pale base.

The larvae feed on various plants, including Conyza bonariensis and several other Asteraceae species, as well as Dichrostachys cinerea. Other recorded food plants include Erigeron, Symphytum, Calystegia, Elephantopus, Calendula, Callistephus, Dahlia, Solidago, Aster, Abelia, Dichrocephala and Polygonum.

== Distribution ==
This species is a regular immigrant to New Zealand and is likely established in the north of that country.
