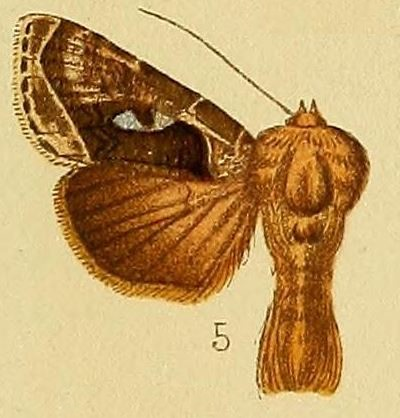
- Agrapha gammaloba

Scientific classification
- Kingdom: Animalia
- Phylum: Arthropoda
- Clade: Pancrustacea
- Class: Insecta
- Order: Lepidoptera
- Superfamily: Noctuoidea
- Family: Noctuidae
- Subfamily: Plusiinae
- Genus: Agrapha; Hübner, 1821

= Agrapha (moth) =

Genus of moths

Agrapha is a genus of moths of the family Noctuidae erected by Jacob Hübner in 1821.

== Species ==
as per

- Agrapha adiaphora (Dufay 1974)
- Agrapha agnata (Staudinger 1892)
- Agrapha ahenea Hubner 1821
- Agrapha albostriata (Bremer & Grey 1853)
- Agrapha aurisuta (Dufay 1968)
- Agrapha duboisi Barbut, 2008
- Agrapha epargyra (Dufay 1968)
- Agrapha eugrapha (Hampson 1913)
- Agrapha furcifera (Walker 1858)
- Agrapha gammaloba (Hampson 1910)
- Agrapha gigantea Barbut, 2008
- Agrapha griveaudi (Dufay 1968)
- Agrapha herbuloti (Dufay 1982)
- Agrapha ichinosei (Dufay 1965)
- Agrapha laqueta (Dufay 1968)
- Agrapha latistigma (Prout 1922)
- Agrapha leucostigma (Dufay 1968)
- Agrapha meretricia Schaus, 1911
- Agrapha micans (Dufay 1968)
- Agrapha nigra Barbut, 2008
- Agrapha orbifer (Guenée 1865)
- Agrapha pauliana (Dufay 1968)
- Agrapha placida (Moore 1884)
- Agrapha rhodographa (Dufay 1968)
- Agrapha seyrigi (Dufay 1968)
- Agrapha sigillata (Dufay 1970)
- Agrapha tarassota (Hampson 1913)
- Agrapha vermiculata (Dufay 1970)
