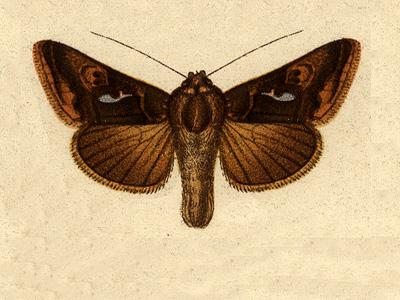

Scientific classification
- Kingdom: Animalia
- Phylum: Arthropoda
- Class: Insecta
- Order: Lepidoptera
- Superfamily: Noctuoidea
- Family: Noctuidae
- Genus: Ctenoplusia
- Species: C. calceolaris

Binomial name
- Ctenoplusia calceolaris (Walker, [1858])

Synonyms
- Plusia calceolaris Walker, [1858]; Thysanoplusia calceolaris; Agrapha calceolaris; Plusia incrassata Herrich-Schäffer, 1868

= Ctenoplusia calceolaris =

Species of moth

Ctenoplusia calceolaris is a moth of the family Noctuidae first described by Francis Walker in 1858. It is found in the Antilles, including the Dominican Republic and Cuba.
