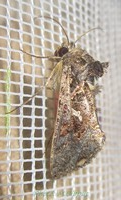

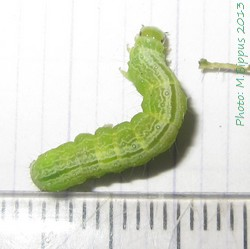

Scientific classification
- Kingdom: Animalia
- Phylum: Arthropoda
- Class: Insecta
- Order: Lepidoptera
- Superfamily: Noctuoidea
- Family: Noctuidae
- Genus: Ctenoplusia
- Species: C. limbirena

Binomial name
- Ctenoplusia limbirena (Guenée, 1852)

Synonyms
- Plusia limbirena Guenée, 1852; Agrapha limbirena (Guenée, 1852)

= Ctenoplusia limbirena =

Scar Bank gem

Species of moth

Ctenoplusia limbirena, the Scar Bank gem, or silver U-tail, is a moth of the family Noctuidae. It is found in south-western Europe, Africa (Lesotho, the Cape Province, KwaZulu-Natal, Transvaal, Mozambique, Zimbabwe, Zambia, Botswana, Malawi and eastern and equatorial Africa), the Canary Islands, Arabia, the southern Himalayas, India, Sri Lanka, Indochina to south-eastern China, Taiwan, Sulawesi, Bali and Timor. In New Zealand, it has been established since 2011.

== Description ==
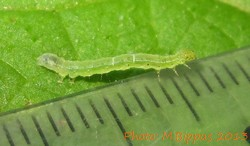
Juvenile caterpillar

The wingspan is 40–45 mm. Palpi with short third joint. Hind femur of male not tufted with long hair. Head and thorax clothed with grey and black scales. Abdomen pale with dark dorsal tufts. Forewings fuscous with a copper tinged. There are ill-defined darker medial and submarginal patches can be seen. The minutely waved double sub-basal and antemedial lines with silvery specks on them. Orbicular and reniform small, indistinct and with pink edges. There is a prominent silvery "Y-mark" can be seen below the cell. The minutely waved double postmedial line angled inwards above vein 1. There are traces of an irregularly sinuous sub-marginal line and a small pinkish patch found on center of outer margin. A marginal series of black specks found. Hindwings pale at base. The outer area suffused with fuscous with pale cilia. Ventral side is with indistinct lunule at end of cell and waved postmedial line.

The larvae are polyphagous and feed on Geranium, Solanum, Nicotiana, Althea (Malvaceae), Salvia and Primula species.
