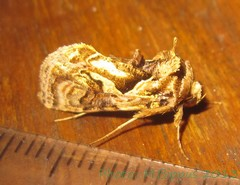

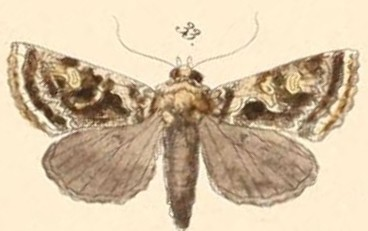

Scientific classification
- Domain: Eukaryota
- Kingdom: Animalia
- Phylum: Arthropoda
- Class: Insecta
- Order: Lepidoptera
- Superfamily: Noctuoidea
- Family: Noctuidae
- Genus: Ctenoplusia
- Species: C. dorfmeisteri

Binomial name
- Ctenoplusia dorfmeisteri (Felder & Rogenhofer, 1874)

Synonyms
- Plusia dorfmeisteri Felder & Rogenhofer, 1874; Plusia rhodochrysa de Joannis, 1906; Plusia siculifera Holland, 1894

= Ctenoplusia dorfmeisteri =

Species of moth

Ctenoplusia dorfmeisteri is a moth of the family Noctuidae. It is found in western, central and southern Africa, where it's known from Congo, Nigeria, Gabon, Ghana, South Africa, Mauritius, Réunion and from Yemen.

It has a wingspan of 30 mm.
