= Ctenoplusia fracta =

Scientific classification
- Kingdom: Animalia
- Phylum: Arthropoda
- Class: Insecta
- Order: Lepidoptera
- Superfamily: Noctuoidea
- Family: Noctuidae
- Genus: Ctenoplusia
- Species: C. fracta

Binomial name
- Ctenoplusia fracta (Walker, [1858])

Synonyms
- Plusia fracta Walker, [1858]

Species of moth

Ctenoplusia fracta is a moth of the family Noctuidae first described by Francis Walker in 1858.

== Distribution ==
It is found in many African countries such as Burkina Faso, Cameroon, the Democratic Republic of the Congo, Ethiopia, Kenya, Madagascar, Malawi, Mozambique, Nigeria, Senegal, Somalia, South Africa, Tanzania, Uganda and Zimbabwe. It is also found in Saudi Arabia, Yemen, India and Sri Lanka.

== Description ==
Palpi upturned. Male antennae ciliated. Thorax with a very large spreading tuft on the vertex. Abdomen with three large dorsal tufts on basal segments. Forewing hooked at outer angle. Head and thorax greyish brown. Forewing olive grey with metallic tinge with brown irrorations (speckles). Hindwing fuscous; cilia with tips white. Its host plant is Gymnosporia buxifolia.
