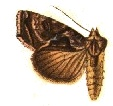

Scientific classification
- Kingdom: Animalia
- Phylum: Arthropoda
- Class: Insecta
- Order: Lepidoptera
- Superfamily: Noctuoidea
- Family: Noctuidae
- Genus: Ctenoplusia
- Species: C. camptogamma

Binomial name
- Ctenoplusia camptogamma (Hampson, 1910)

Synonyms
- Polychrysia camptogamma Hampson, 1910; Plusiopalpa camptogamma; Ctenoplusia (Ctenoplusia) camptogamma

= Ctenoplusia camptogamma =

Species of moth

Ctenoplusia camptogamma is a moth of the family Noctuidae. It is found in Africa including Kenya.
