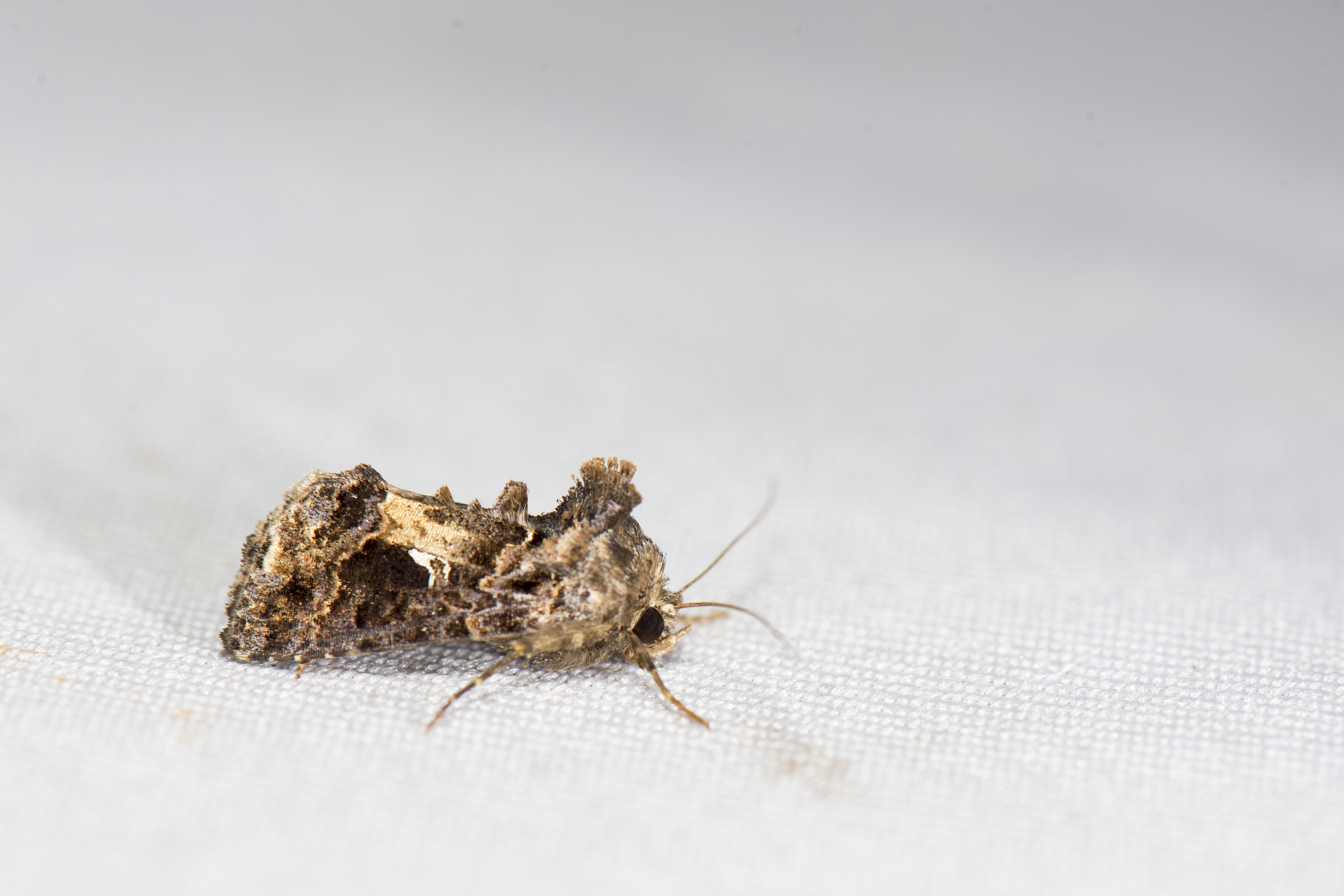

Scientific classification
- Kingdom: Animalia
- Phylum: Arthropoda
- Class: Insecta
- Order: Lepidoptera
- Superfamily: Noctuoidea
- Family: Noctuidae
- Genus: Ctenoplusia
- Species: C. furcifera

Binomial name
- Ctenoplusia furcifera (Walker, 1858)

Synonyms
- Plusia furcifera Walker, 1858; Plusia babooni Bethune-Baker, 1906; Phytometra polisha Strand, 1920; Argyrogramma yunnanensis Chou & Lu, 1978

= Ctenoplusia furcifera =

Species of moth

Ctenoplusia furcifera is a moth of the family Noctuidae. It is found in south-east Asia and the Pacific, including India, Taiwan, Australia and New Guinea.
