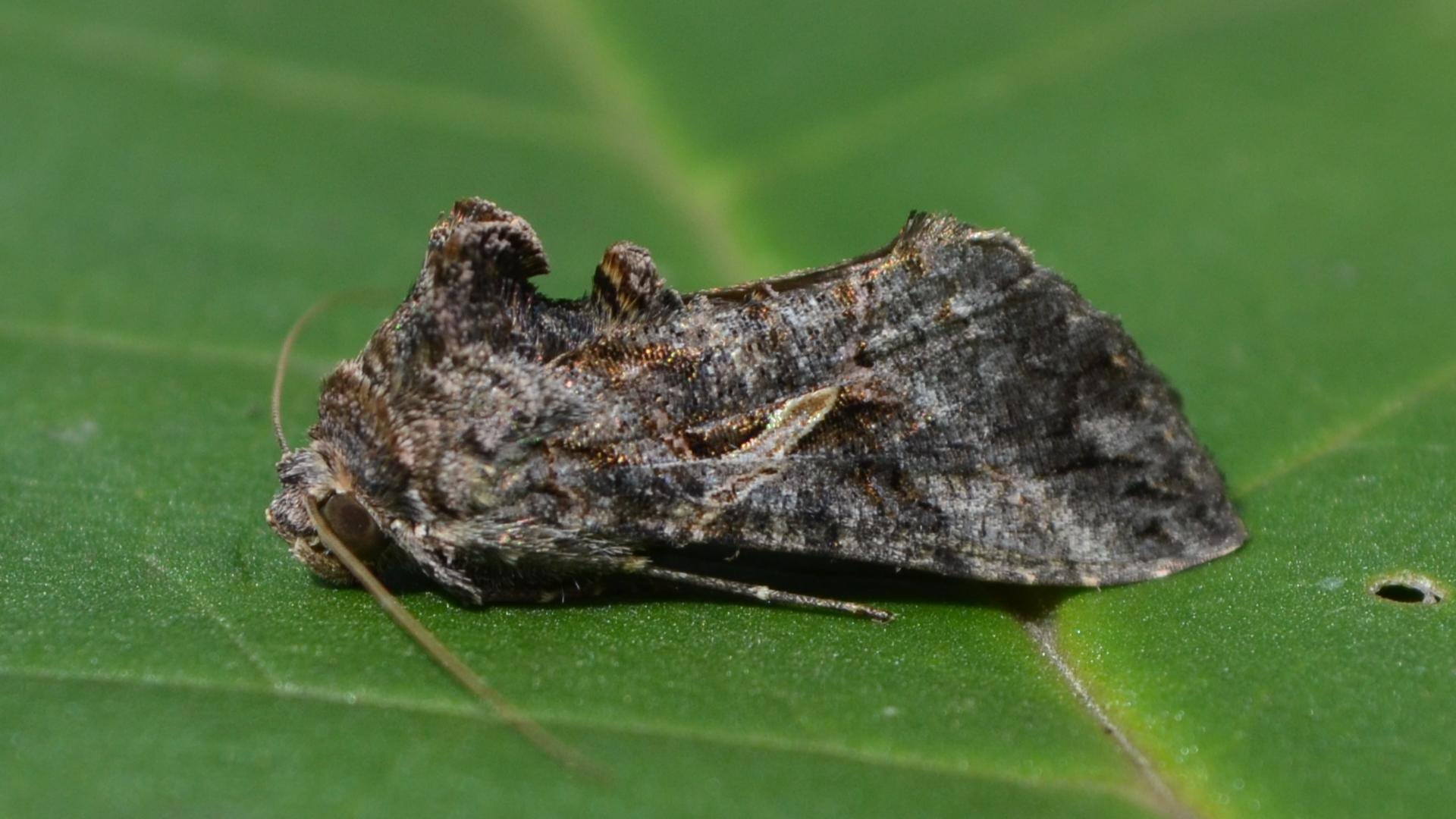

Scientific classification
- Domain: Eukaryota
- Kingdom: Animalia
- Phylum: Arthropoda
- Class: Insecta
- Order: Lepidoptera
- Superfamily: Noctuoidea
- Family: Noctuidae
- Genus: Ctenoplusia
- Species: C. oxygramma

Binomial name
- Ctenoplusia oxygramma (Geyer, 1832)

Synonyms
- Autographa oxygramma Geyer, 1832; Plusia indigna Walker, [1858]; Plusia parallela Walker, [1858]; Plusia collateralis Herrich-Schäffer, 1868; Agrapha oxygramma

= Ctenoplusia oxygramma =

Sharp stigma looper

Species of moth

Ctenoplusia oxygramma (sharp stigma looper) is a moth of the family Noctuidae. It is found in southern Ontario, the eastern parts of the United States to Arizona. It has also been reported from Kansas, Nebraska, Iowa, Wisconsin, Mexico, the Antilles and from California south to Brazil and India Argentina.

The wingspan is about 35 mm.

Recorded food plants include Aster, Erigeron canadensis, Nicotiana tabacum and Solidago.
