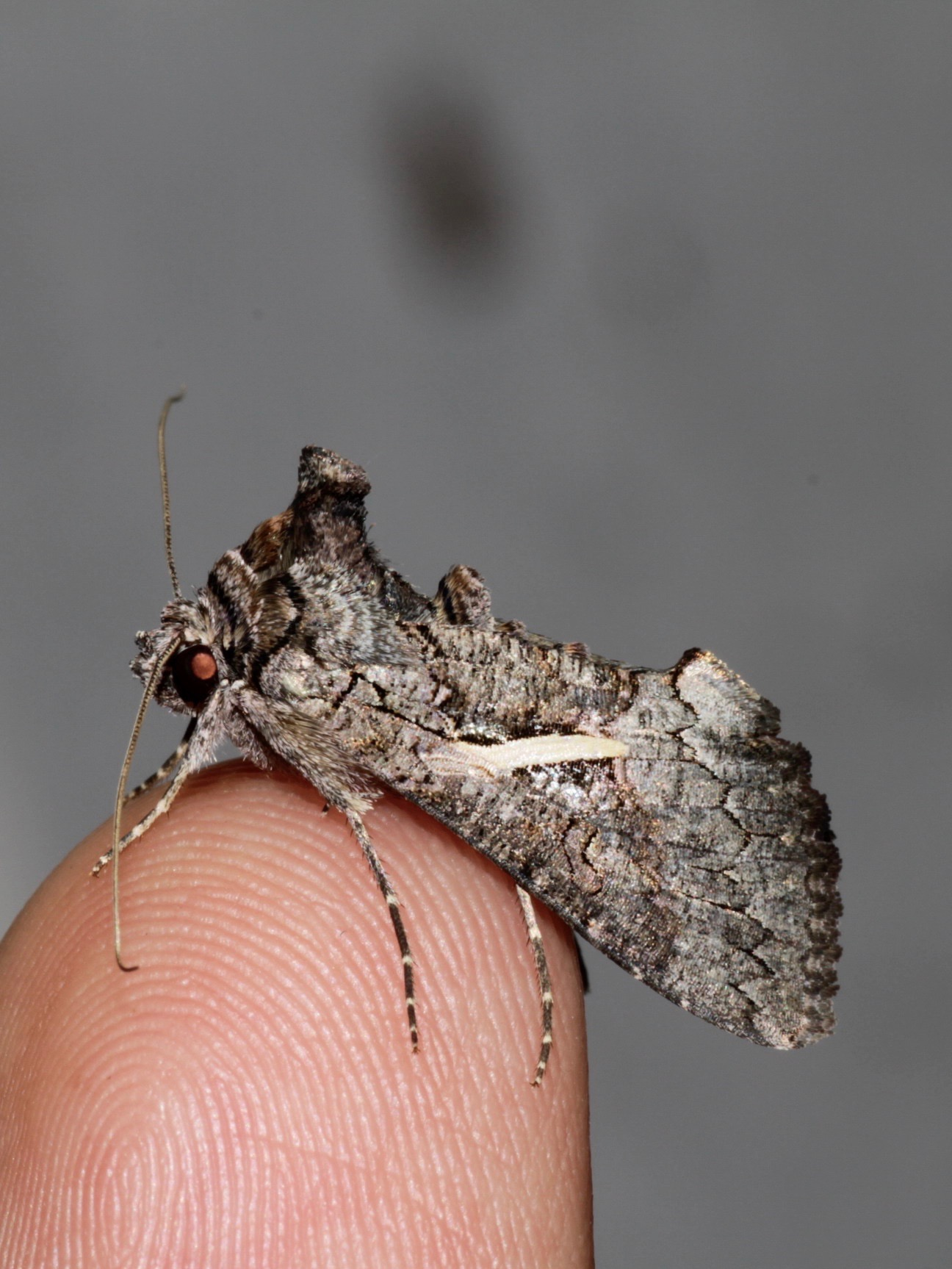

Scientific classification
- Kingdom: Animalia
- Phylum: Arthropoda
- Clade: Pancrustacea
- Class: Insecta
- Order: Lepidoptera
- Superfamily: Noctuoidea
- Family: Noctuidae
- Genus: Ctenoplusia
- Species: C. accentifera

Binomial name
- Ctenoplusia accentifera (Lefèbvre, 1827)

Synonyms
- Plusia accentifera; Plusia l-aureum; Ctenoplusia hieroglyphica; Agrapha accentifera

= Ctenoplusia accentifera =

Species of moth

Ctenoplusia accentifera is a moth of the family Noctuidae and is found in Africa, Asia and Europe. It was first described, in 1827, by the French entomologist Alexandre Louis Lefèbvre de Cérisy, from a specimen found in Sicily.

== Technical description and variation ==
P. accentifera Lef Forewing dull pinkish grey dusted with darker, and with irregular olive brown patches; lines pale; inconspicuous; the inner oblique outwards to median vein, then waved inwards, followed by brown patches; outer line lunulate, between two brown shades, interrupted below middle by a large brown blotch; a brown blotch from apex, a triangular one below middle of termen, and some small patches along subterminal line, which bears a black white-edged tooth between veins 2 and 3; the mark below median inconspicuous, yellowish grey, laterally finely edged with silvery, oblique and parallel; hindwing brownish, with dark outer line and broad smoky fuscous border. Larva green, with white dorsal and double white subdorsal lines; spiracular white, less conspicuous in front, yellower behind; tubercles black with long hairs. The wingspan is about 25 mm.

== Biology ==
The larvae are known to feed on water mint (Mentha aquatica), horse mint (Mentha rotundifolia) in Europe. Also found on vervain (Verbena species), and Cineraria, Coleus and Cichorium species.

== Distribution ==
It is found over most of Africa, the Azores, southern Europe (from Portugal to Greece) and the Lebanon. A rare migrant, there are two British records; the first in September, 1969 at Halstead, Kent and the second in October 2014 at Exmouth, Devon.

== Gallery ==
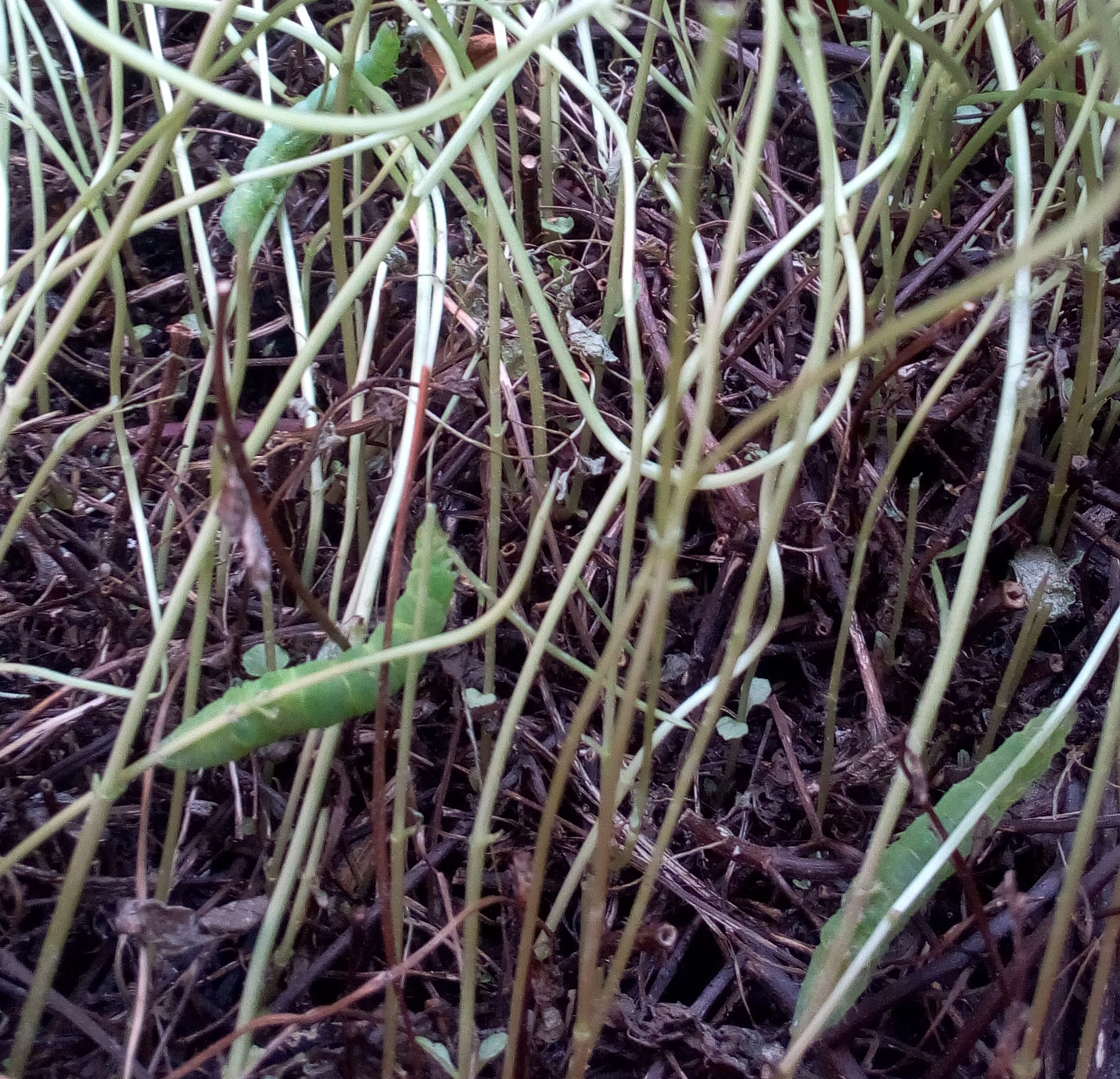
Larvae

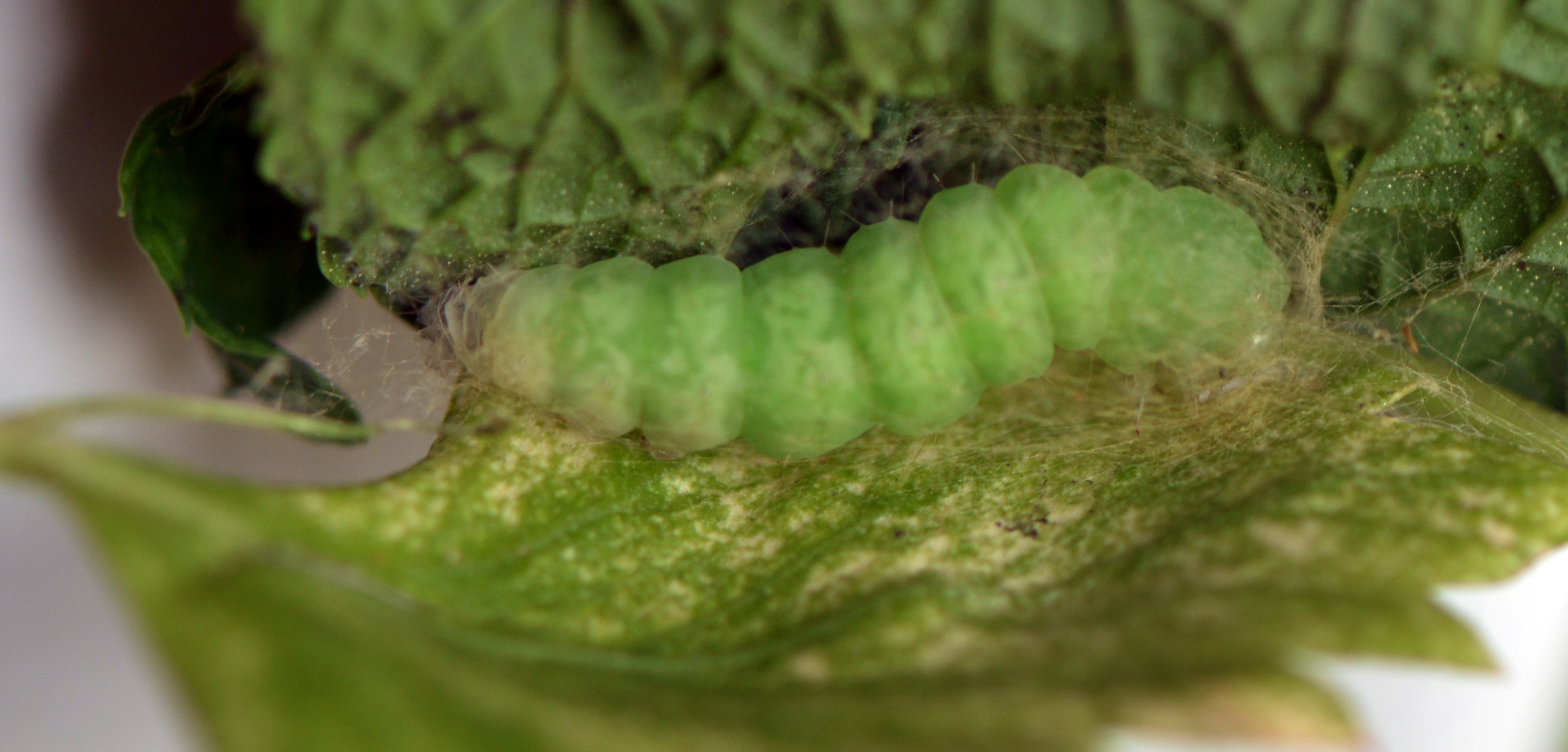
Larva in the process of transforming to a pupa

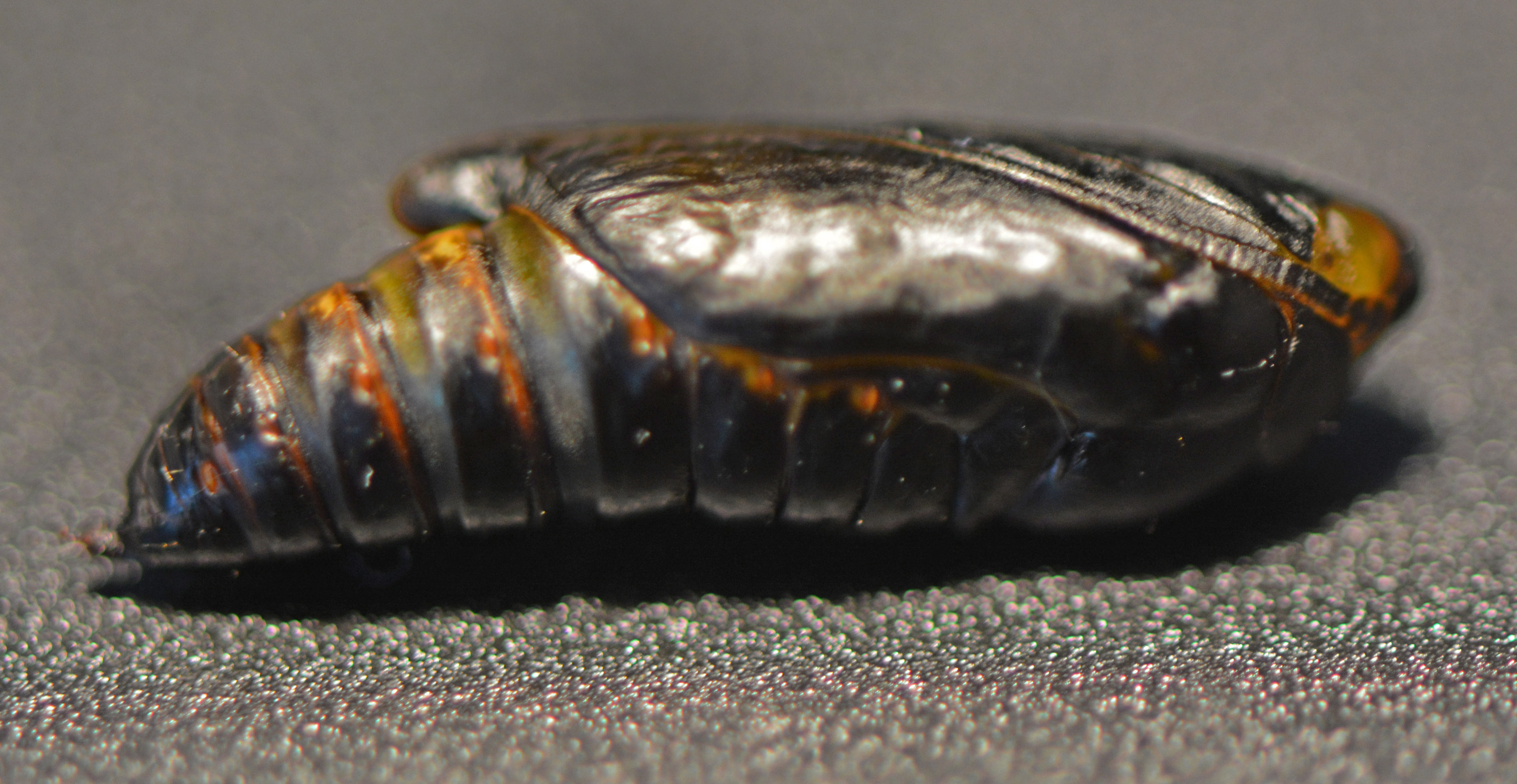
Pupa

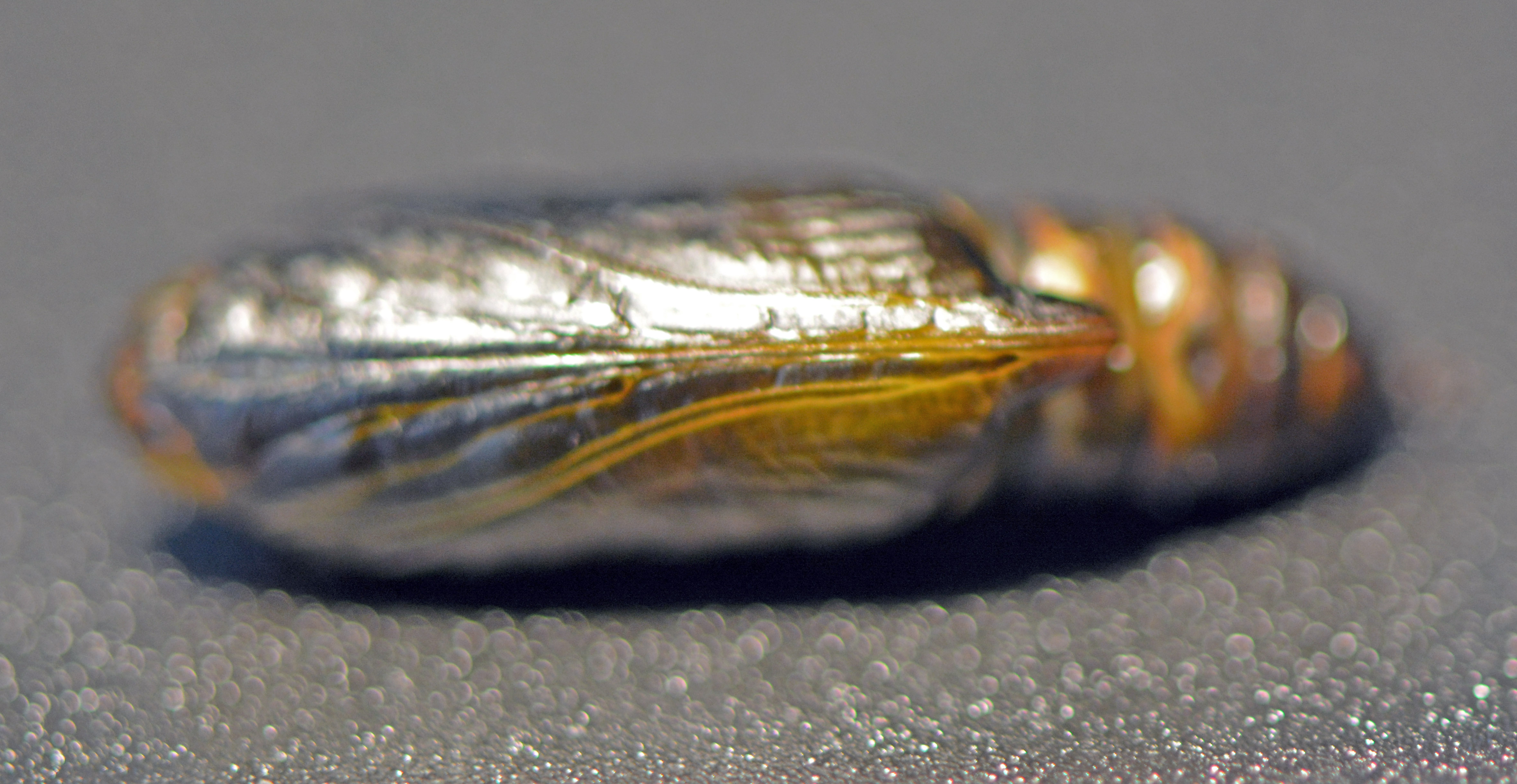
Pupa

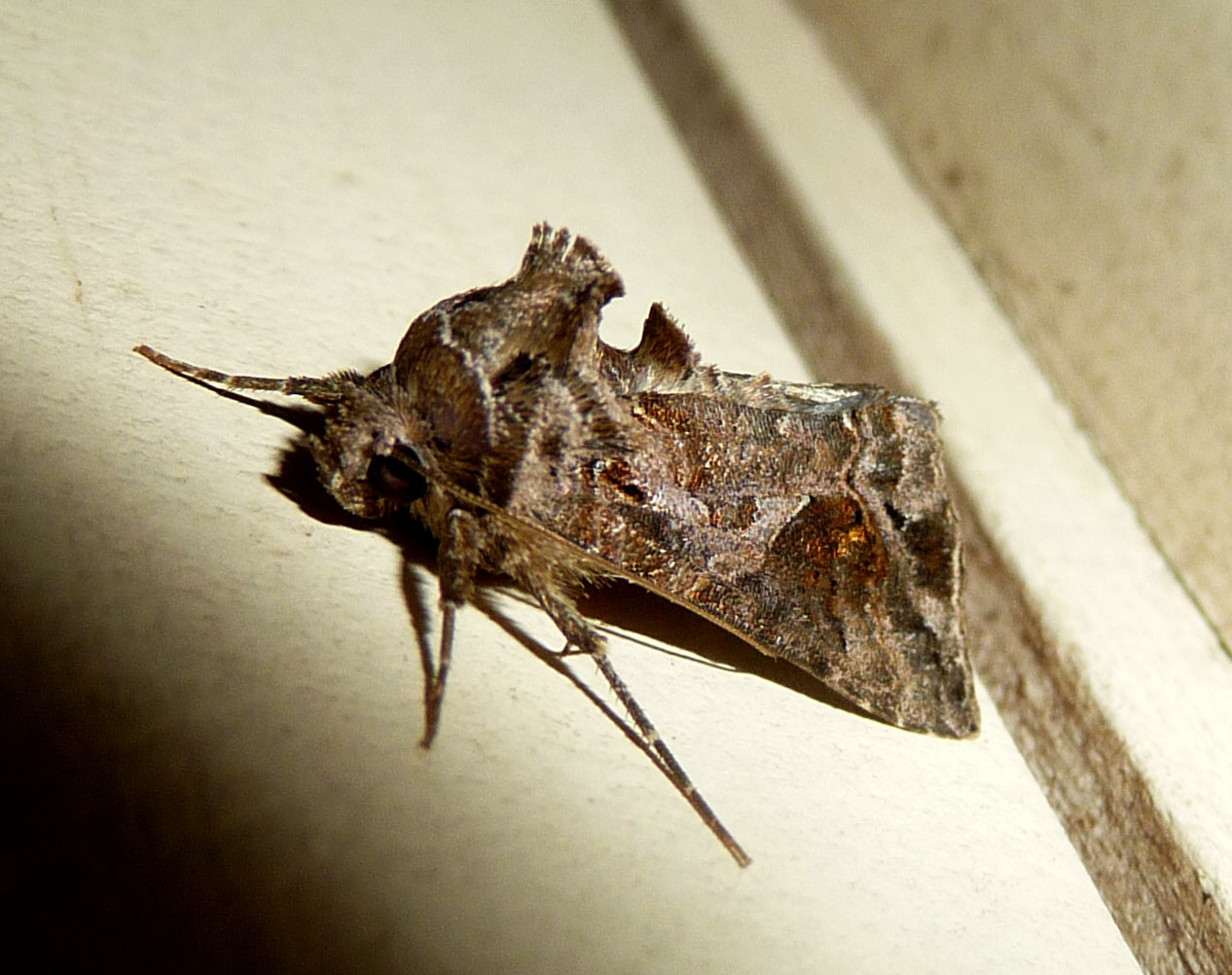
Imago

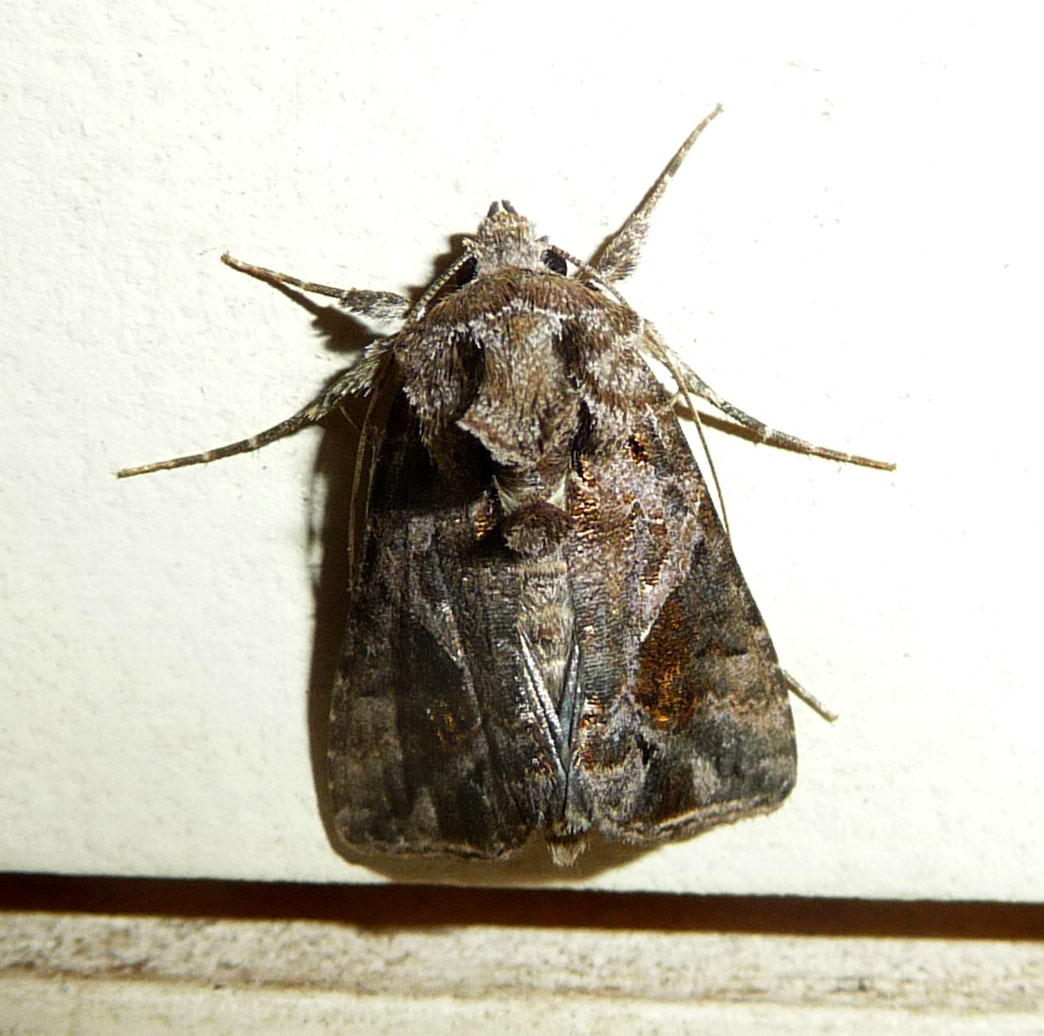
Imago
