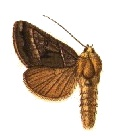

Scientific classification
- Kingdom: Animalia
- Phylum: Arthropoda
- Class: Insecta
- Order: Lepidoptera
- Superfamily: Noctuoidea
- Family: Noctuidae
- Genus: Ctenoplusia
- Species: C. aeneofusa

Binomial name
- Ctenoplusia aeneofusa Hampson, 1894

Synonyms
- Plusia aeneofusa; Argyrogramma aeneofusa

= Ctenoplusia aeneofusa =

Species of moth

Ctenoplusia aeneofusa is a moth of the family Noctuidae. It is found in the North-Eastern Himalayas.
