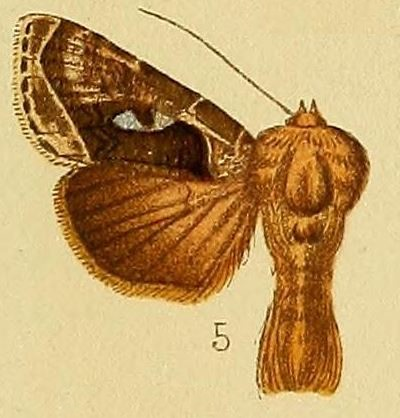

Scientific classification
- Kingdom: Animalia
- Phylum: Arthropoda
- Class: Insecta
- Order: Lepidoptera
- Superfamily: Noctuoidea
- Family: Noctuidae
- Genus: Agrapha
- Species: A. gammaloba

Binomial name
- Agrapha gammaloba (Hampson, 1910)

Synonyms
- Plusia gammaloba Hampson, 1910; Phytometra gammaloba Hampson, 1913; Ctenoplusia gammaloba

= Agrapha gammaloba =

Species of moth

Agrapha gammaloba is a moth of the family Noctuidae. It is found on Madagascar.
