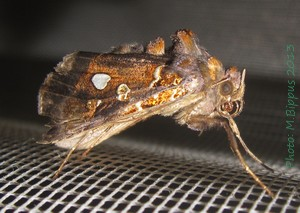
- Ctenoplusia sp.

Scientific classification
- Kingdom: Animalia
- Phylum: Arthropoda
- Clade: Pancrustacea
- Class: Insecta
- Order: Lepidoptera
- Superfamily: Noctuoidea
- Family: Noctuidae
- Genus: Agrapha
- Species: A. orbifer

Binomial name
- Agrapha orbifer (Guenée, 1865)

Synonyms
- Plusia orbifer Guenée, 1865; Ctenoplusia orbifer

= Agrapha orbifer =

Species of moth

Agrapha orbifer is a moth of the family Noctuidae. It is found on La Réunion.
