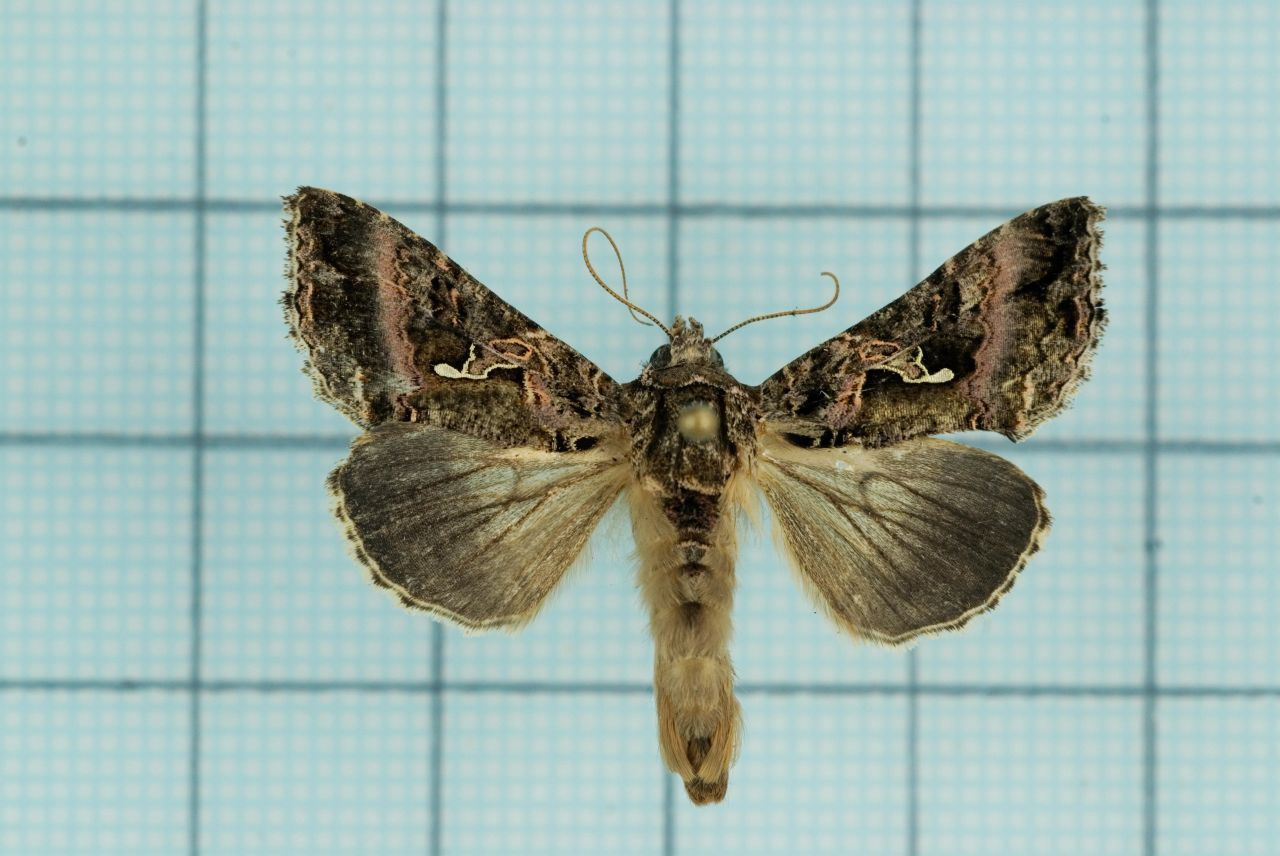

Scientific classification
- Domain: Eukaryota
- Kingdom: Animalia
- Phylum: Arthropoda
- Class: Insecta
- Order: Lepidoptera
- Superfamily: Noctuoidea
- Family: Noctuidae
- Genus: Ctenoplusia
- Species: C. adiaphora

Binomial name
- Ctenoplusia adiaphora Dufay, 1974

Synonyms
- Acanthoplusia adiaphora; Agrapha adiaphora

= Ctenoplusia adiaphora =

Species of moth

Ctenoplusia adiaphora is a moth of the family Noctuidae, first described by Claude Dufay in 1974. It is found in Taiwan.
