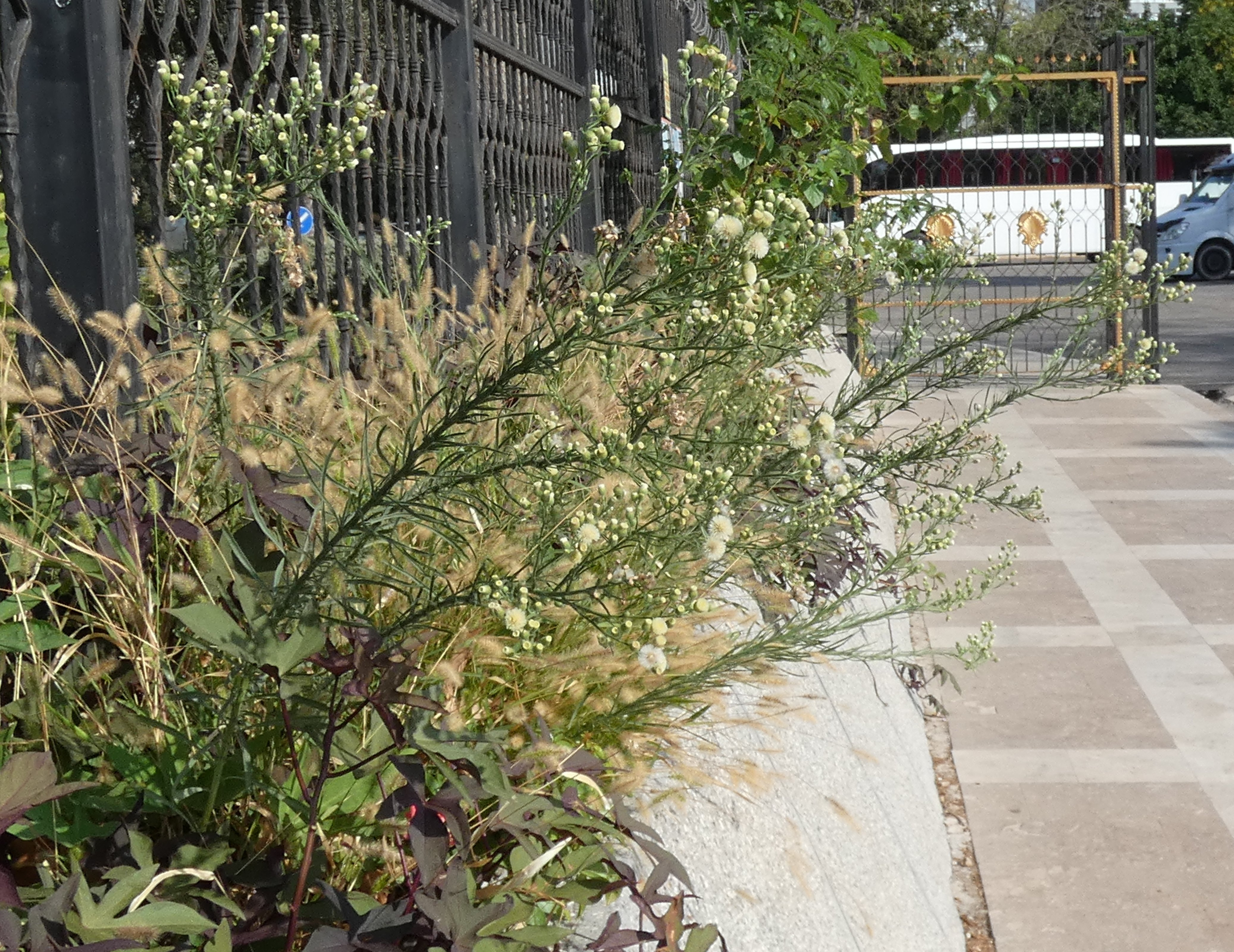

Scientific classification
- Kingdom: Plantae
- Clade: Embryophytes
- Clade: Tracheophytes
- Clade: Angiosperms
- Clade: Eudicots
- Clade: Asterids
- Order: Asterales
- Family: Asteraceae
- Genus: Erigeron
- Species: E. bonariensis

Binomial name
- Erigeron bonariensis L.
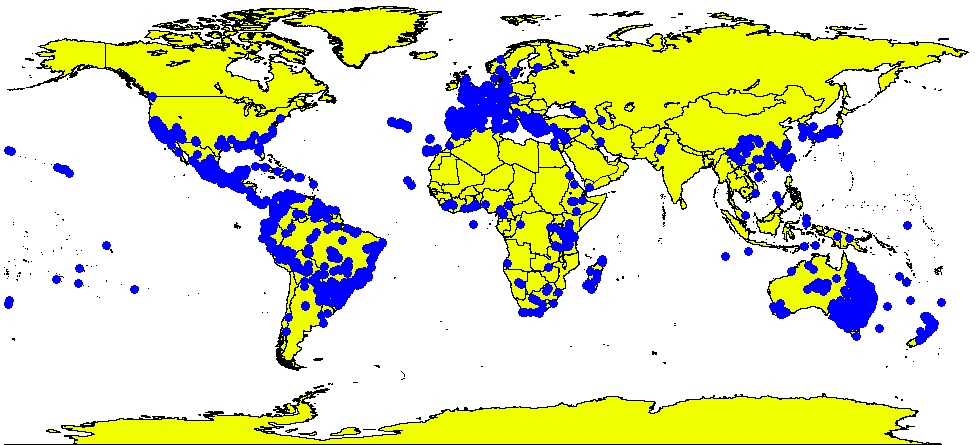
- Occurrence data from GBIF

Synonyms
- Synonymy: Erigeron bonariense L.; Conyza bonariensis (L.) Cronquist; Leptilon bonariense (L.) Small; Marsea bonariensis (L.) V.M. Badillo; Aster ambiguus (DC.) E.H.L.Krause; Conyza ambigua DC.; Conyza chenopodioides DC.; Conyza crispa] (Pourret) Rupr.; Conyza crispa (Pourr.) Cout.; Conyza gracilis Hoffmanns. & Link; Conyza hispida Kunth; Conyza ivifolia Burm.f. 1768; Conyza ivifolia (L.) Less. 1831; Conyza leucodasys Miq.; Conyza linearis DC.; Conyza linifolia (Willd.) Täckh. 1956 not L. 1753; Conyza plebeja Phil.; Conyza rufescens Hoffmanns. & Link; Conyza sinuata Elliott; Conyza sordescens Cabrera; Conyzella linifolia (Willd.) Greene; Dimorphanthes ambigua C.Presl; Dimorphanthes angustifolia Cass.; Dimorphanthes crispa Rupr.; Dimorphanthes hispida (Kunth) Cass.; Dimorphanthes linifolia (Willd.) Rupr.; Erigeron ambiguus (DC.) Sch.Bip. 1845 not Nutt. 1818; Erigeron canadensis Ten. 1831 not L. 1753; Erigeron contortus Desf. ex Pers1; Erigeron coranopifolius Willk. & Lange; Erigeron crispus Pourr.; Erigeron gusalakensis Rech.f. & Edelb.; Erigeron linearifolius Cav; Erigeron linifolius Willd.; Erigeron looseri Herter; Erigeron naudinii (Bonnet) Bonnier; Erigeron sordidus Gillies ex Hook. & Arn.; Erigeron transsilvanicus Schur; Erigeron undulatus Moench; Eschenbachia ambigua Moris; Eupatorium dictyophyllum DC.; Leptilon linifolium (Willd.) Small; Pulicaria gracilis (Hoffmanns. & Link) Nyman; Pulicaria rufescens (Hoffmanns. & Link) Nyman

= Erigeron bonariensis =

Species of flowering plant in the daisy family

Erigeron bonariensis is a species in the family Asteraceae, found throughout the tropics and subtropics as a pioneer plant; its precise origin is unknown, but most likely it stems from Central America or South America. It has become naturalized in many other regions, including North America, Europe and Australia.

Common names of E. bonariensis include flax-leaf fleabane, wavy-leaf fleabane, Argentine fleabane, hairy horseweed, asthma weed and hairy fleabane.

== Description ==
Erigeron bonariensis grows up to 75 cm (29.5 in) in height and its leaves are covered with stiff hairs, including long hairs near the apex of the bracts. Its flower heads have white ray florets and yellow disc florets. It can easily be confused with Erigeron canadensis, which grows taller, and E. sumatrensis.

It flowers in August and continues fruiting until the first frosts. It is instantly recognisable by its blue-green foliage, very narrow, undulate stem-leaves, and purple-tipped involucral bracts. It reproduces only by seed, which are easily blown and spread by wind.

== Distribution and habitat ==
Erigeron bonariensis is found throughout the tropics and subtropics as a pioneer plant; its precise origin is unknown, but most likely it stems from Central America or South America. It has become naturalized in many other regions, including North America, Europe and Australia.

E. bonariensis is a rare alien in southeastern England, found along walls and in cracks in pavements and concrete driveways. It is widespread throughout Australia, where it thrives on roadsides, fallows, pastures, gardens, lawns, footpaths, parks, riparian vegetation, forest and wetland perimeters, waste dumps and disturbed grounds.

== Photographic description ==
=== Dry summer form ===
- The following are bright dry summer first-year forms; in contrast to shady damp winter forms that follow.
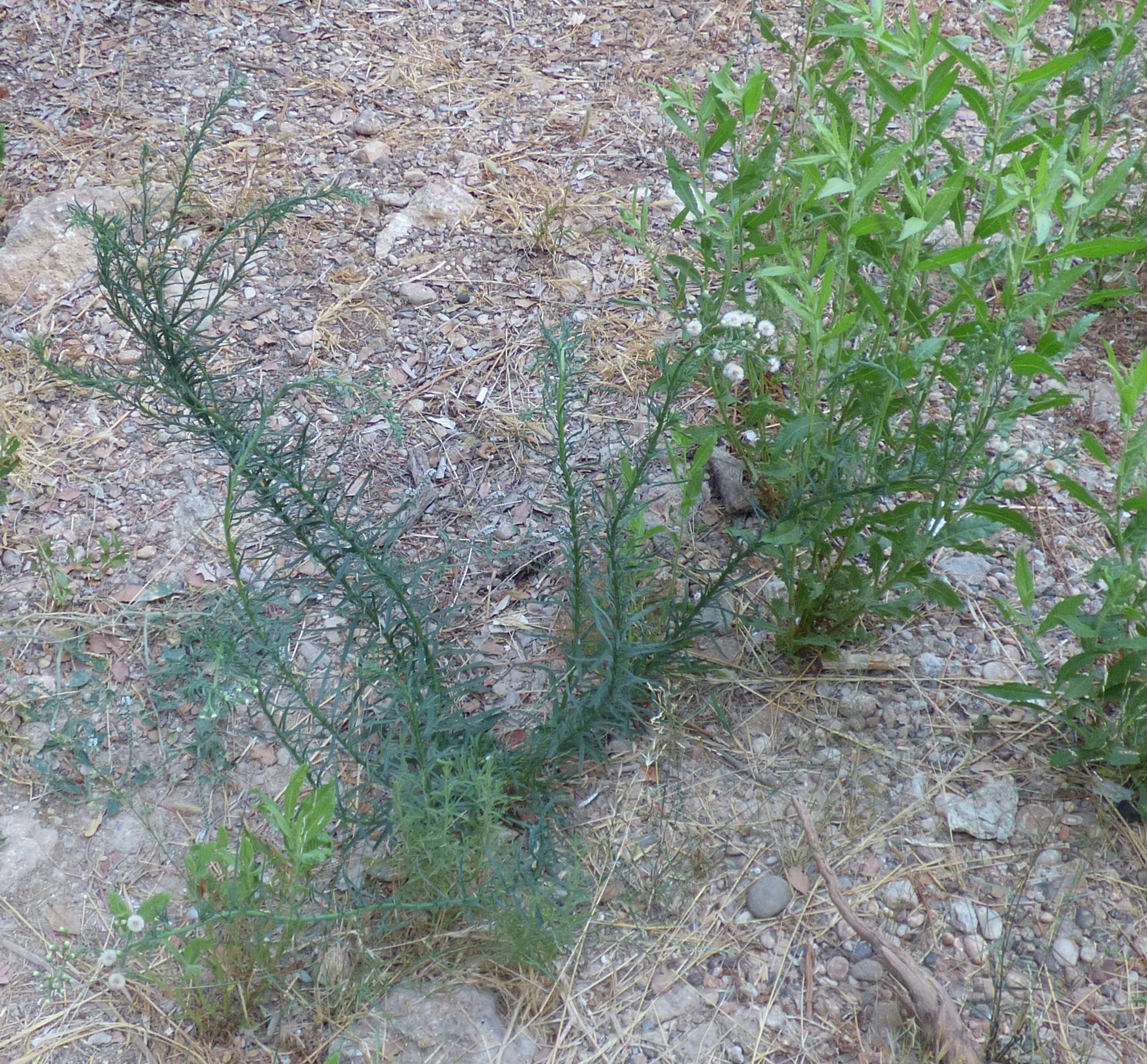
General view

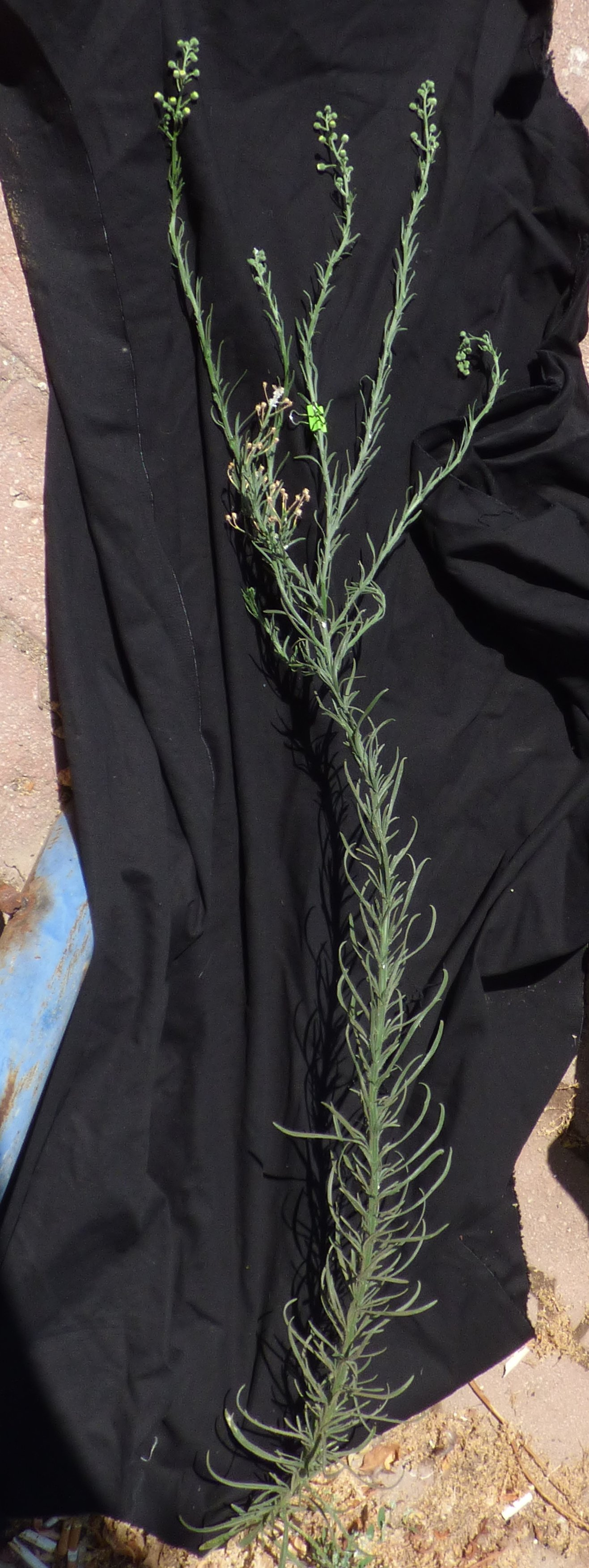
Top-heavy greyish gangly look with initial central inflorescence subsequently overtopped by some side ones

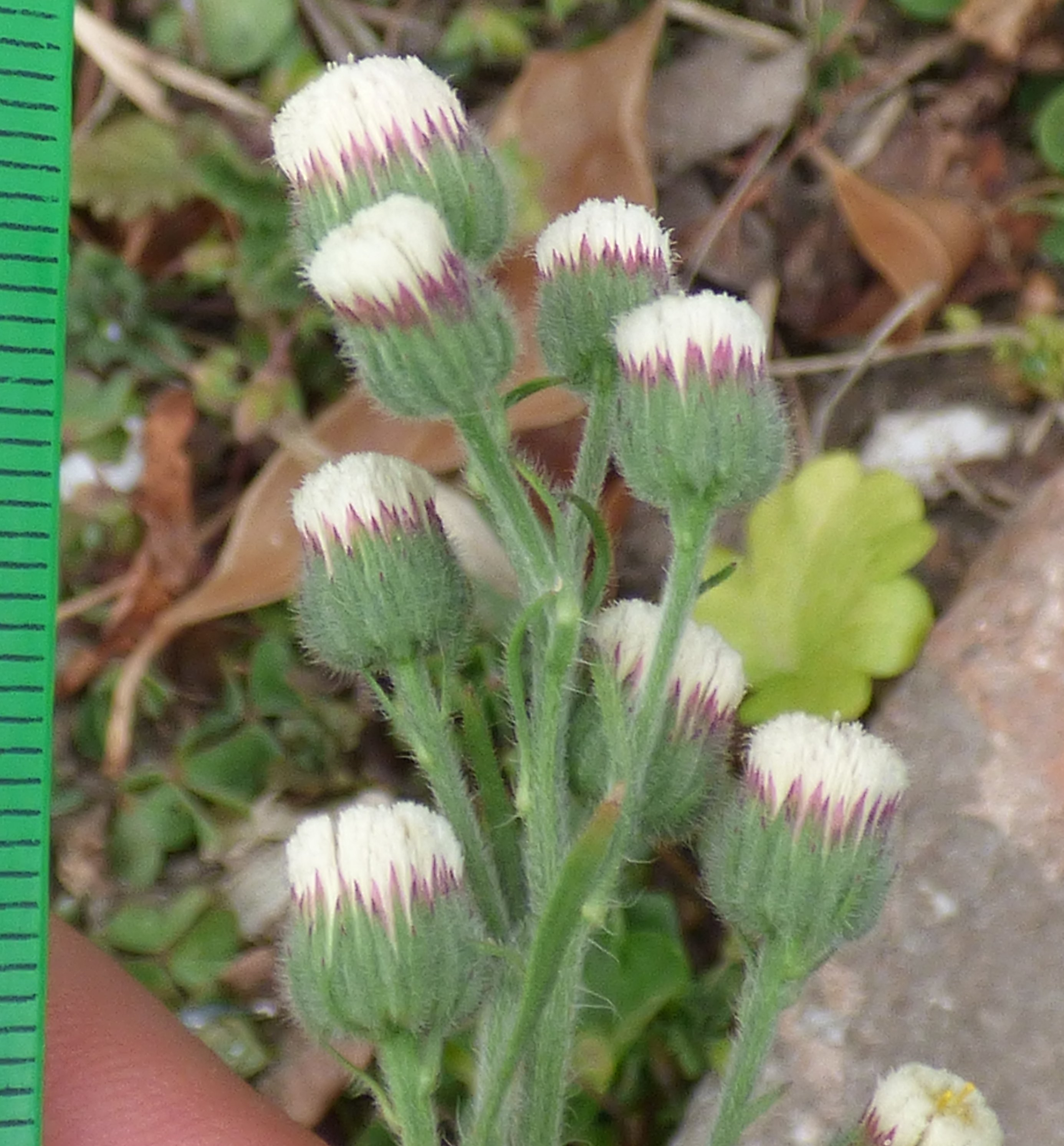
Broad heads (may be narrower especially in winter) usually with reddened tips

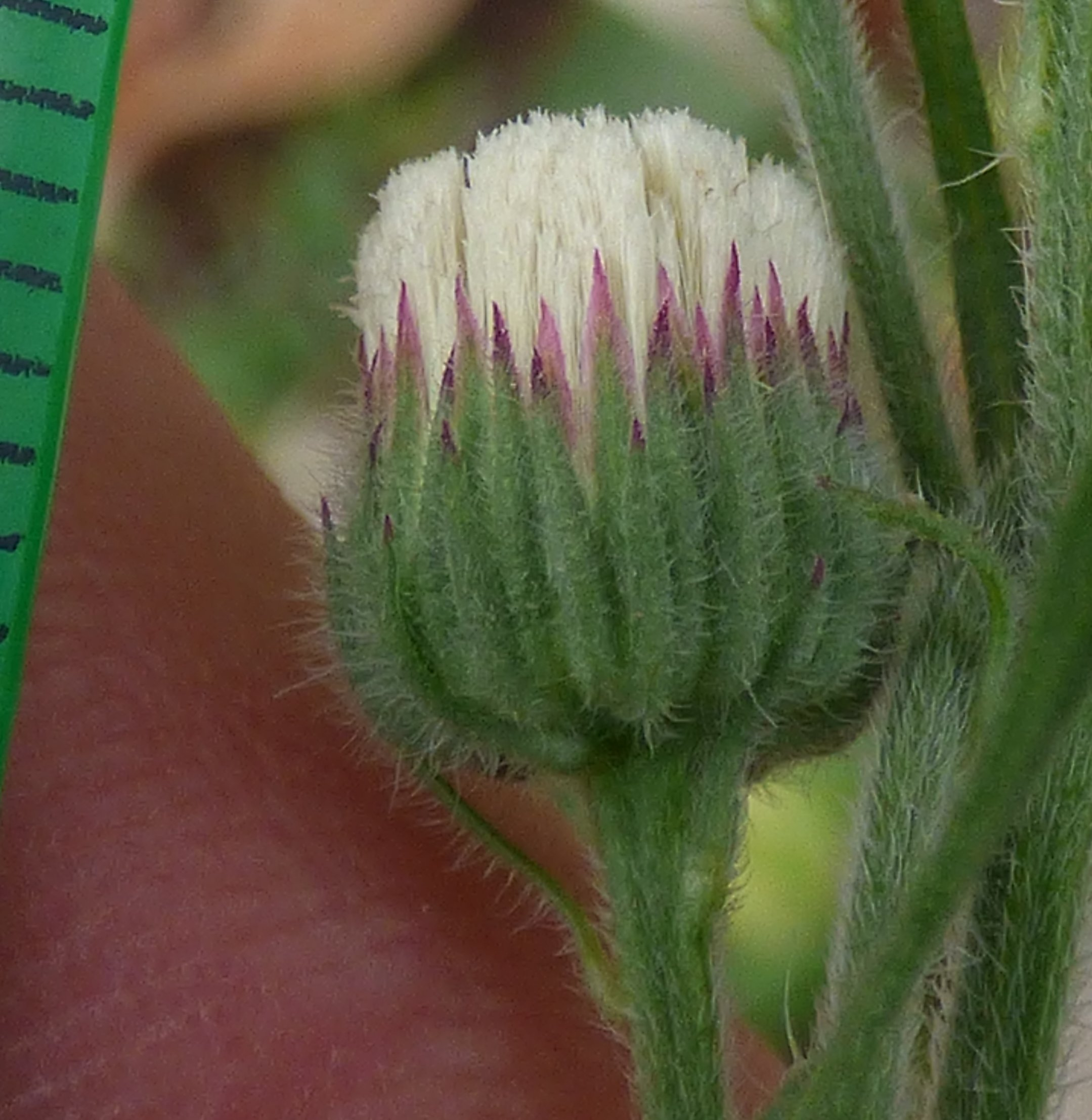
Head close up

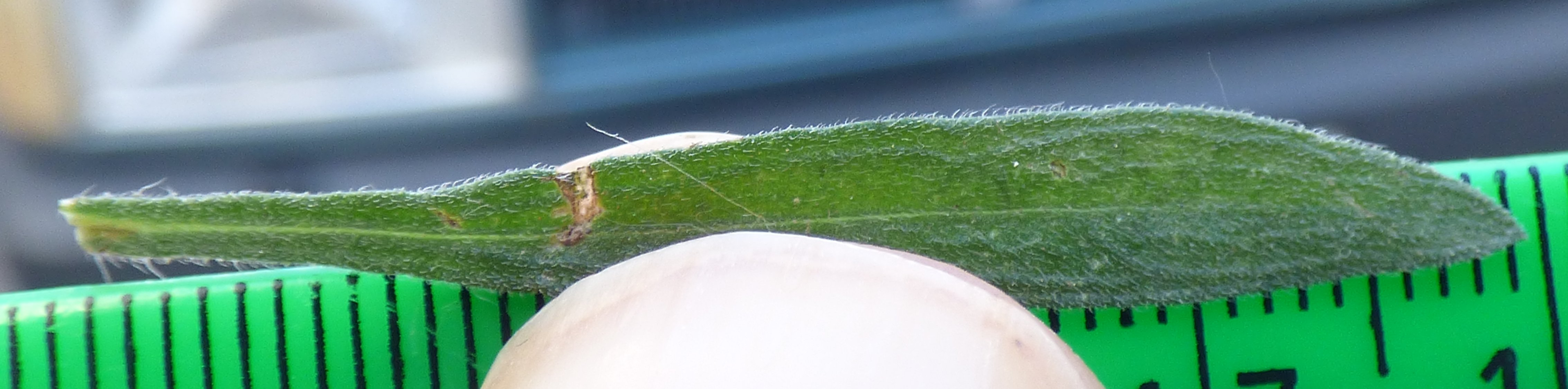
Leaf narrow showing hairs

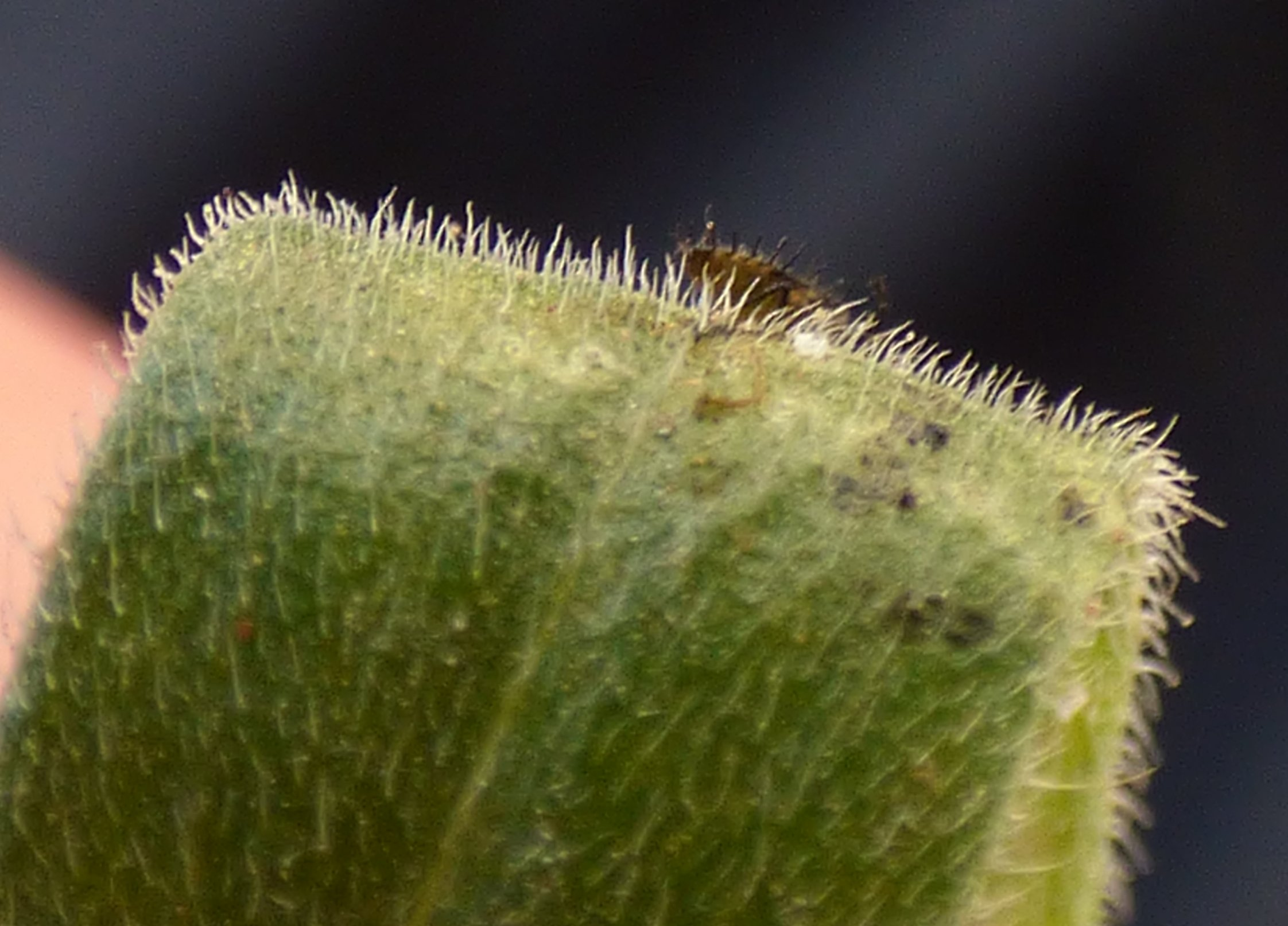
Leaf surface hairs (similar underside), sometimes poorly hairy

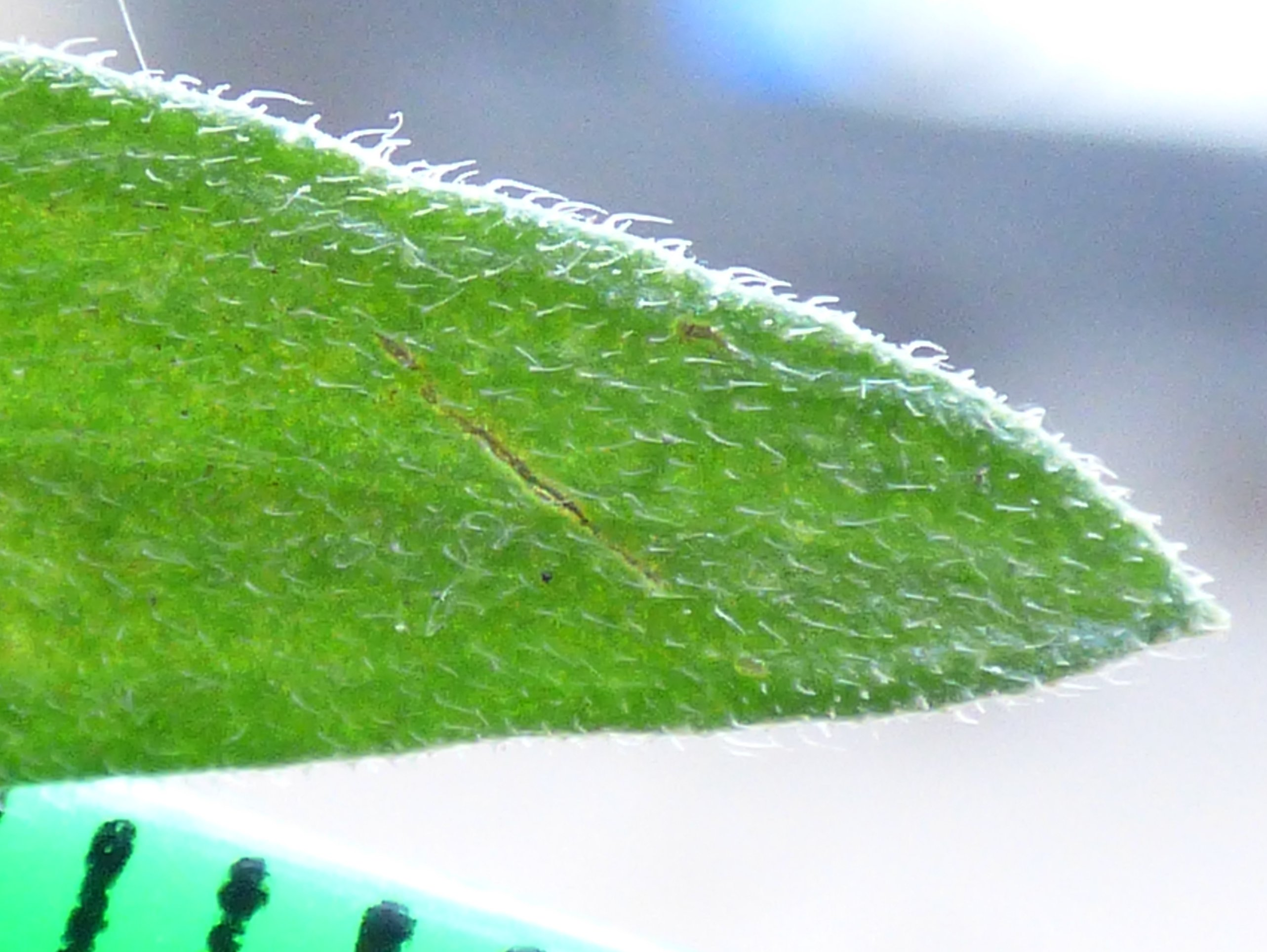
Hairs at leaf tip

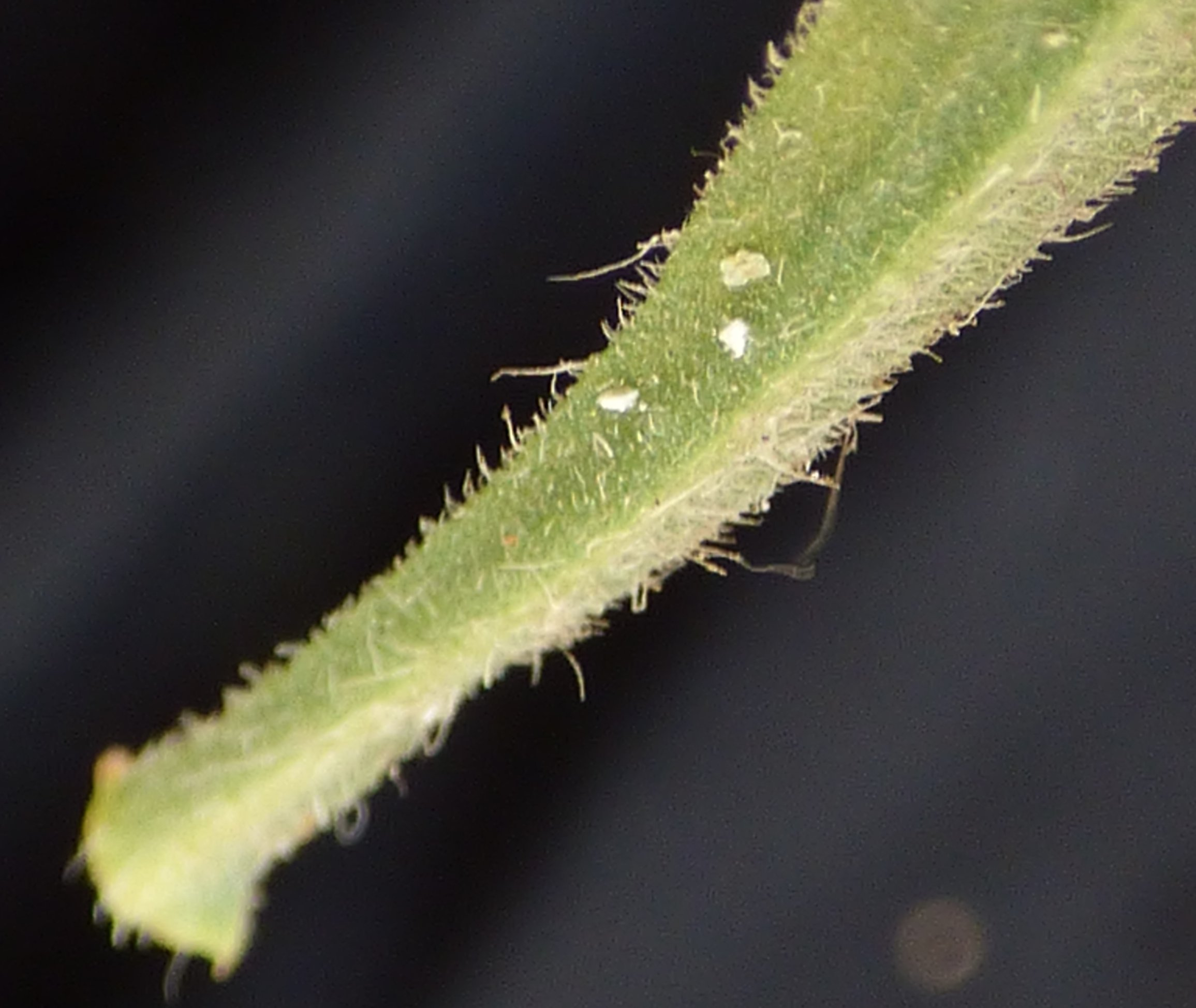
Leaf base hairs (a few long ones usually present) and underside hairs

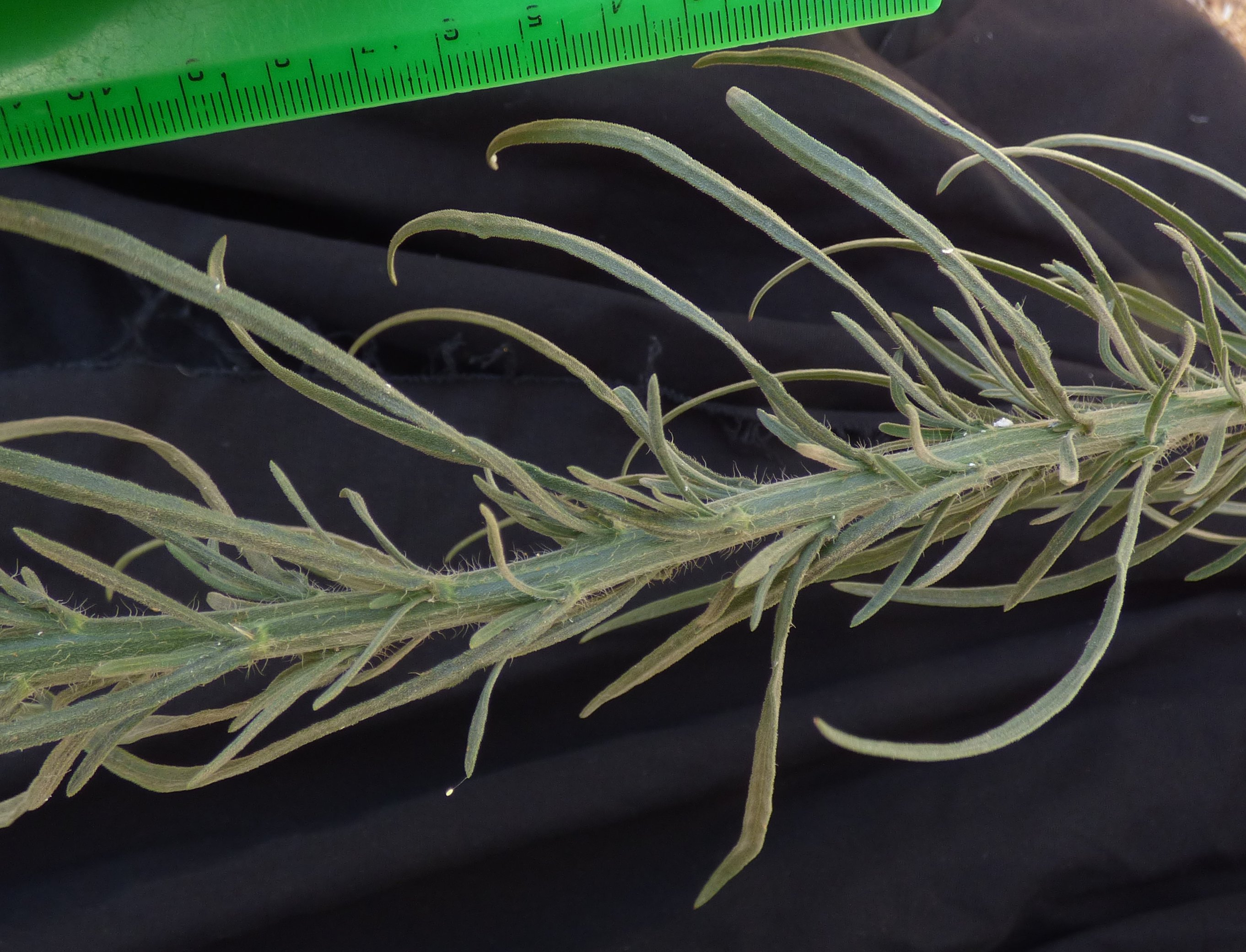
Stem leaves of robust stems multi-lengthed, grey (sometimes green)

=== Winter, damp, shady, biennial forms ===
- Showing diffusely branched or strangled appearances with small flower heads
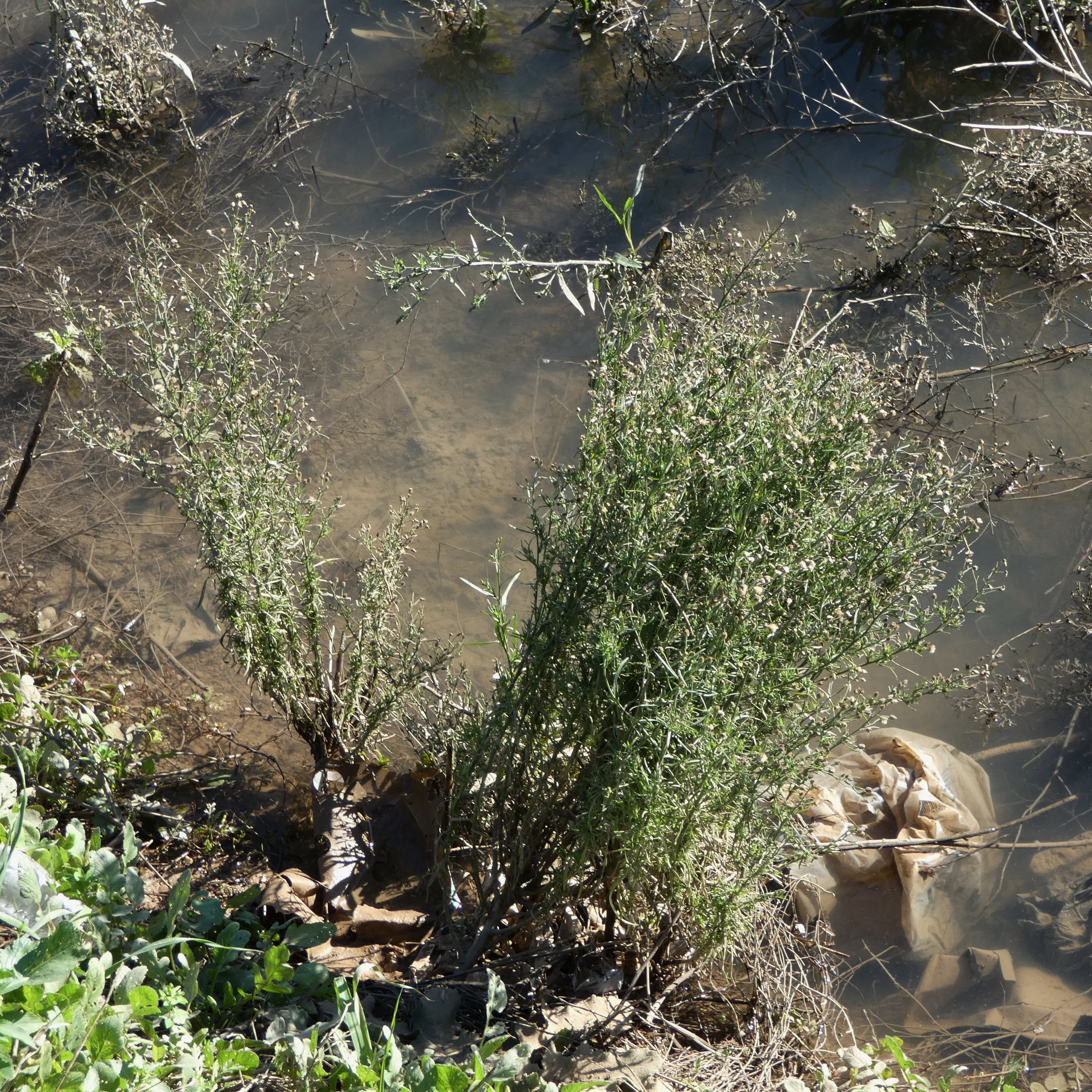
Winter form near water in the open

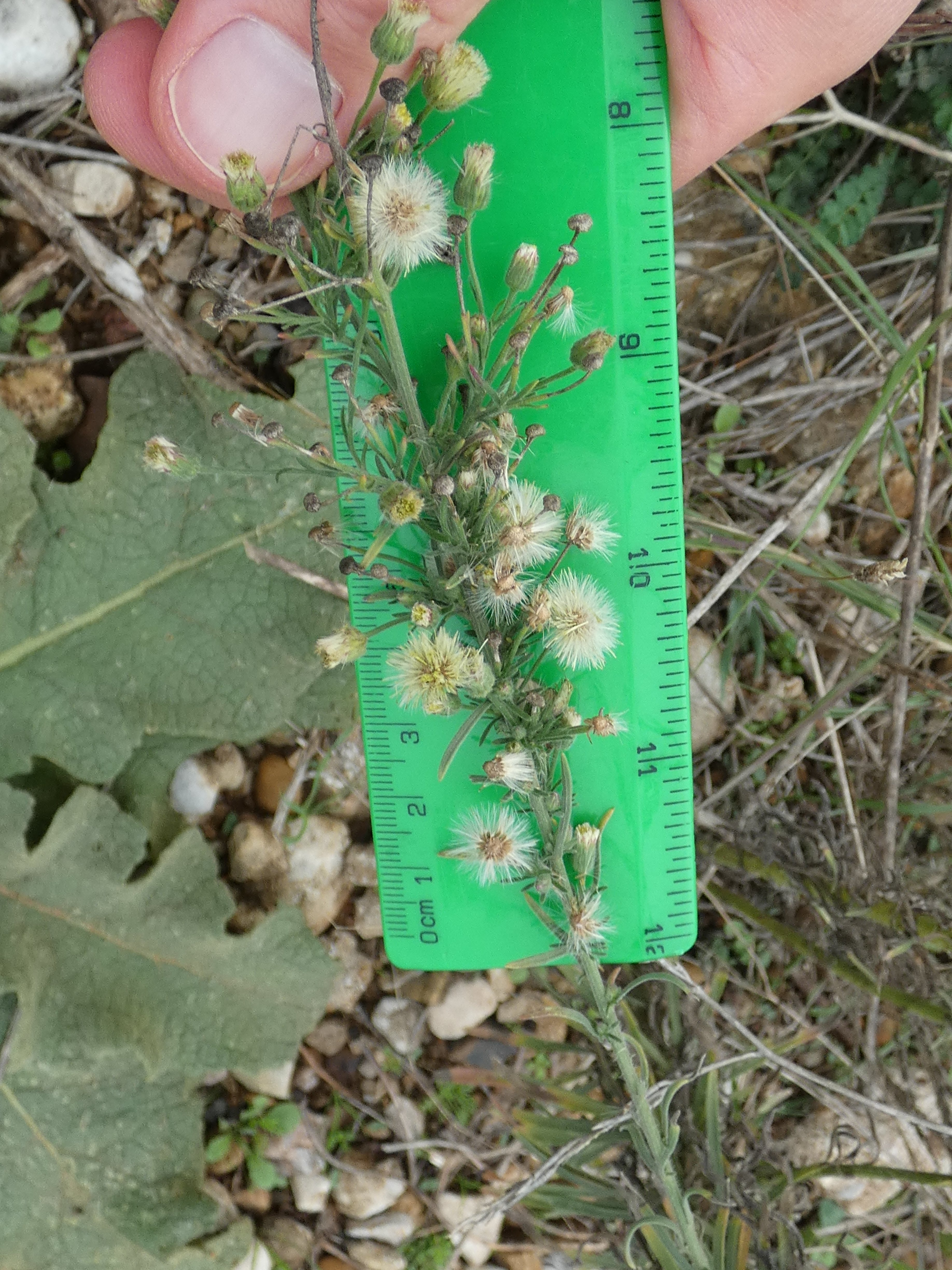
Strangled winter form in the open

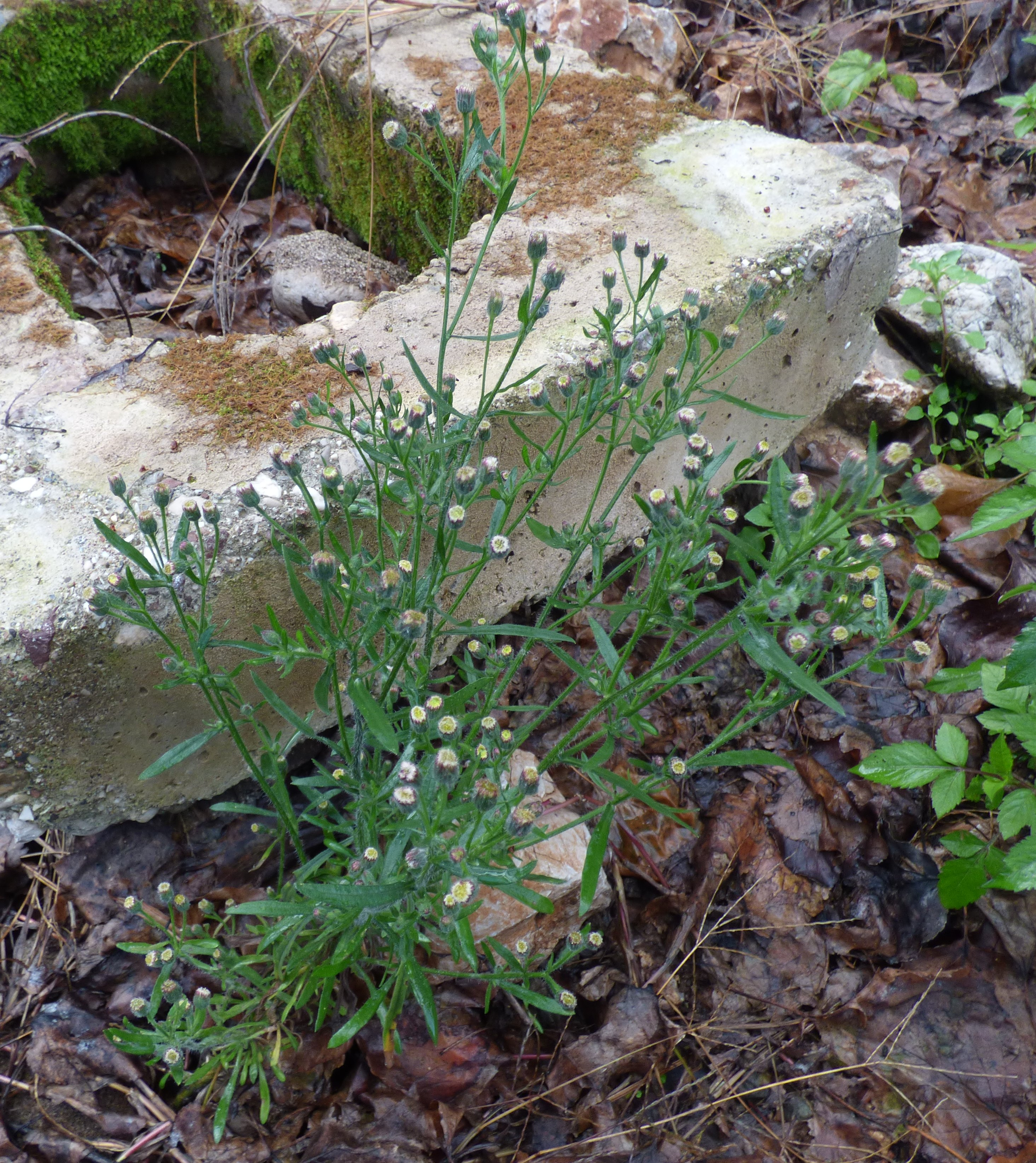
Winter form in damp shade

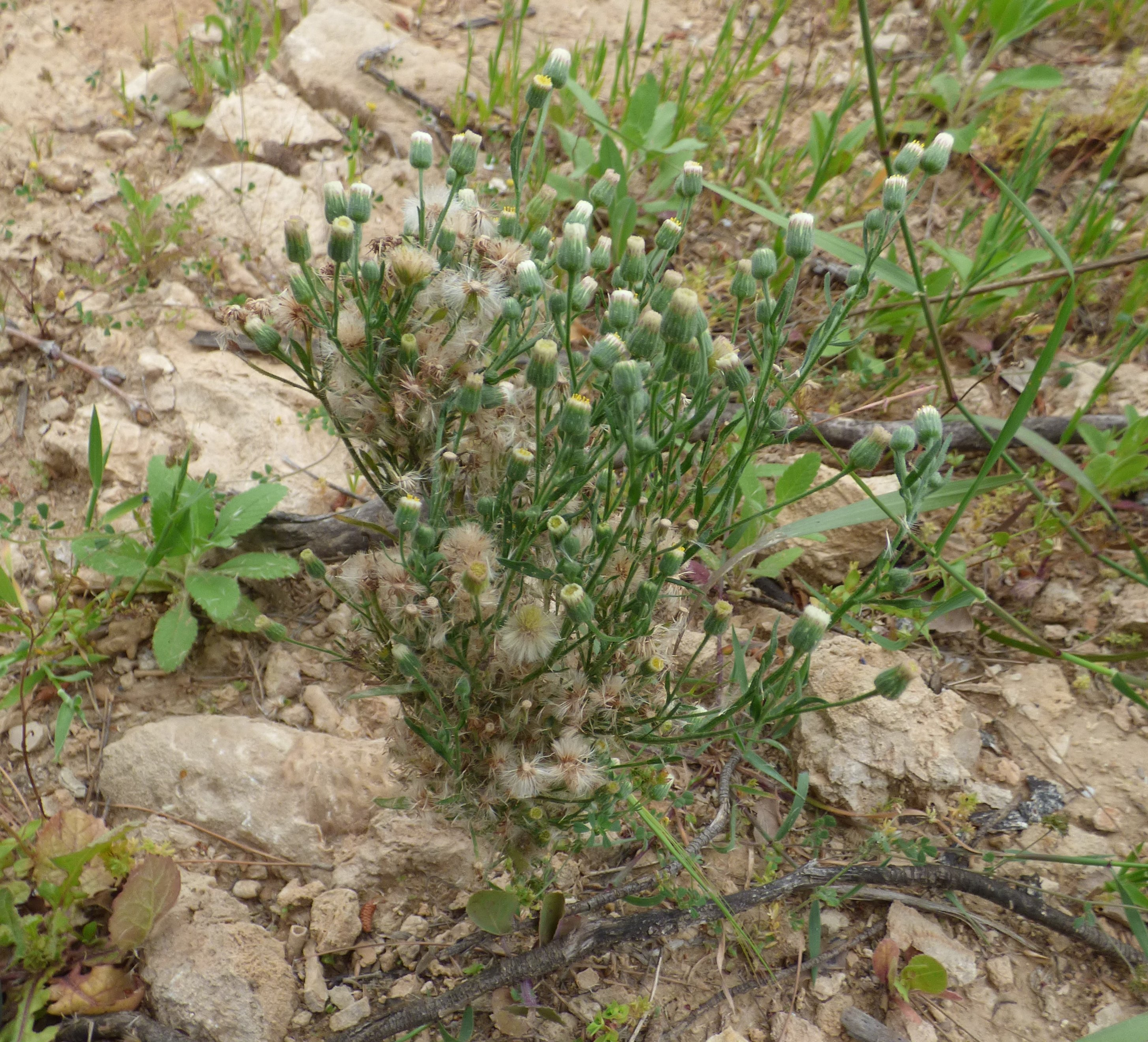
From a biennial form

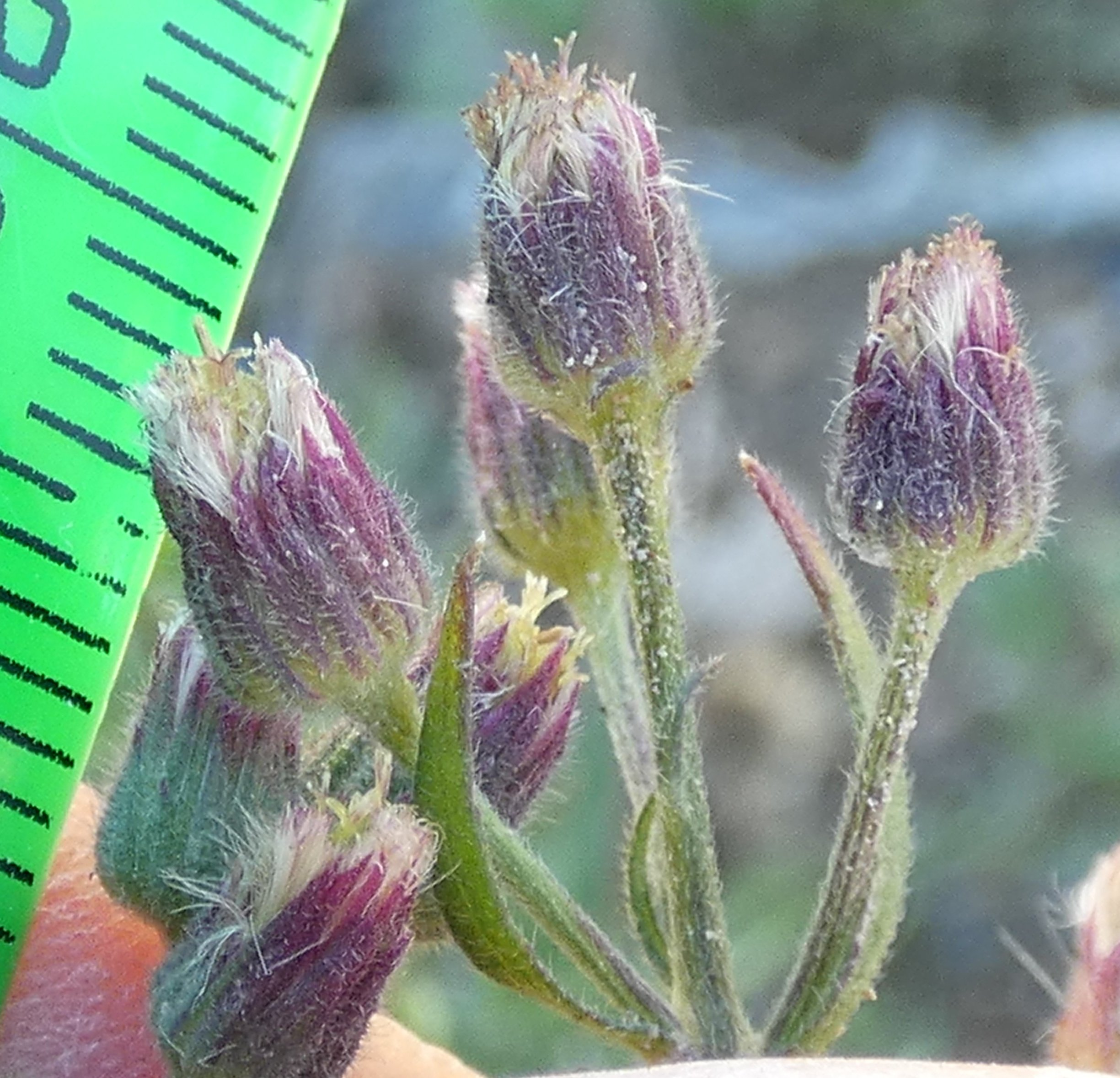
May have particularly reddened heads

=== Other photos ===
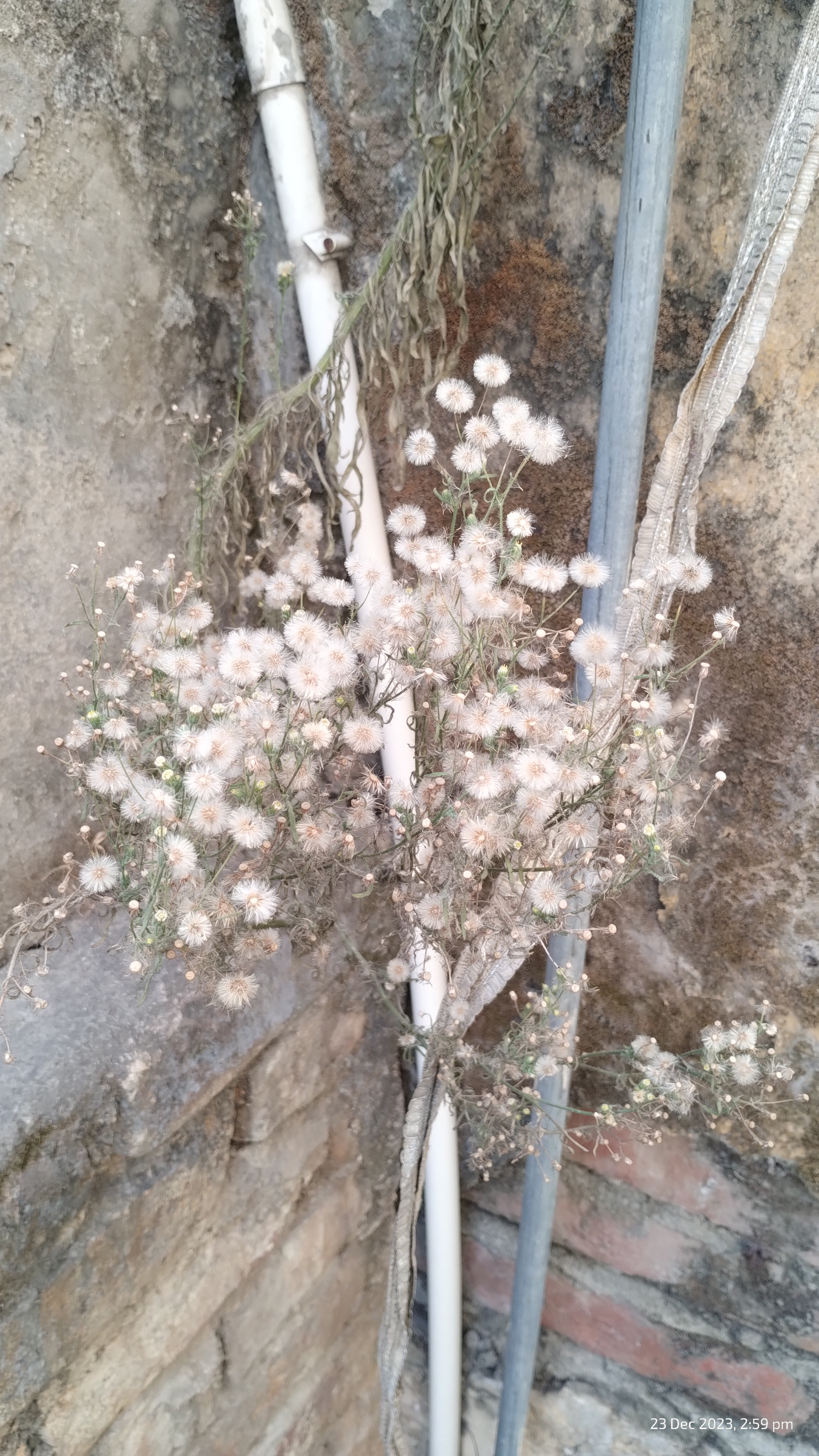
Erigeron bonariensis growing as a weed on a building in New Delhi, India

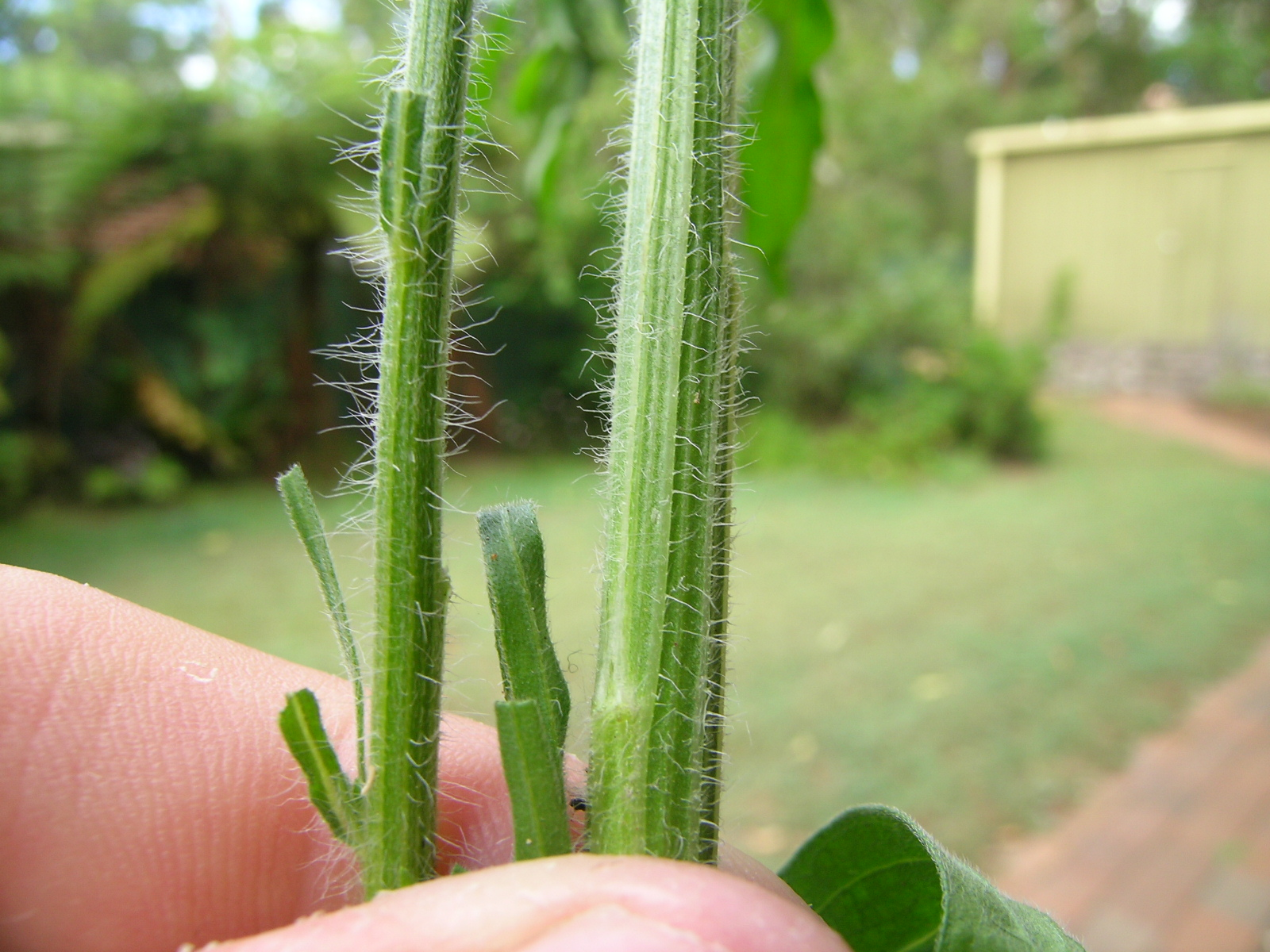
Stiff hairs cover the plant.

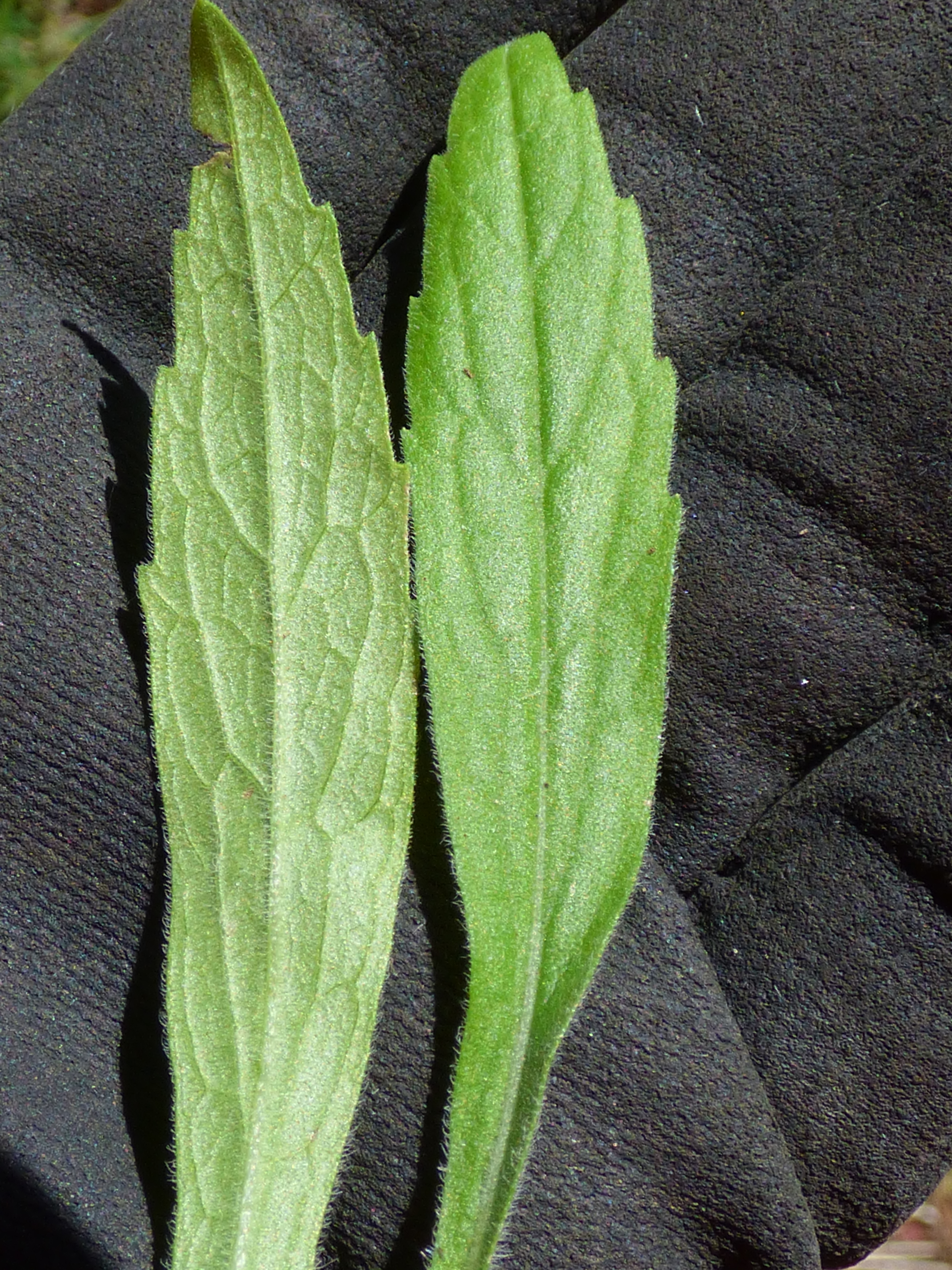
Basal rosette leaves, before plant matures and flowers, Maui, Hawaii

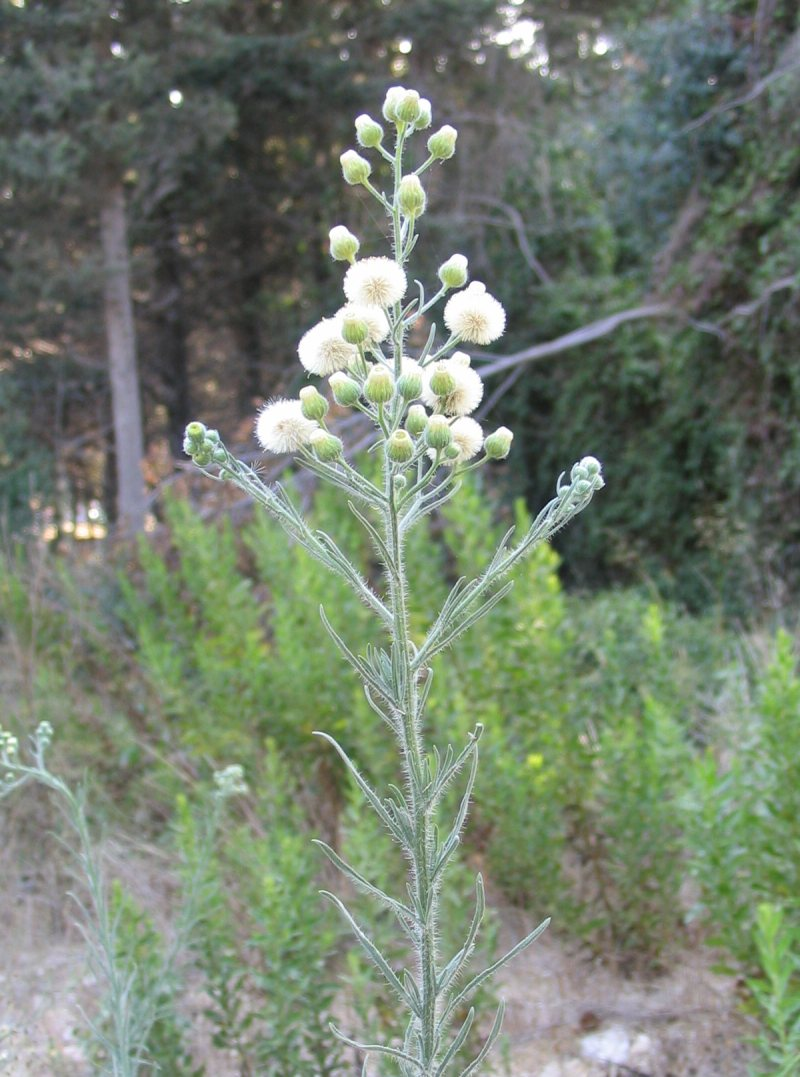
Foliage becomes grey-green in dry-summer regions, such as Israel

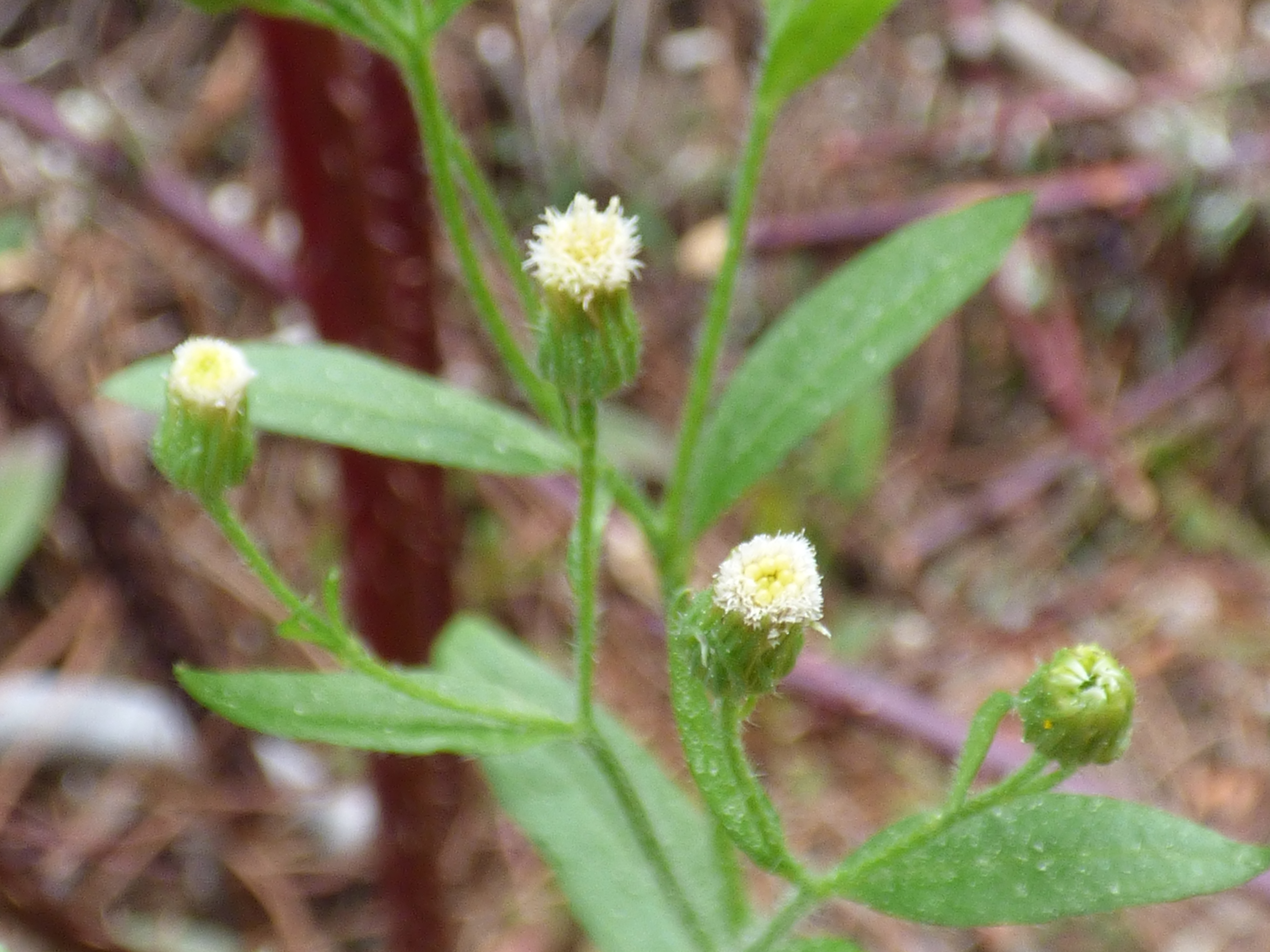
White ray flowers and yellow disc flowers in fully "open" flower heads, Maui, Hawaii

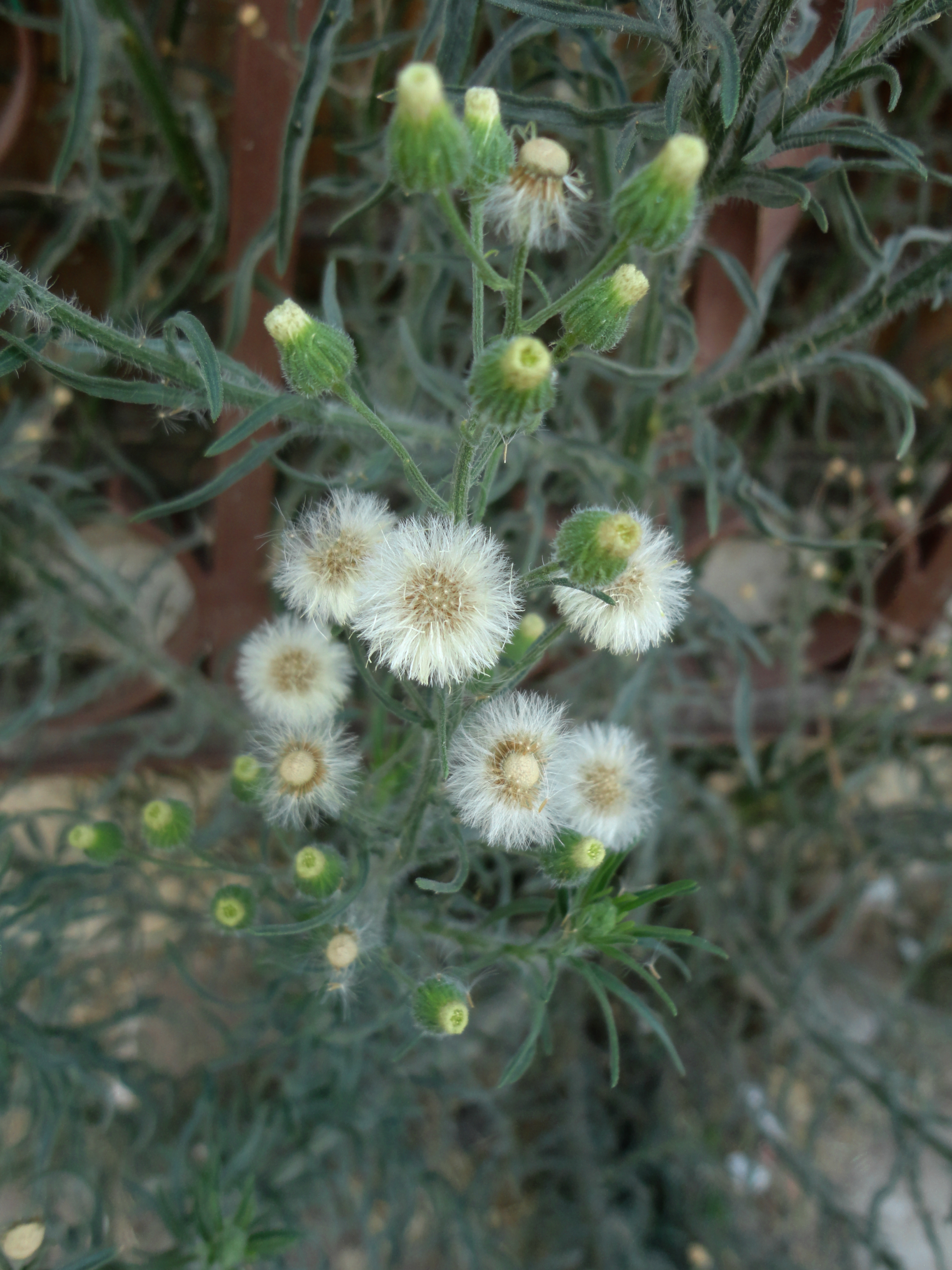
Flower heads are followed by seeds, which are easily carried by the wind.
