= Common possum =

- Common brushtail possum
- Common ringtail possum
- Common opossum
- Common brushtail possum in New Zealand

== See also ==
- List of common household pests
