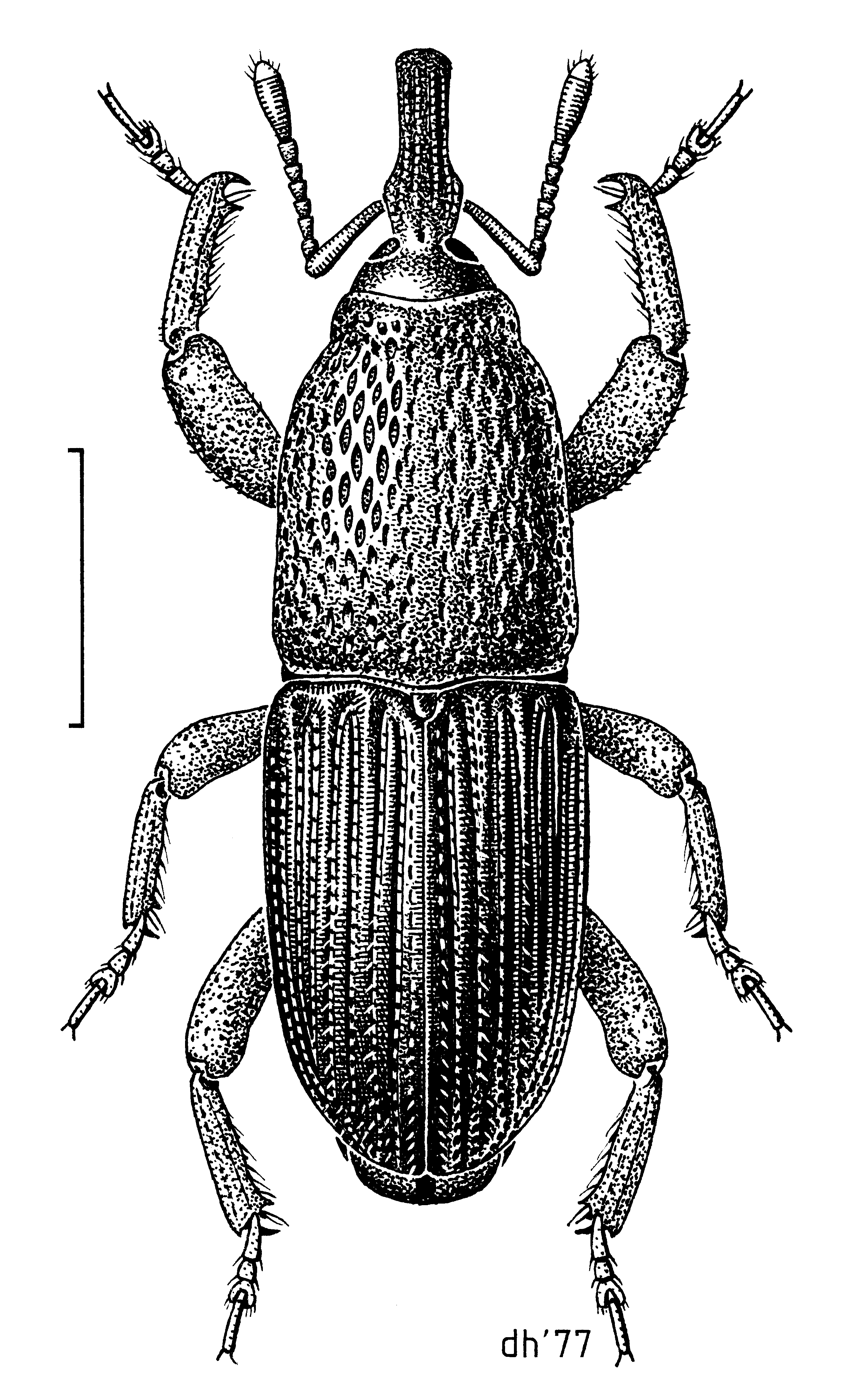
- Illustration by Des Helmore

Scientific classification
- Kingdom: Animalia
- Phylum: Arthropoda
- Class: Insecta
- Order: Coleoptera
- Suborder: Polyphaga
- Infraorder: Cucujiformia
- Family: Curculionidae
- Subfamily: Dryophthorinae
- Tribe: Litosomini
- Genus: Sitophilus
- Species: S. granarius

Binomial name
- Sitophilus granarius (Linnaeus, 1758)

Synonyms
- Calandra frumentarius Stephens, 1829; Calandra granaria (Clairville and Schellenberg, 1798); Calandra laevicosta Philippi and Philippi, 1864; Calandra remotepunctata (Gyllenhaal, 1838); Calandra remotepunctatus (Gyllenhaal, 1838); Cordyle granarius (Thunberg, 1815); Curculio granarius Linnaeus, 1758; Curculio pulicarius Panzer, 1798; Curculio segetis Linnaeus, 1758; Curculio unicolor Marsham, 1802; Rhynchaenus segetis (Latreille, 1804); Rhynchophorus granarius (Herbst, 1795); Sitophilus remotepunctatus (Gyllenhaal, 1838)

= Wheat weevil =

Species of beetle

The wheat weevil (Sitophilus granarius), also known as the grain weevil or granary weevil, is an insect that feeds on cereal grains, and is a common pest in a significant part of the world. It can cause significant damage to harvested stored grains, and may drastically decrease crop yields. The females lay many eggs, and the larvae eat the inside of the grain kernels.

== Identification ==
Adult wheat weevils are about 3–5 mm (0.12–0.20 in) long, with elongated snouts and chewing mouth parts. Depending on the grain kernels, the size of the weevil varies. In small grains, such as millet or grain sorghum, they are small in size, but in maize (corn), they are larger. The adults are a reddish-brown colour and lack distinguishing marks. Adult wheat weevils are not capable of flight. Larvae are legless, humpbacked, and are white with a tan head. Weevils in the pupal stage have snouts similar to those of adults.

== Natural history ==
=== Life cycle ===
Female wheat weevils lay between 36 and 254 eggs; usually, one egg is deposited in each grain kernel. All larval stages and the pupal stage occur within the grain. The larvae feed inside the grain until pupation, after which they bore a hole out of the grain and emerge. They are rarely seen outside of the grain kernel. The life cycle takes about five weeks in the summer, but may take up to 20 weeks in cooler temperatures. Adults can live up to eight months after emerging.

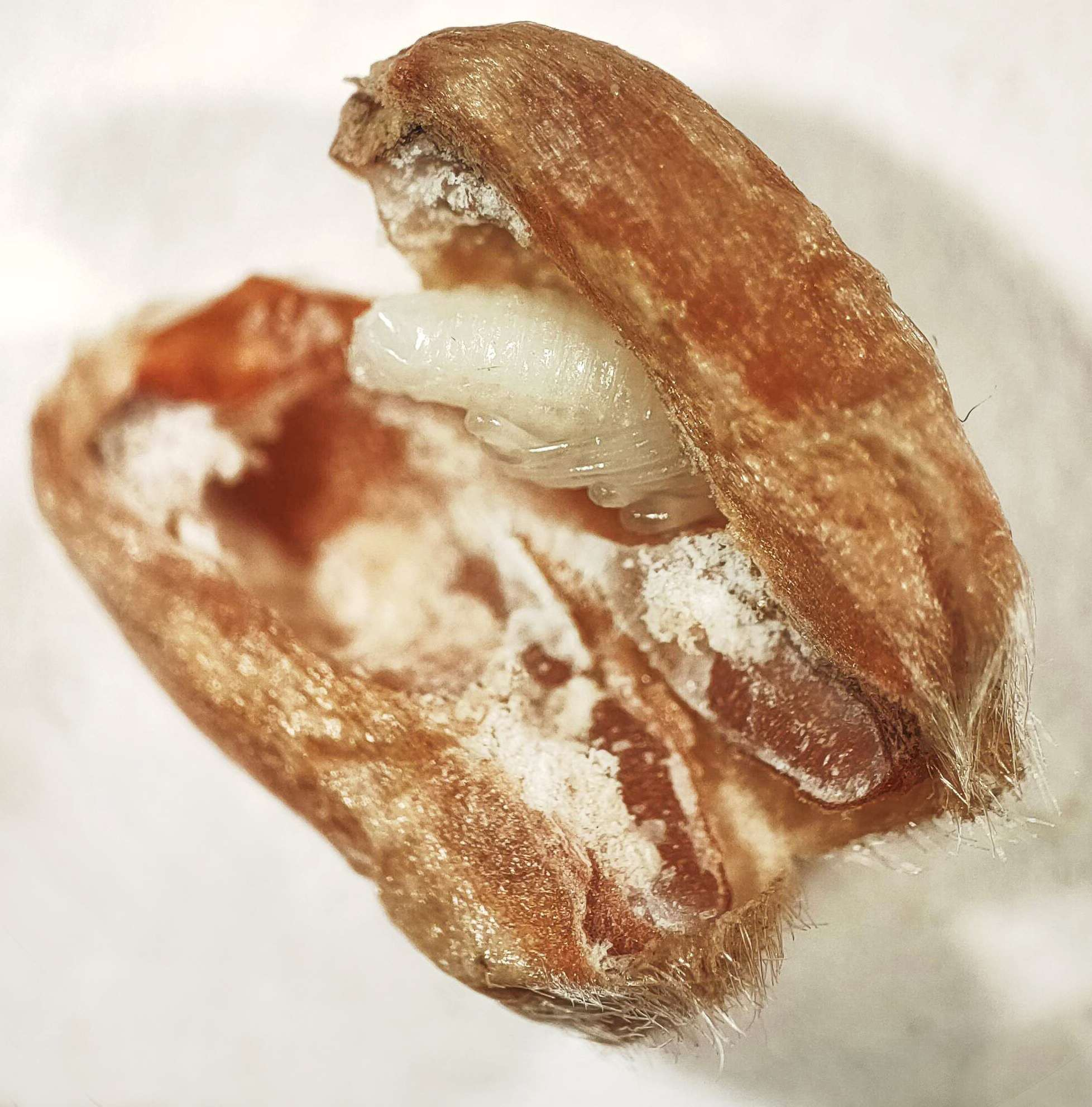
Pupa inside a wheat kernel

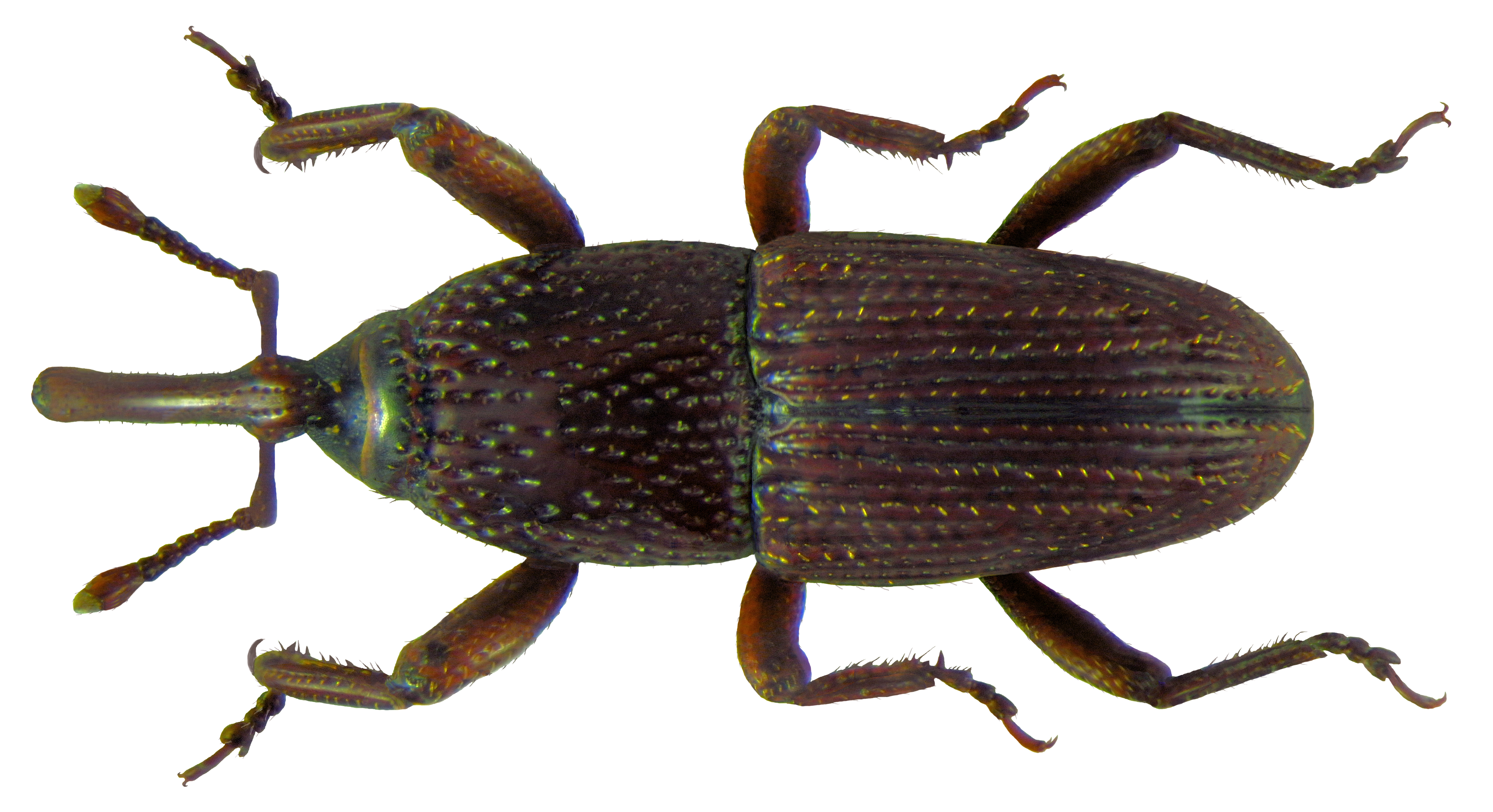
Adult, dorsal view

=== Behavior ===
When threatened or disturbed, adult wheat weevils will pull their legs close to their bodies and feign death. Female weevils can tell if a grain kernel has had an egg laid in it by another weevil. They avoid laying another egg in this grain. Females chew a hole, deposit an egg, and seal the hole with a gelatinous secretion. This may be how other females know the grain has an egg in it already. This ensures the young will survive and produce another generation. One pair of weevils may produce up to 6,000 offspring per year.

The species is not found "in the wild", but only in human food-storage situations.

== Human impact ==
Wheat weevils are pests of stores of grains of the cereal crops wheat, oats, rye, barley, rice and maize. Unfortunately the impact of wheat weevils worldwide is unknown, because information is not well shared. It is believed to be especially bad in places where the grain harvests are not accurately measured. The weevils are hard to detect and usually all of the grain in an infested storage facility must be destroyed. Many methods have been attempted to get rid of the wheat weevil, such as pesticides, different methods of masking the odor of the grain with unpleasant scents, and some have even gone as far as introducing predator organisms.

=== Prevention and control ===
Sanitation and inspection are key to preventing infestation. Grains should be stored in preferably metallic (cardboard, even fortified, is easily drilled through by the weevil) containers with tight lids in a refrigerator or a freezer, and should be purchased in small quantities. If any suspicion has arisen, carefully examine the grains for adult insects or holes in the grain kernels. Another method is to immerse them in water. If they float to the surface, it is a good indication of infestation. Even if identified early, disposal may be the only effective solution.

== See also ==
- Lixus concavus, the rhubarb curculio weevil
- Maize weevil (Sitophilus zeamais)
- Rice weevil (Sitophilus oryzae)
