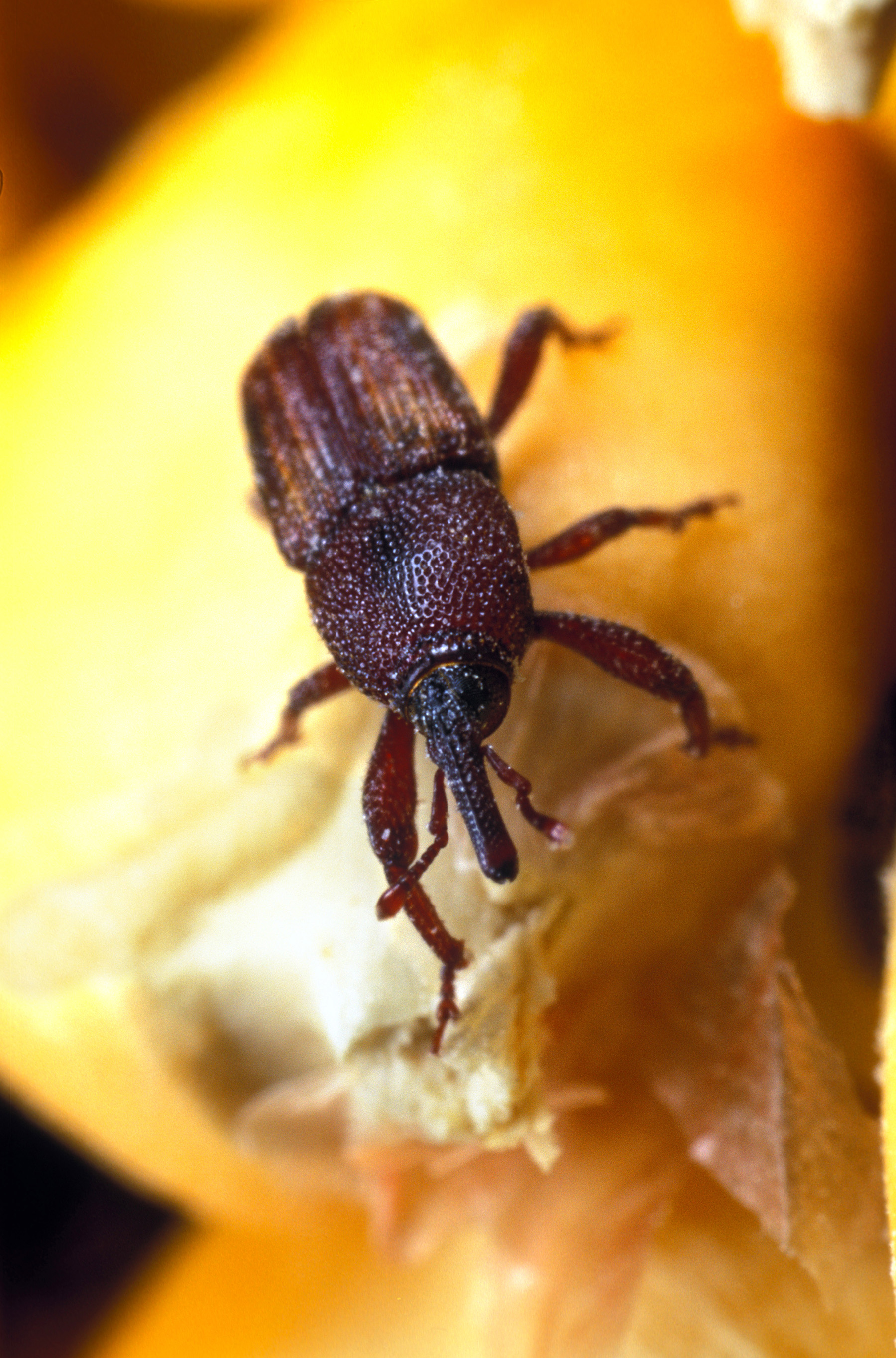

Scientific classification
- Kingdom: Animalia
- Phylum: Arthropoda
- Clade: Pancrustacea
- Class: Insecta
- Order: Coleoptera
- Suborder: Polyphaga
- Infraorder: Cucujiformia
- Superfamily: Curculionoidea
- Family: Curculionidae
- Subfamily: Dryophthorinae
- Tribe: Litosomini
- Genus: Sitophilus
- Species: S. zeamais

Binomial name
- Sitophilus zeamais (Motschulsky), 1855

Synonyms
- Calandra chilensis Philippi and Philippi, 1864; Calandra platensis Zacher, 1922; Cossonus quadrimaculata Walker, 1859

= Maize weevil =

Species of beetle

The maize weevil (Sitophilus zeamais), known in the United States as the greater rice weevil, is a species of beetle in the family Curculionidae. It can be found in numerous tropical areas around the world, and in the United States, and is a major pest of maize. This species attacks both standing crops and stored cereal products, including wheat, rice, sorghum, oats, barley, rye, buckwheat, peas, and cottonseed. The maize weevil also infests other types of stored, processed cereal products such as pasta, cassava, and various coarse, milled grains. It has even been known to attack fruit while in storage, such as apples.

== Description ==
A close relative of the rice weevil, the maize weevil has a length of 2.3 mm to 4.9 mm. The type of food consumed by the larvae influences the size of the adult (3.9-4.9 mm on corn, 3.0-4.6 mm on wheat, 2.9-4.3 mm on rice, 2.7-3.2 on rough rice, and 2.3-3.9 mm on shelled rice). This small, brown weevil has four reddish-brown spots on the wing covers (elytra). It has a long, thin snout, and geniculate (elbowed) antennae. Sitophilus zeamais appears similar to the rice weevil (Sitophilus oryzae), but has more clearly marked spots on the wing covers, and is usually somewhat larger.

The maize weevil is able to fly. It is not a very strong flyer, but can travel at least 400 metres. Peak flying activity is between 15:00 and 17:00.

The maize weevil and the rice weevil look very much alike but external features can be used to differentiate the vast majority of adults. However, the only reliable features to distinguish adults of both species are the genitalia (see table below). Both species can hybridize. The genitalic structure of hybrids is unknown.

Maize weevil (S. zeamais)	Rice weevil (S. oryzae)
Punctures on pronotal dorsum typically nearly circular, rarely elliptical	Longitudinally elliptical punctures on pronotal dorsum
Pronotal punctures are nearly equally spaced apart, and pronotum typically has no median puncture-free area (rarely has a narrow puncture-free median zone)	Pronotal punctures are separated by a flat, median, longitudinal puncture-free zone
More than 20 pronotal punctures along the approximate midline, running from neck to scutellum (not reliable for individuals not reared on corn, which are typically smaller)	Less than 20 pronotal punctures along the approximate midline, running from neck to scutellum
Scutellar elevations typically farther apart compared to their longitudinal length	Scutellar elevations typically closer together compare to their longitudinal length
Scutellar elevations typically extend longitudinally approximately halfway down the scutellum	Scutellar elevations typically extend longitudinally approximately more than halfway down the scutellum
Proepimera meets behind the fore coxae and has a barely discernible notch along the posterior edge at the site of the meeting point	Proepimera meets behind the fore coxae and along the posterior edge, has a distinct notch along the posterior edge at the site of the meeting point
Male aedeagus has two dorsal, longitudinal grooves	Male aedeagus is smooth and shiny on the dorsal surface
Epipharyngeal rods of larvae tapering apically	Epipharyngeal rods of larvae have virtually the same width throughout
Lateral lobes of Y-shaped sclerite of female genitalia tapering and pointed at apex	Lateral lobes of Y-shaped sclerite of female genitalia not tapering and rounded at apex
More than 5 sensory organs at the tip of the labial palps of larvae	Less than 5 sensory organs at the tip of the labial palps of larvae

== Distribution ==
S. zeamais occurs throughout warm, humid regions around the world, especially in locations where maize is grown, including: Polynesia, Brazil, Argentina, Burma, Cambodia, Greece, Japan, Morocco, Spain, Syria, Turkey, United States, former countries of the USSR, Sub Saharan Africa and former countries of Yugoslavia. It is also widely distributed throughout agricultural areas of northern Australia. This species has also been recorded in Canada, in the provinces of Ontario and Quebec, and has been intercepted at ports, but is not well established there. It has, however, been present for several years in Montreal, where grain from the U.S. is stored.

== Life cycle ==
The complete development time for the life cycle of this species averages 36 days. The female chews through the surface of the grain, creating a hole. She then deposits a small oval white egg, and covers the hole as the ovipositor is removed, with a waxy secretion that creates a plug. The plug quickly hardens, and leaves a small raised area on the seed surface. This provides the only visible evidence that the kernel is infested. Only one egg is laid inside each grain. When the egg hatches into a white, legless grub, it will remain inside and begin feeding on the grain. The larvae will pupate while inside, then chew a circular exit hole, and emerge as an adult beetle. A single female may lay 300 to 400 eggs during her lifetime. Adults can live for 5 to 8 months. Breeding conditions require temperatures between 15 and 34 °C (59 and 93 °F) and 40% relative humidity.

When the adults emerge, the females move to a high surface and release sex pheromones. Males are then attracted to this pheromone.

== Host range ==
The maize weevil commonly attacks standing crops, in particular, maize before harvest, and is also commonly associated with rice. It infests raw or processed cereals such as wheat, oats, barley, sorghum, rye and buckwheat. It can breed in crops with a moisture content of a much wider range than S. oryzae, and has been found in fruit, such as apples during storage. Although the maize weevil cannot readily breed in finely processed grains, it can easily breed in products such as macaroni and noodles, and milled cereals that have been exposed to excessive moisture.

== Damage and detection ==
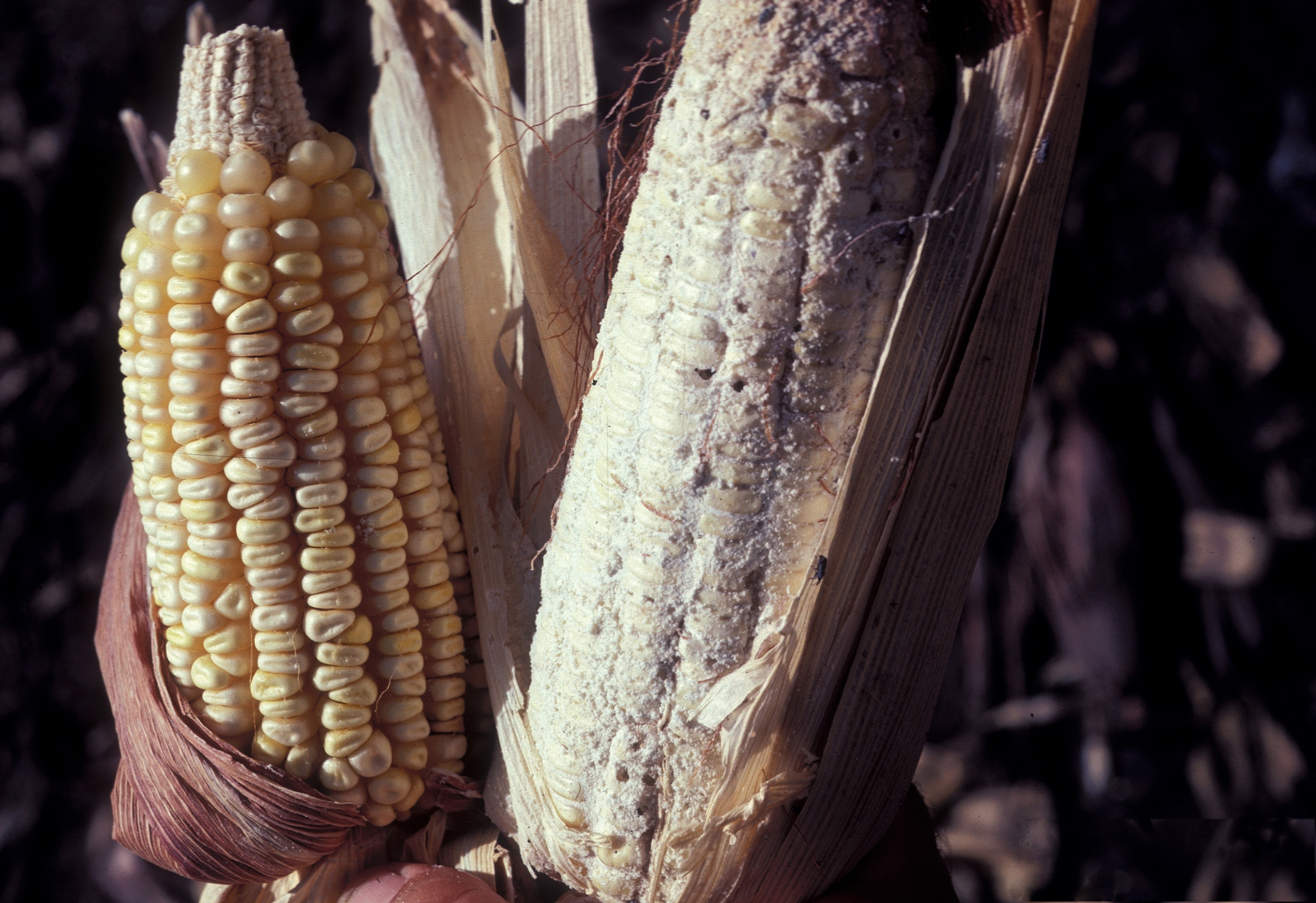
Maize damaged by maize weevil larvae

Early detection of infestation is difficult. As S. zeamais larvae feed on the interior of individual grains, often leaving only the hulls, a flour-like grain dust, mixed with frass is evident. Infested grains contain holes through which adults have emerged. A possible indication of infestation is grain, when placed in water, floating to the surface. Ragged holes in individual grains, similar to damage caused by the rice weevil and granary weevil, may indicate infestation. In large stores of grain, an increase in temperature may be detected. The most obvious sign of infestation is the emergence of adults. One study recorded, 5 weeks after infestation, the emergence of 100 adults per kg per day.

== See also ==
- Granary weevil, also known as the wheat weevil (S. granarius)
- Rice weevil (S. oryzae)
- Home stored product entomology
- Invasive species
- List of common household pests
- Pest control
