= Parboiled rice =

Partially cooked rice

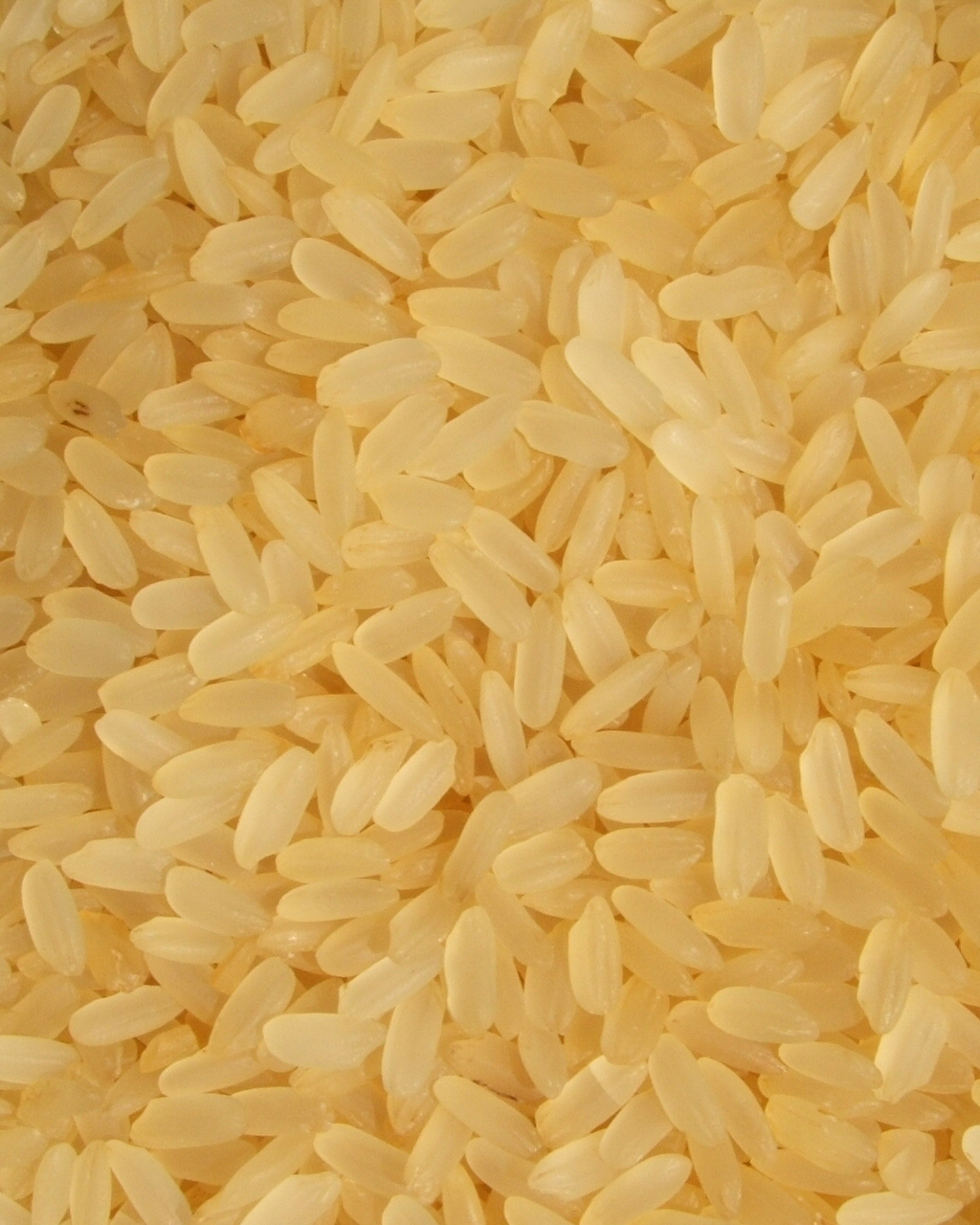
Parboiled rice

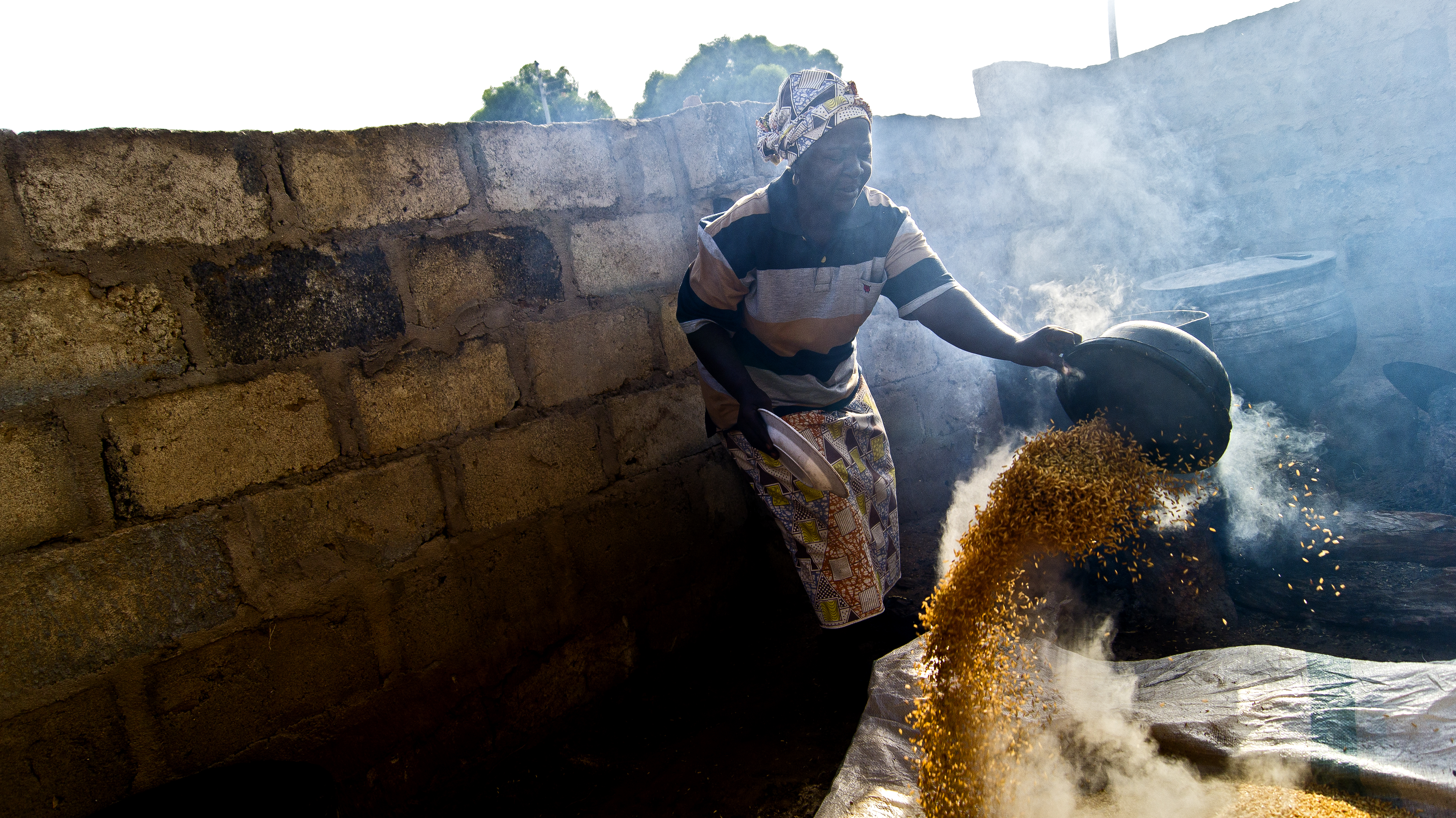
Woman preparing parboiled rice in Nigeria

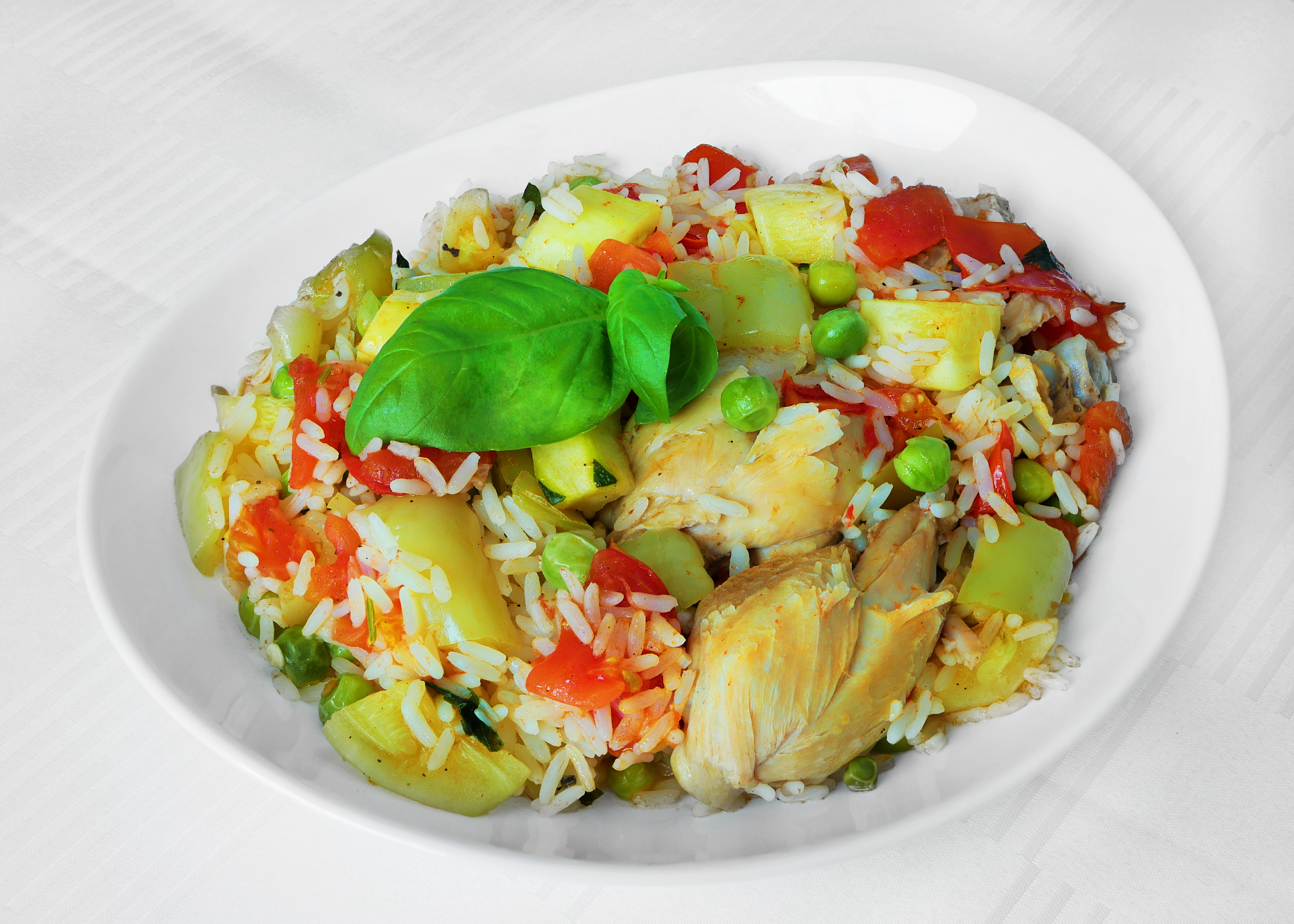
Prepared parboiled rice

Parboiled rice, also called converted rice, easy-cook rice, sella rice, and miniket (as predominantly called in West Bengal and Odisha in India, and in Bangladesh) is rice that has been partially boiled in the husk. The three basic steps of parboiling are soaking, steaming and drying. These steps make the rice easier to process by hand, while also boosting its nutritional profile, changing its texture, and making it more resistant to weevils. The treatment is practiced in many parts of the world.

Parboiling drives nutrients, especially thiamine, from the bran to the endosperm, hence parboiled white rice is mostly nutritionally similar to brown rice. Given the pale tan color that results from these bran components, parboiled rice is sometimes called saffron sella.

== Process and chemistry ==
The starches in parboiled rice become gelatinized, then retrograded after cooling. Through gelatinization, amylose molecules leach out of the starch granule network and diffuse into the surrounding aqueous medium outside the granules which, when fully hydrated are at maximum viscosity. The parboiled rice kernels should be translucent when wholly gelatinized. Cooling brings retrogradation whereby amylose molecules re-associate with each other and form a tightly packed structure. This increases the formation of type-3, resistant starch which can act as a prebiotic and benefit health in humans. However, this also makes the kernels harder and glassier. Parboiled rice takes less time to cook and is firmer and less sticky. In North America parboiled rice is often partially or fully precooked before sale. Minerals such as zinc or iron can be added, increasing their potential bio-availability in the diet.

=== Older methods ===
In older methods, clean paddy rice was soaked in cold water for 36–38 hours to give it a moisture content of 30–35%, after which the rice was put in parboiling equipment with fresh cold water and boiled until it began to split. The rice was then dried on woven mats, cooled and milled.

=== Huzenlaub Process ===
In the 1910s, German-British scientist Erich Gustav Huzenlaub (1888–1964) and the British scientist and chemist Francis Heron Rogers invented a form of parboiling which held more of the nutrients in rice, now known as the Huzenlaub Process. The whole grain is vacuum-dried, then steamed, followed by another vacuum drying and husking. This also makes the rice more resistant to weevils and lessens cooking time.

=== Modern methods ===
In even later methods the rice is soaked in hot water, then steamed for a few minutes. This only takes three hours rather than the twenty hours of traditional methods. These methods also yield a yellowish color in the rice, which undergoes less breakage when milled.

Other variations on parboiling include high-pressure steaming and various ways of drying (dry-heat, vacuum, etc.)

== Nutrition ==
Rice, brown, parboiled, dry, UNCLE BEN'S (#20042)
Nutritional value per 100 g (3.5 oz)
- Energy: 370 kcal (1,500 kJ)
- Carbohydrates: 78.68 g
- Sugars: 0.5 g
- Dietary fiber: 3.5 g
- Fat: 2.75 g
- Protein: 7.60 g
Vitamins and minerals
Vitamins	Quantity %DV^{†}
Thiamine (B1)	23% 0.277 mg
Riboflavin (B2)	7% 0.092 mg
Niacin (B3)	31% 4.973 mg
Vitamin B6	24% 0.407 mg
Folate (B9)	4% 14 μg
Vitamin K	1% 0.9 μg
Minerals	Quantity %DV^{†}
Calcium	1% 8 mg
Iron	6% 1.16 mg
Magnesium	23% 98 mg
Phosphorus	22% 275 mg
Potassium	7% 219 mg
Sodium	0% 6 mg
Zinc	18% 1.96 mg
- Other constituents: Quantity
- Water: 9.82 g
- ^{†}Percentages estimated using US recommendations for adults, except for potassium, which is estimated based on expert recommendation from the National Academies.

Compared to brown rice, parboiling of rice incurs losses of thiamin, niacin, biotin, and pantothenic acid by approximately 70%, 28%, 49% and 25%, respectively. Compared to normal milling, which causes a near 65% loss of all these micronutrients, parboiling preserves more of them. The specific loss depends on the process used by individual manufacturers: for the USDA #20042 sample, much less loss in these nutrients is observed. Fortification is common for parboiled rice in the United States. Depending upon the method used, levels of arsenic can increase or decrease significantly.

Raw paddy rice.

Vitamins and minerals in the bran.

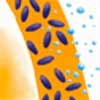
Put in a vacuum, rice loses all the air it carries within. In a following warm water bath the nutrients become more soluble and move out of the bran.

To move these nutrients into the kernel, hot steam and air pressure are used, otherwise they would rinse out into the water.

Parboiled rice carries most of the nutrients of brown rice. (This graphic does not depict the fraction lost.)

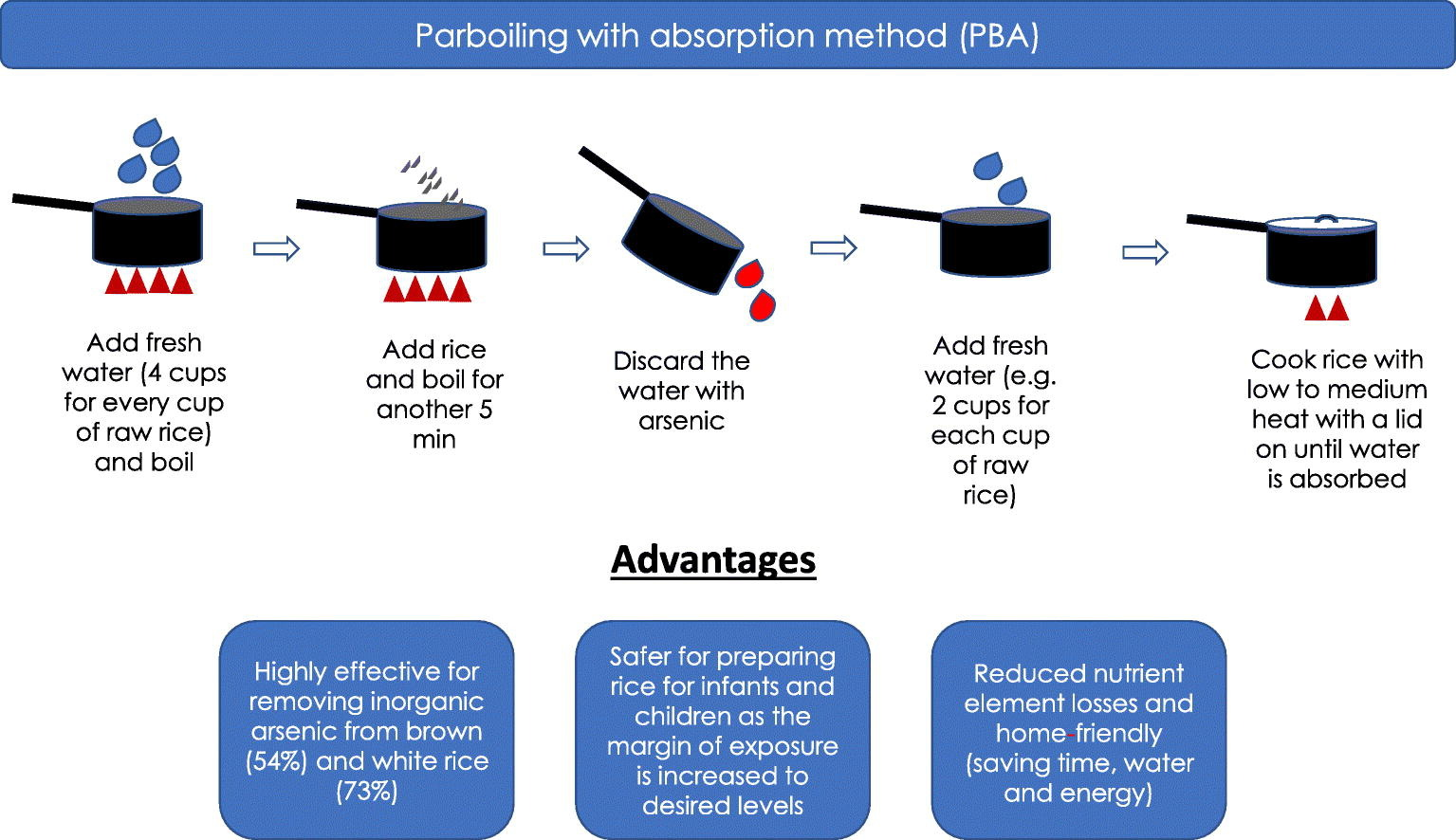
An improved rice cooking approach to maximise arsenic removal while preserving nutrient elements

A 2020 scientific study assessed multiple preparation procedures of rice for their capacity to reduce arsenic content and preserve nutrients, recommending a procedure involving parboiling and water absorption.

== See also ==
- Matta rice
- Rice congee
- Ben's Original (formerly known as Uncle Ben's) Converted Rice
