= List of common household pests =

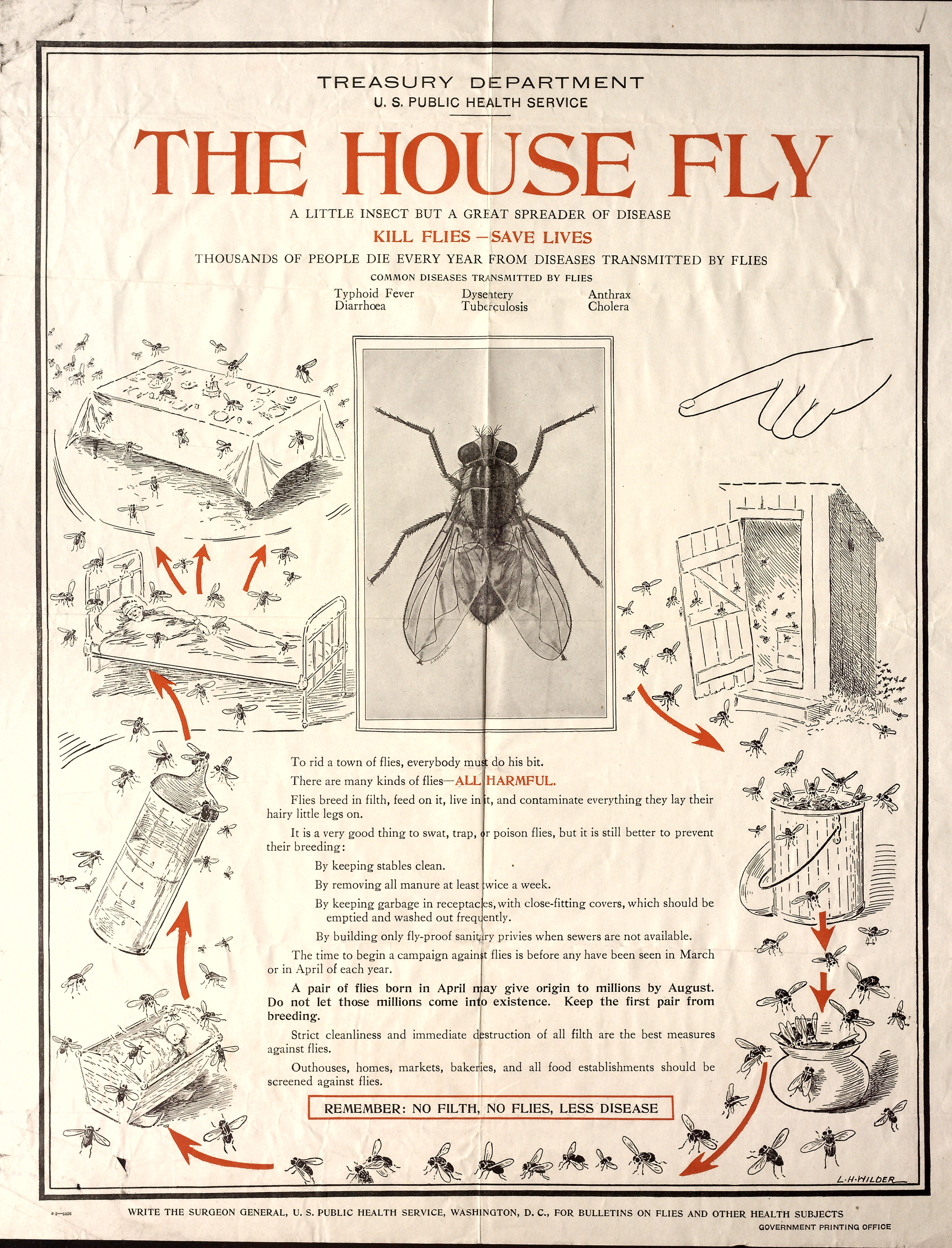
The house fly is found all over the world where humans live and so is the most widely distributed insect.

This is a list of common household pests – undesired animals that have a history of living, invading, causing damage, eating human foods, acting as disease vectors or causing other harms in human habitation.

== Mammals ==
- Mice
  - Field mice
  - House mice
- Possums
  - Brushtail possum
  - Ringtail possum
- Rats
  - Black rats
  - Brown rats
  - Wood rats
  - Cotton rats

== Invertebrates ==
- Ants
  - Argentine ants
  - Carpenter ants
  - Fire ants
  - Odorous house ants
  - Pharaoh ants
  - Thief ants
- Bed bugs
- Beetles
  - Woodworms
    - Death watch beetles
    - Furniture beetles
  - Weevils
    - Maize weevil
    - Rice weevil
  - Carpet beetles
    - Fur beetles
    - Varied carpet beetles
  - Spider beetles
  - Mealworm beetles
- Centipedes
  - House centipedes
- Cockroaches
  - Brown-banded cockroaches
  - German cockroaches
  - American cockroaches
  - Oriental cockroaches
- Dust mites
- Earwigs
- Crickets
  - House crickets
- Firebrats
- Flies
  - Bottle flies
    - Blue bottle flies
    - Green bottle flies
  - House flies
  - Fruit flies
  - Drain flies
  - Phorid flies
- Gnats (Fungus gnats)
- Mosquitoes
- Moths
  - Almond moths
  - Indianmeal moths
  - Clothes moths
    - Common clothes moths
    - Brown house moths
- Paper Lice
- Red spiders
- Silverfish
- Spiders
- Termites
  - Dampwood termites
  - Subterranean termites
- Woodlouse

== See also ==
- Home-stored product entomology
- List of notifiable diseases
- Noxious weed
- Pest (organism)
