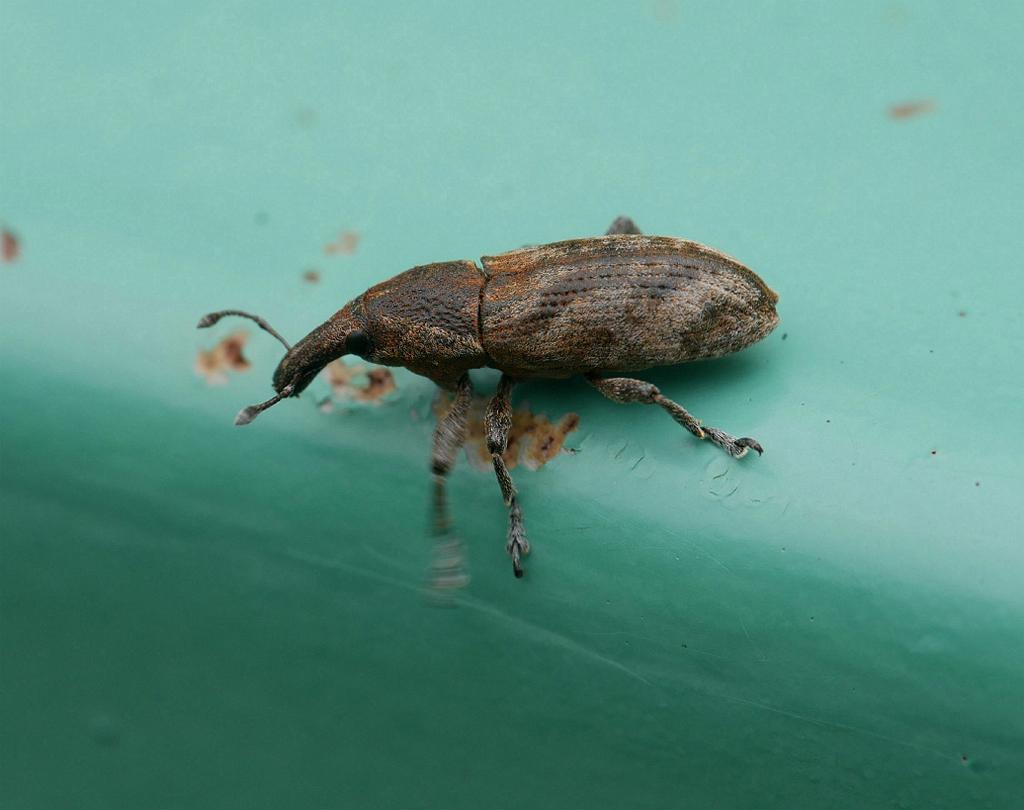

Scientific classification
- Kingdom: Animalia
- Phylum: Arthropoda
- Clade: Pancrustacea
- Class: Insecta
- Order: Coleoptera
- Suborder: Polyphaga
- Infraorder: Cucujiformia
- Superfamily: Curculionoidea
- Family: Curculionidae
- Genus: Lixus
- Species: L. acutipennis

Binomial name
- Lixus acutipennis (Roelofs, 1873)

Synonyms
- Cleonus acutipennis Roelofs, 1873

= Lixus acutipennis =

Species of beetle

Lixus acutipennis is a species of true weevil in the beetle family Curculionidae, and was first described in 1873 as Cleonus acutipennis by Willem Roelofs. It is found on the Korean Peninsula (including on Jeju Island) and in Japan and China.

It is an agricultural pest in Japan, where it is known primarily as a pest of chrysanthemums. Adults feed on leaves, but this does not cause significant damage. However, the larvae feed on the pith below the stem base, causing affected plants to become stunted or to die, and to become susceptible to breaking in the wind.

== Ecology ==
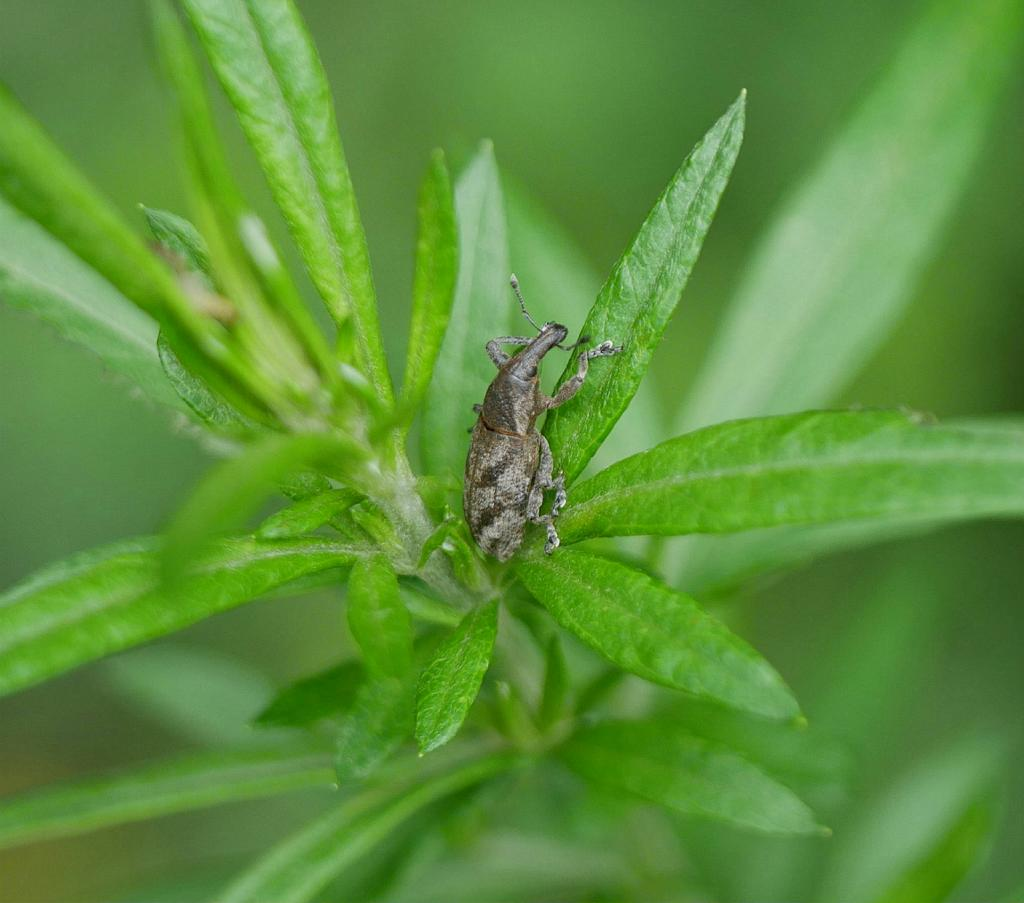
On host plant

In Japan, the adults begin appearing in April and reach peak numbers in May and June. The host plants are mainly members of the Asteraceae family.

Adults feed on the leaves of host plants. They lay eggs on the stems of those plants, particularly near the base, with females inserting their ovipositor into the stem. The hatched larvae feed from that position, eating the pith of the stem, and creating a tunnel out of the plant.
