= Lixus marginatus =

Scientific classification
- Kingdom: Animalia
- Phylum: Arthropoda
- Clade: Pancrustacea
- Class: Insecta
- Order: Coleoptera
- Suborder: Polyphaga
- Infraorder: Cucujiformia
- Superfamily: Curculionoidea
- Family: Curculionidae
- Genus: Lixus
- Species: L. marginatus

Binomial name
- Lixus marginatus Say, 1831

Species of beetle

Lixus marginatus is a species of true weevil in the beetle family Curculionidae.
