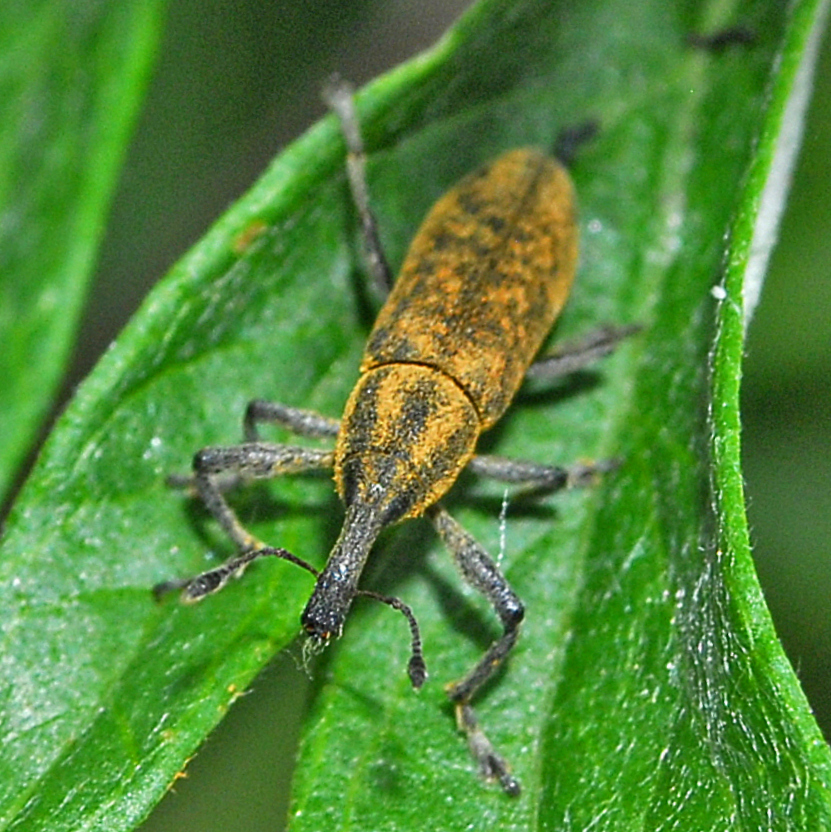
- Lixus fasciculatus. Front view

Scientific classification
- Kingdom: Animalia
- Phylum: Arthropoda
- Class: Insecta
- Order: Coleoptera
- Suborder: Polyphaga
- Infraorder: Cucujiformia
- Family: Curculionidae
- Genus: Lixus
- Species: L. fasciculatus

Binomial name
- Lixus fasciculatus Boheman, 1836

Synonyms
- List: Lixus (Dilixellus) elongatus Germar, 1824; Lixus (Dilixellus) globicollis Petri, 1905; Lixus (Dilixellus) oblongus Petri, 1905

= Lixus fasciculatus =

Species of beetle

Lixus fasciculatus is a species of weevils belonging to the family Curculionidae.

== Distribution ==
This species can be found France, Germany, Hungary, Italy, Moldova, Poland, Slovakia, South European Russia, and in the eastern Palearctic realm.

== Habitat ==
It prefers the regions with a mild winter. It inhabits sunlit forest edges, xerothermic grasslands, roadsides and clearings.

== Description ==
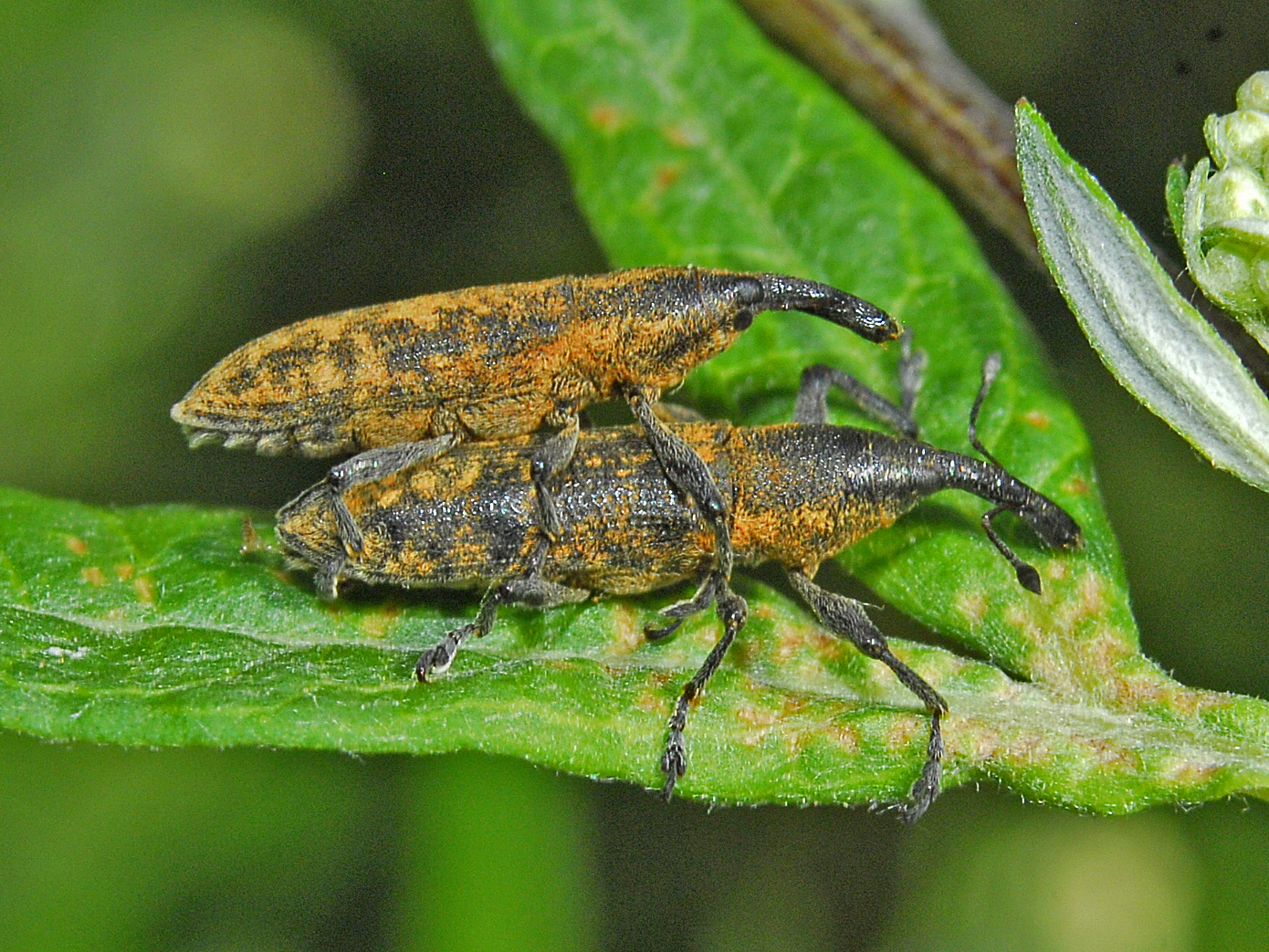
Lixus fasciculatus. Mating

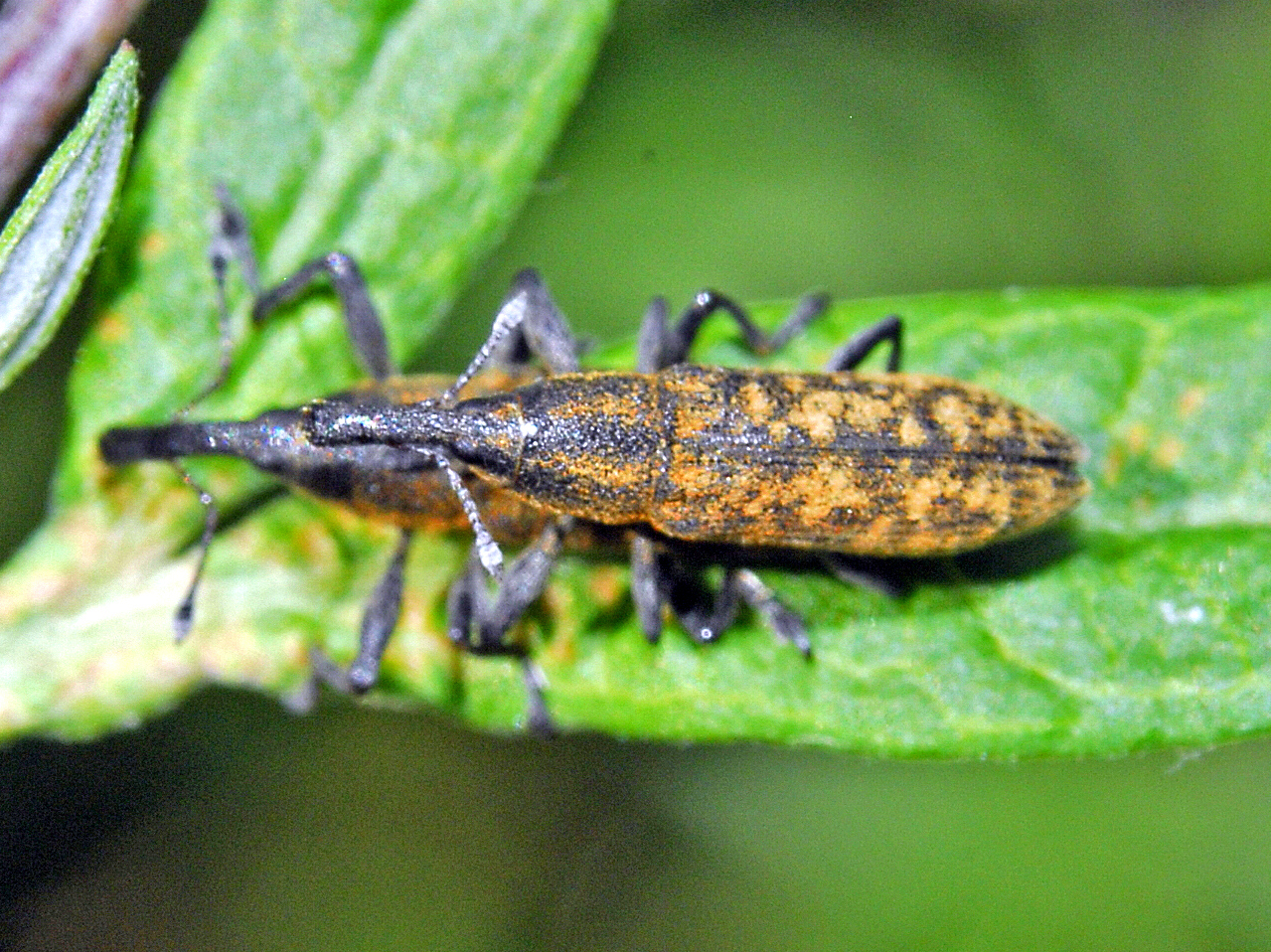
Mating, Dorsal view

Lixus fasciculatus can reach a length of 6.5–14 millimetres (0.26–0.55 in). These weevils are rather long with parallel sides and a distinctive long snout, longer in females than in males. The antennae are geniculate with small clubs. The integument is black to dark brown, shiny, slightly veiled by a pubescence formed of small pale ocher yellow to golden yellow hairs. They form irregular cloudy spots on the elytra, and four longitudinal stripes on the prothorax. The body is more densely hairy towards the sides. The head is conical, with a superficial punctuation. Legs are quite thin and long.

== Biology ==
Lixus fasciculatus is a univoltine species. Adults can be found from May to September. They feed on Artemisia vulgaris, Artemisia absinthium and Tanacetum vulgare. Mating occurs on the host plants. Egg are laid into stems of Artemisia vulgaris, where preimaginal development occurs.
