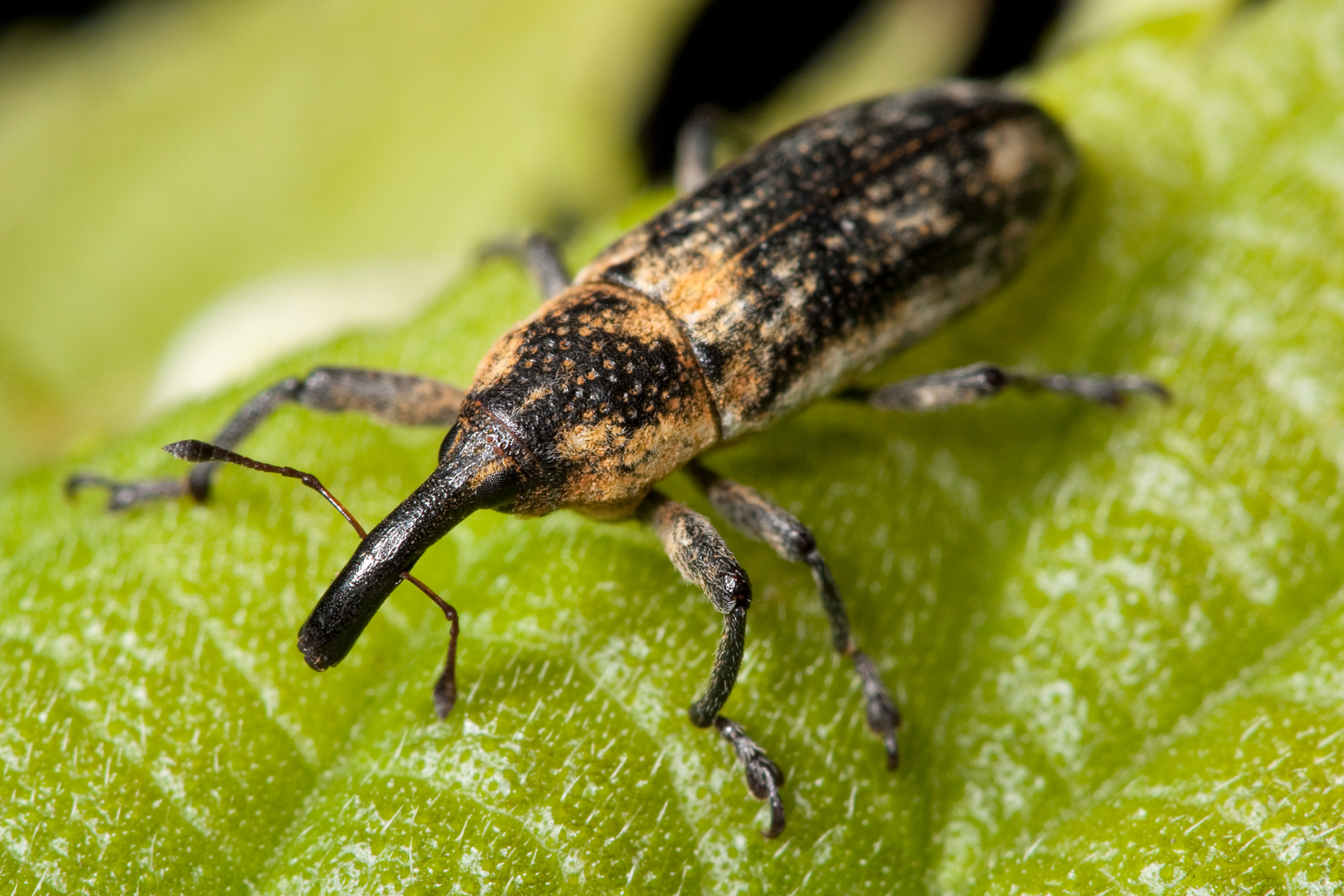

Scientific classification
- Kingdom: Animalia
- Phylum: Arthropoda
- Clade: Pancrustacea
- Class: Insecta
- Order: Coleoptera
- Suborder: Polyphaga
- Infraorder: Cucujiformia
- Superfamily: Curculionoidea
- Family: Curculionidae
- Genus: Lixus
- Species: L. scrobicollis

Binomial name
- Lixus scrobicollis Boheman, 1836

Synonyms
- Lixus acirostris Chittenden, 1930; Lixus dissimilis Chittenden, 1930; Lixus ivae Chittenden, 1930; Lixus laesicollis LeConte, 1858; Lixus ordinatipennis Chittenden, 1930; Lixus profundus Chittenden, 1930; Lixus quadratipunctatus Chittenden, 1930; Lixus sylvius Boheman, 1843

= Lixus scrobicollis =

Species of beetle

Lixus scrobicollis, the ragweed weevil, is a species of true weevil in the beetle family Curculionidae.
