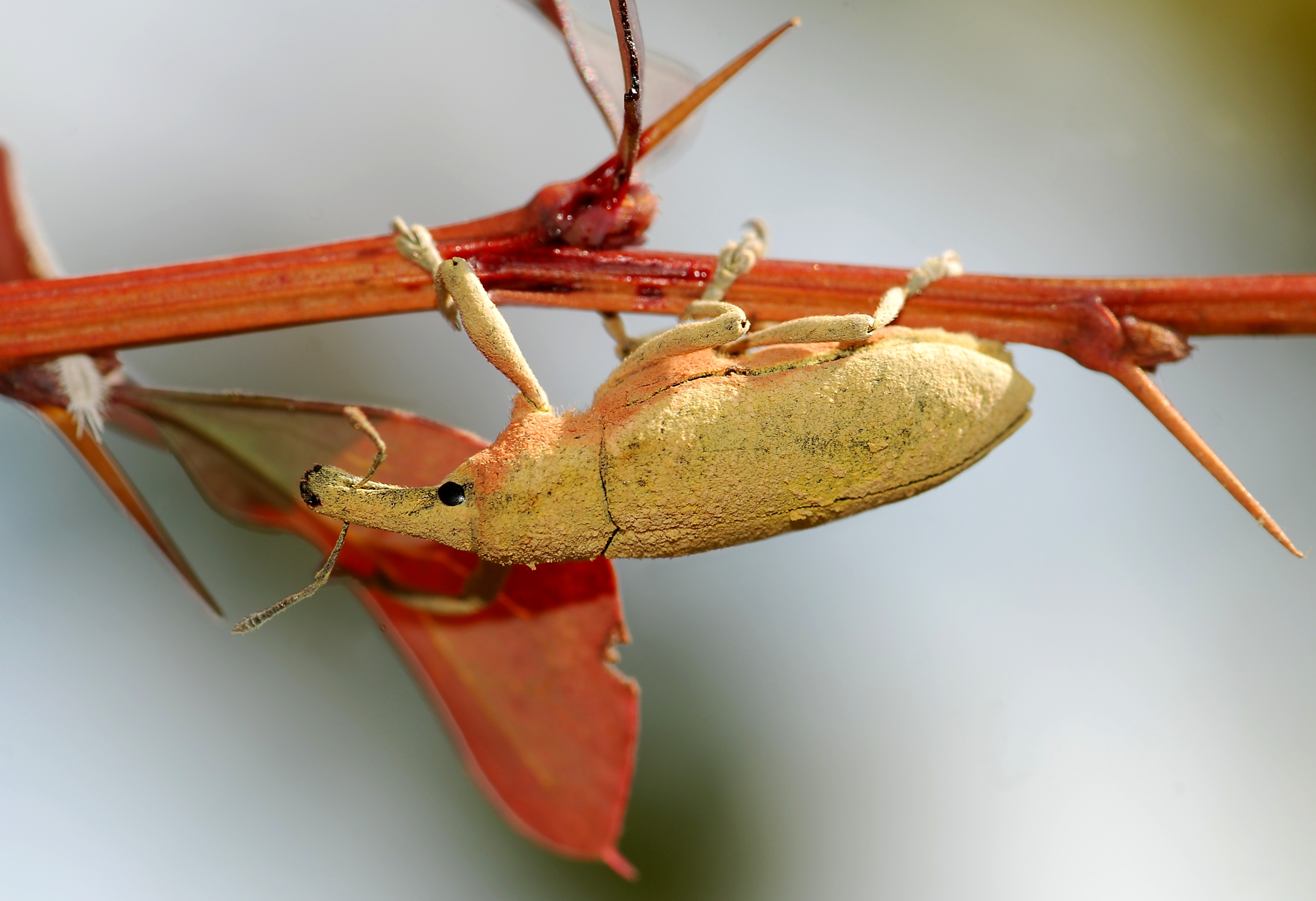
- Lixus angustatus

Scientific classification
- Kingdom: Animalia
- Phylum: Arthropoda
- Clade: Pancrustacea
- Class: Insecta
- Order: Coleoptera
- Suborder: Polyphaga
- Infraorder: Cucujiformia
- Superfamily: Curculionoidea
- Family: Curculionidae
- Subfamily: Lixinae
- Tribe: Lixini
- Genus: Lixus; Fabricius, 1801

Diversity
- At least 950 species

= Lixus (beetle) =

Genus of beetles

Lixus is a genus of true weevils in the beetle family Curculionidae, erected by the Danish entomologist, Johan Christian Fabricius in 1775. There are at least 950 described species in the genus Lixus.

== Selected species ==
- Lixus acutipennis (Roelofs, 1873)
- Lixus concavus Say, 1831 (rhubarb weevil)

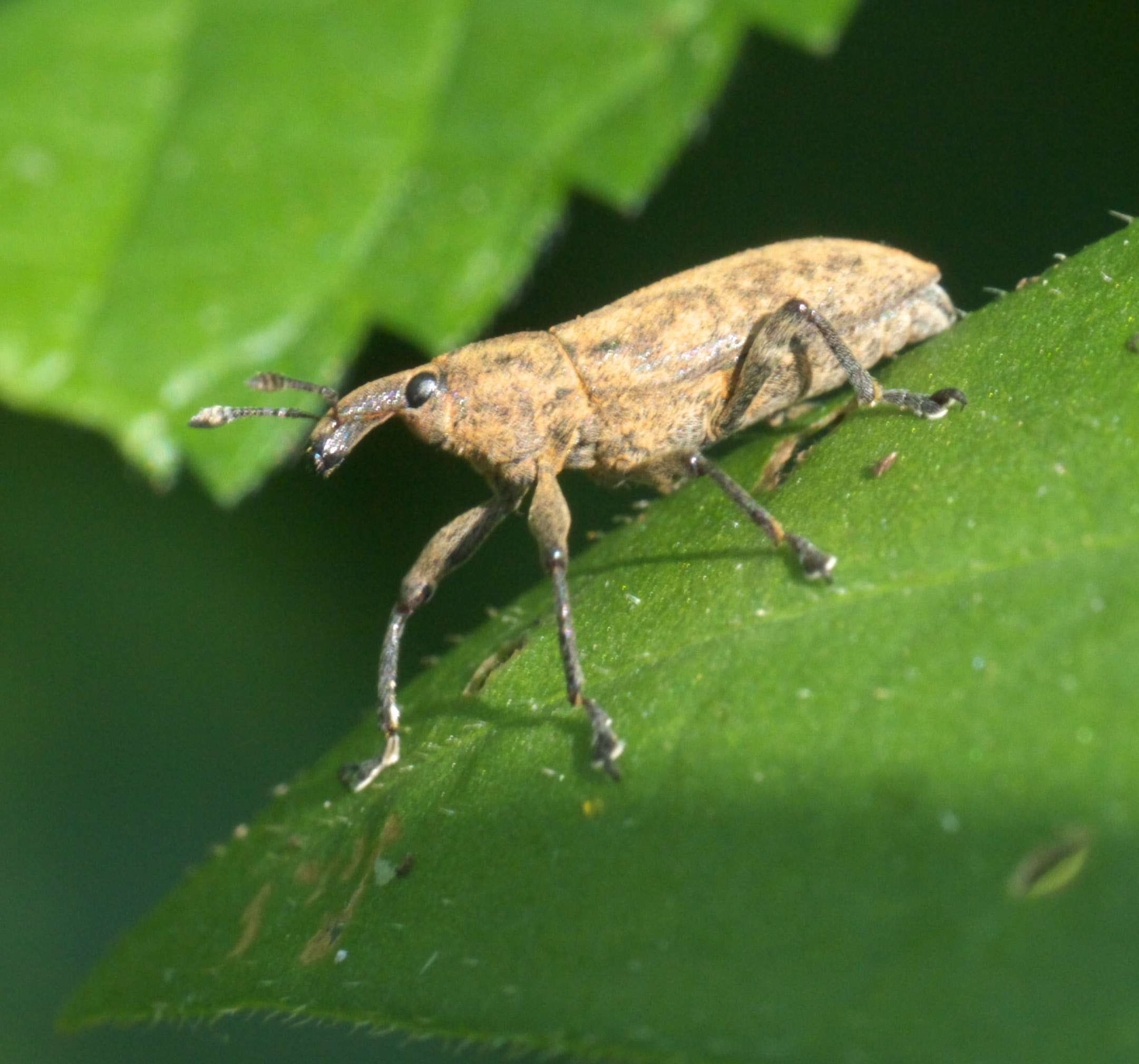
Lixus concavus

- Lixus fasciculatus Boheman, 1836
- Lixus juncii Boheman, 1835
- Lixus macer LeConte, 1876
- Lixus marginatus Say, 1831
- Lixus paraplecticus (Linnaeus, 1758) - type species (as Curculio paraplecticus Linnaeus, 1758)
- Lixus parcus LeConte, 1876 (knotweed weevil)
- Lixus scrobicollis Boheman, 1836 (ragweed weevil)

== See also ==
- List of Lixus species
