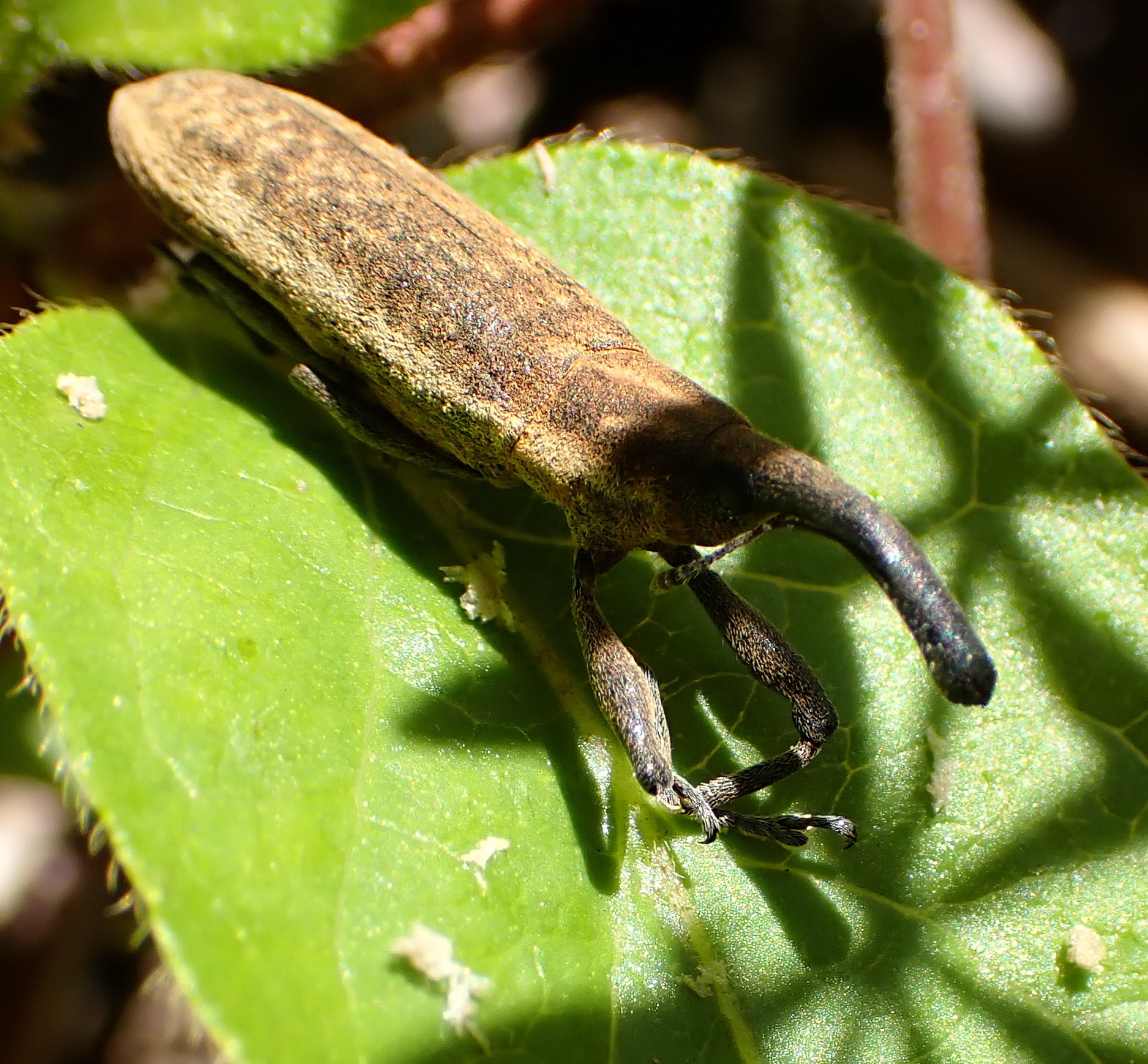
- Lixus macer, Virginia

Scientific classification
- Kingdom: Animalia
- Phylum: Arthropoda
- Clade: Pancrustacea
- Class: Insecta
- Order: Coleoptera
- Suborder: Polyphaga
- Infraorder: Cucujiformia
- Superfamily: Curculionoidea
- Family: Curculionidae
- Genus: Lixus
- Species: L. macer

Binomial name
- Lixus macer LeConte, 1876

Synonyms
- Lixus blatchleyi Csiki, 1934; Lixus capitatus Chittenden, 1930; Lixus novellus Blatchley, 1925

= Lixus macer =

Species of beetle

Lixus macer is a species of true weevil in the beetle family Curculionidae. It is found in the eastern United States.
