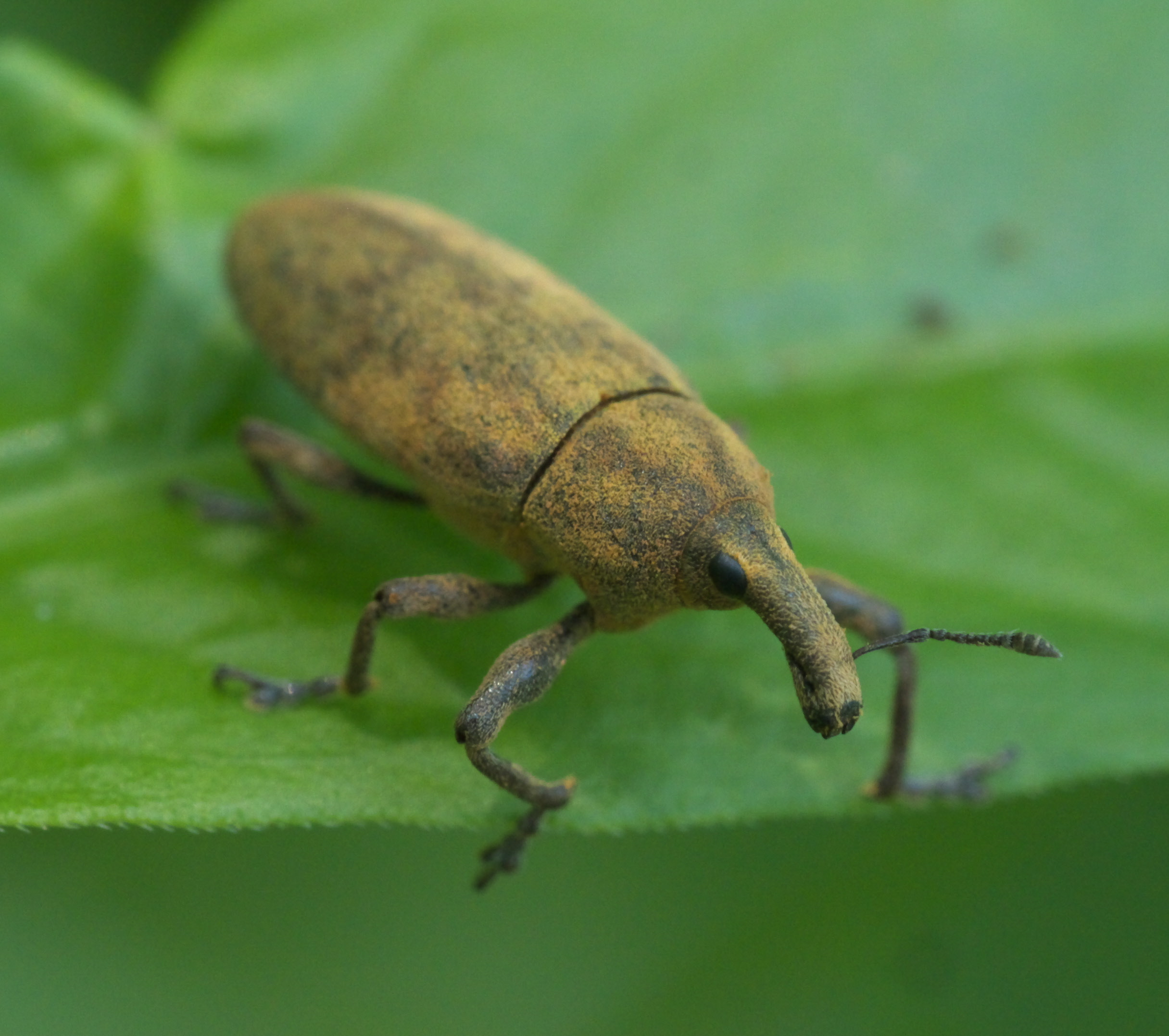

Scientific classification
- Kingdom: Animalia
- Phylum: Arthropoda
- Clade: Pancrustacea
- Class: Insecta
- Order: Coleoptera
- Suborder: Polyphaga
- Infraorder: Cucujiformia
- Superfamily: Curculionoidea
- Family: Curculionidae
- Genus: Lixus
- Species: L. concavus

Binomial name
- Lixus concavus Say, 1831

= Lixus concavus =

Rhubarb curculio

Species of beetle

Lixus concavus, commonly called the rhubarb curculio, is a species of weevil. Rhubarb (Rheum species) is a host, together with dock, sunflower, and various species of thistle.

== Characteristics ==
L. concavus has a distinctive long snout and geniculate antennae with small clubs. The beetle is about half an inch in length, black, covered with yellow dust, and hibernates as an adult. Eggs are a yellow-white colour and oblong in shape; the legless larva is a grub, about 3/4 inch in length, with a brown head that usually bears an inverted, Y-shaped mark.

== Life cycle ==
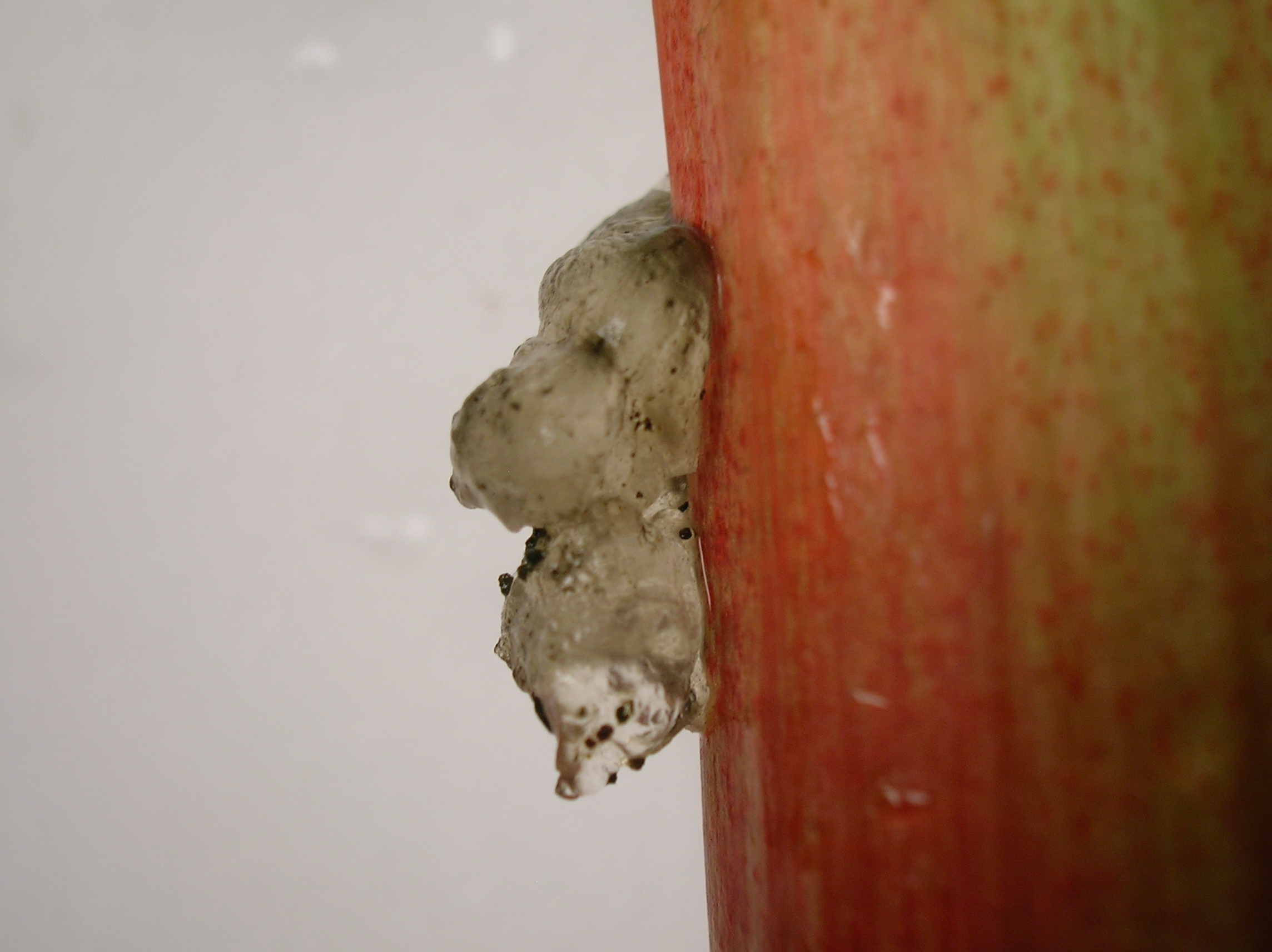
Injury on rhubarb stalk caused by L. concavus

The adult rhubarb curculio overwinters in leaf litter or other similar sites and appears in mid-May. The adult makes feeding and egg punctures in the crowns, roots, and stalks; a jelly-like sap exudes from the wounds as glistening drops of gum, often with extraneous material trapped within. The eggs laid in rhubarb do not hatch, but are killed by the sap or crushed by the developing tissues.

Lixus concavus is able to complete its lifecycle in the stalks of curly dock, sunflowers, and thistles; eggs are laid singly in 1/8-inch-deep (3.2 mm) cavities, created by feeding activity, and hatch within a week to 10 days. One grub usually develops per plant, the larva having burrowed through the stalk down to ground level, where pupation occurs after around nine weeks; the larva chews an exit hole for the adults before pupating. The pupa is whitish and measures 14–15 mm long. The head bears the long snout of the adult form. The abdominal segments are marked with short spines. The larva takes a few weeks to develop into an adult that feeds for a few weeks before seeking out a site to overwinter. The weevil has one generation per year. The adult weevil feeds upon the margins of the leaves besides puncturing the stalks; damage appears as distinct notches in the plant tissues.

== Control ==
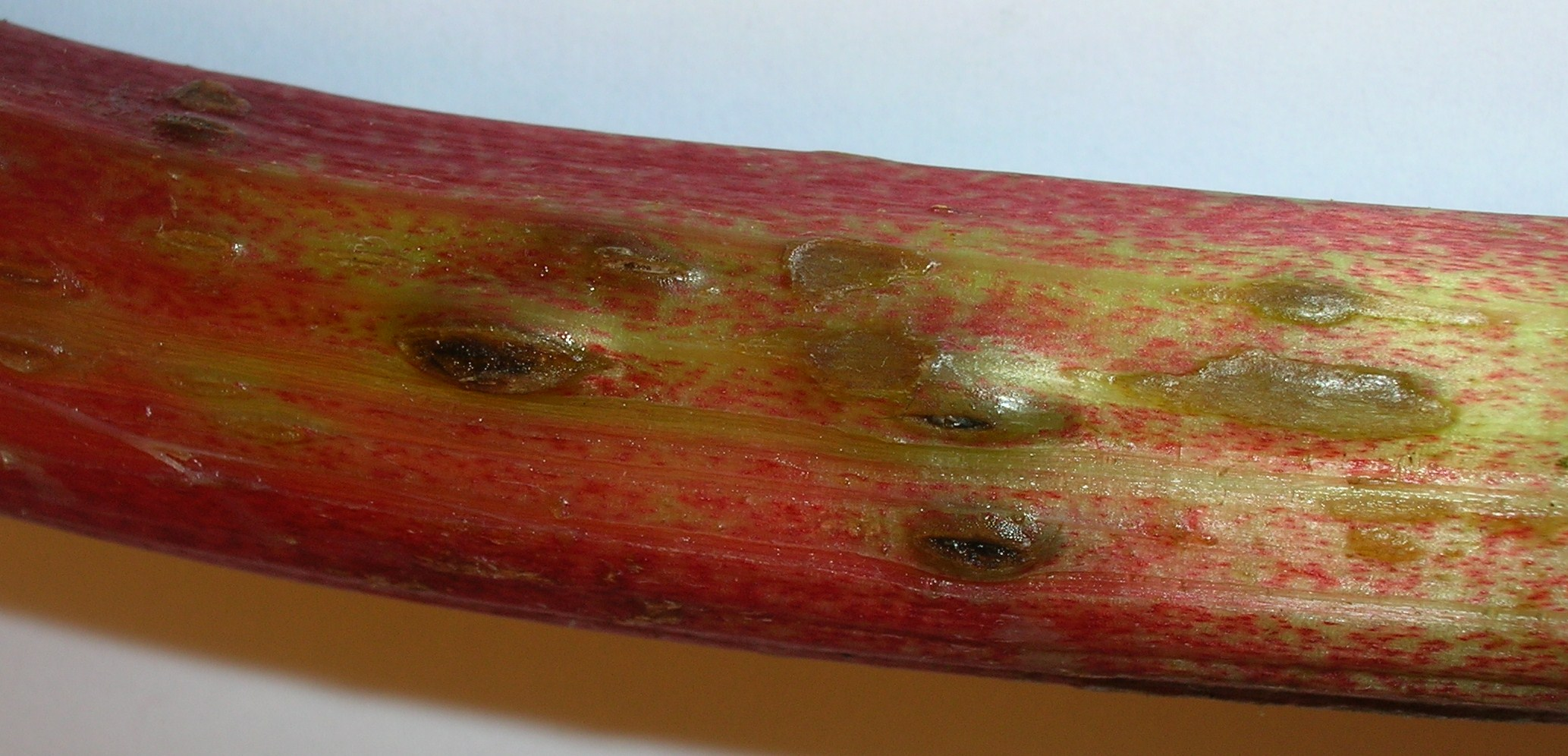
Injury on rhubarb stalk caused by L. concavus

L. concavus is usually present in fairly small numbers and can be handpicked and then destroyed. Removal of the other host plants, such as curly dock, wild dock, sunflower, and thistle, during midsummer, when the L. concavus larvae are still in them, may also help to reduce pest populations.

== Parasites and cannibalism ==
The braconid wasp Rhaconotus fasciatus is the only recorded parasitoid of the rhubarb curculio. As stated, only a single larva develops to maturity in hosts other than rhubarb; it is not uncommon, however, to find several young larvae in the stalk of a host plant, indicating that the larvae may be cannibalistic.

== Distribution ==
L. concavus is found throughout the eastern United States west to Idaho, Utah, and Texas. In Canada, it is known from Ontario.

== See also ==
- Black vine weevil
- Boll weevil
- Wheat weevil
