= Erich Huzenlaub =

German-British chemist (1888–1964)

- Born: Erich Gustav Huzenlaub; 27 October 1888; Stuttgart, Kingdom of Württemberg, German Empire
- Died: 12 September 1964 (aged 75); Houston, Texas, US
- Occupation: Chemist

Erich Gustav Huzenlaub (27 October 1888 – 12 September 1964) was a German-British chemist. He invented the Huzenlaub process for parboiling rice.

== Life ==
Huzenlaub studied chemistry in Germany, served in the German military, and emigrated to London where he became a British citizen. He traveled the world pursuing various enterprises, chief among these included the invention of numerous food improvement processes.

While in London, Huzenlaub founded the company Converted Rice, Ltd. where a form of parboiling rice designed to retain more of the nutrients in rice was invented, now known as the Huzenlaub Process. The process consisted first in vacuum drying the whole grain, then steaming, and finally vacuum drying and husking. In addition to increasing rice's nutritional value, the process also made it resistant to weevils and reduced cooking time.

Together with Forrest Mars, Sr. they began two companies, "Rice Converted, Inc." and "Mars and Huzenlaub" in the United States. Huzenlaub visited a number of rice millers in Louisiana, Arkansas, and Mississippi in the early to mid-1940s. They financed and built up a plant for parboiled rice in Houston, Texas. Rice Converted, Inc's sole client was the US military which needed Converted Rice, Inc's rice to airdrop to troops throughout World War II as it was resistant to infestation.

Once the war ended, Rice Converted, Inc. rebranded as "Uncle Ben's Converted Rice," the first branded rice of its time.

== See also ==
- Ben's Original
