= Ben's Original =

Brand of parboiled rice and related foods

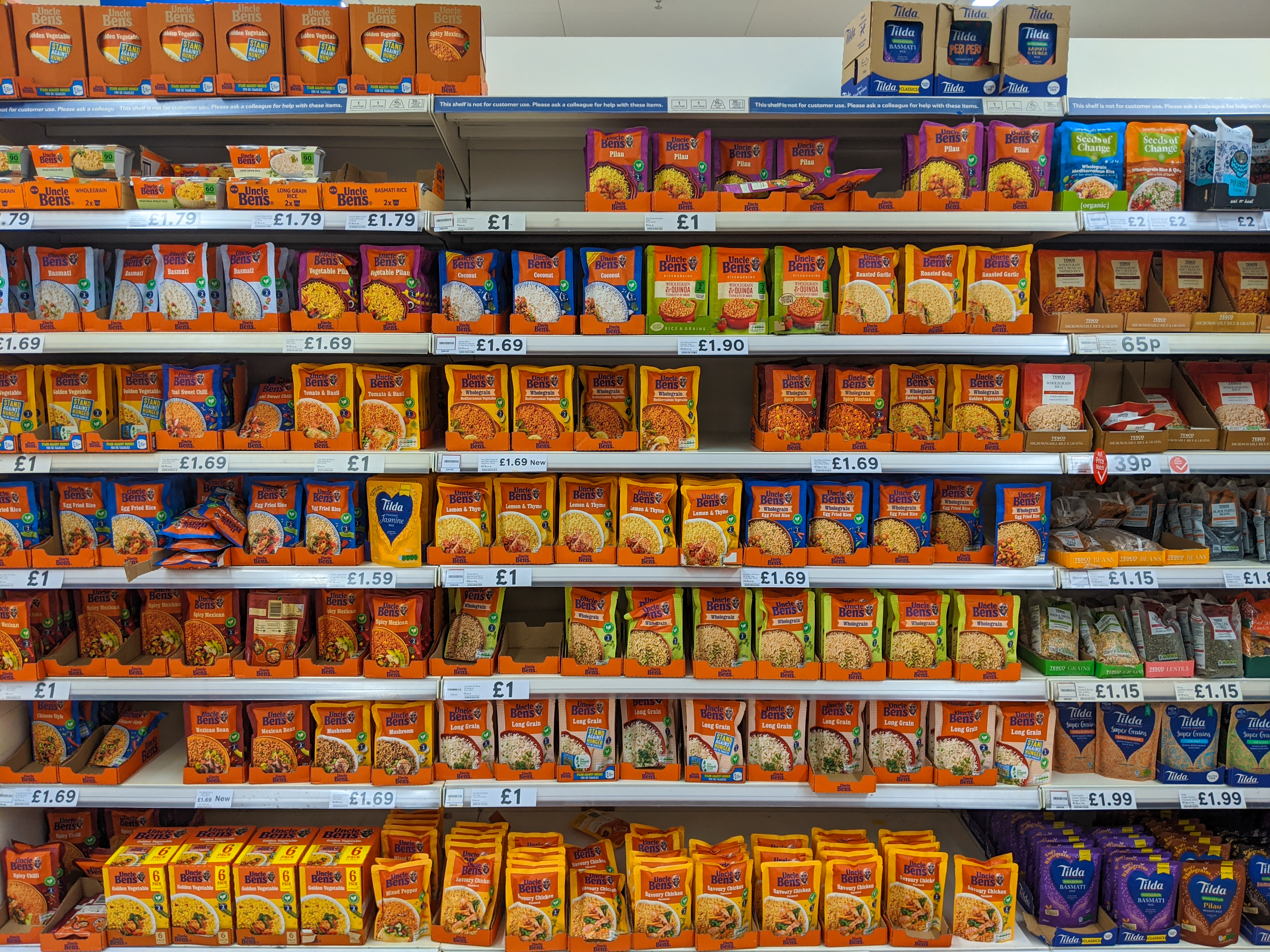
- Ben's Original packages in Tesco
- Product type: Rice
- Current owner: Mars, Inc.
- Produced by: Mars, Inc.
- Country: United States
- Introduced: 1943; 83 years ago
- Markets: Worldwide
- Website: bensoriginal.com

Ben's Original, formerly called Uncle Ben's, is an American brand of parboiled rice and other related food products that were introduced by Converted Rice Inc., which is now owned by Mars, Inc. Uncle Ben's rice was first marketed in 1943 and was the top-selling rice in the United States until the 1990s. In 2020, it was rebranded as "Ben's Original".

== History ==
In the 1910s, the German-British chemist Erich Huzenlaub (1888–1964) and the British chemist Francis Heron Rogers invented a form of parboiling designed to retain more of the nutrients in rice, now known as the Huzenlaub Process.

The process entailed vacuum drying the whole grain, then steaming, and finally, vacuum drying and removal of the husk. This increased the rice's nutritional value, reduced cooking time, and made it resistant to weevils.

In 1932, Forrest Mars Sr. moved to the United Kingdom with a remit to expand the Mars food company internationally. While in the United Kingdom, Mars learned of Erich Huzenlaub's work with rice. Huzenlaub's London-based company was Rice Conversion Ltd. The two eventually formed Mars and Huzenlaub in Houston, Texas, which gave Forrest Mars partial ownership of the Huzenlaub Process rice conversion patent.

In 1942, through Mars's guidance and sponsorship, Huzenlaub created, together with Houston food broker Gordon L. Harwell, the company Converted Rice, Inc., which sold its entire output to the U.S. and British armed forces. The advantage of this product was that it could be air-dropped to troops in the field without the risk of weevil infestation, and it could be cooked more quickly than other rice products. Additionally, the converted rice product would retain more nutritional value. In 1944, with additional financing from the Defense Plant Corporation and an investment by Forrest Mars, it built a second large plant. In 1959, Forrest Mars purchased Erich Huzenlaub's interest in the company and merged it into his Food Manufacturers, Inc.

Uncle Ben's milling plant was on the Houston Ship Channel until 1999 when it moved to Greenville, Mississippi.

== Marketing ==
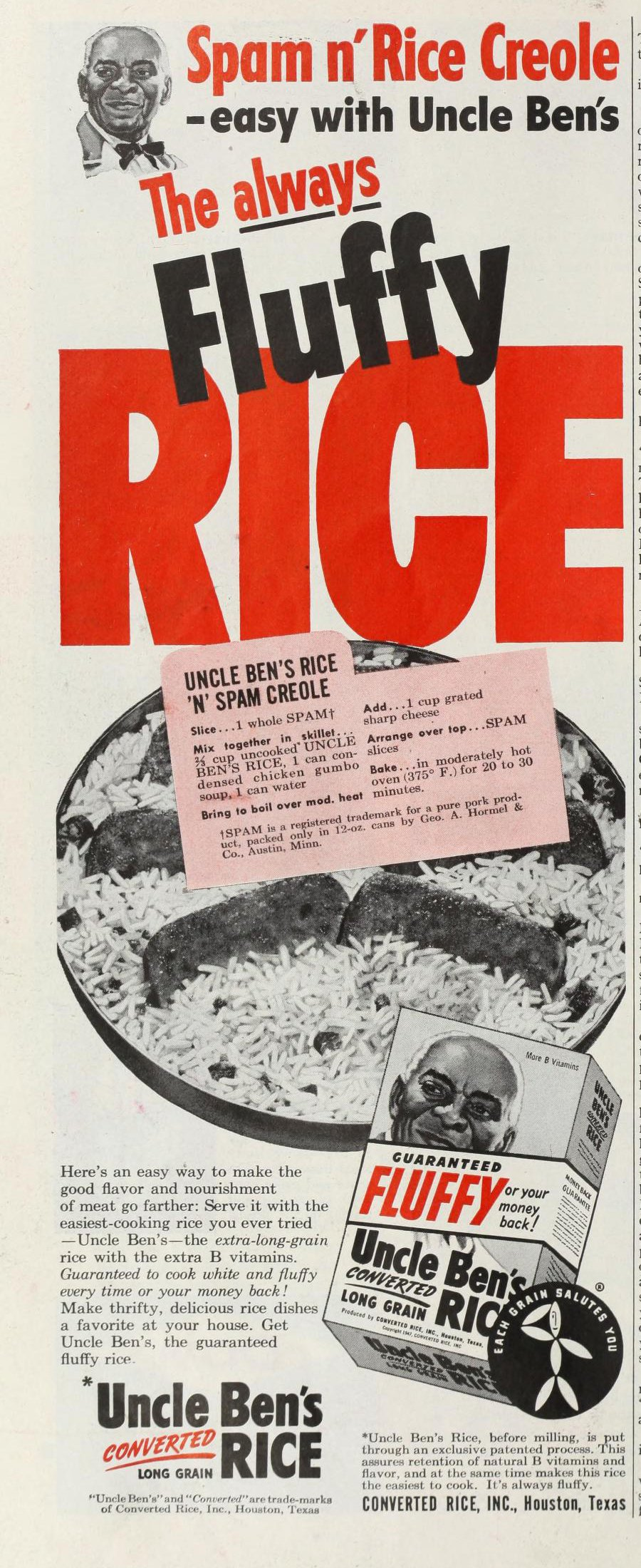
Ad for the product from 1951

From 1946 to 2020, Uncle Ben's products carried the image of an elderly African-American man dressed in a bow tie, which is said to have been based on a Chicago maître d'hôtel named Frank Brown with the name "Ben" being a possible reference to a shrewd rice farmer from Houston. In 2020, Mars told Ad Age, "We don't know if a real 'Ben' ever existed." Previously, Mars had described Uncle Ben as an African-American rice grower known for the quality of his rice, and claimed that Gordon L. Harwell, an entrepreneur who had supplied rice to the armed forces in World War II, chose the name "Uncle Ben's" as a means to expand his marketing efforts to the general public.

In March 2007, Uncle Ben's image was "promoted" to the "chairman of the board" by a new advertising campaign.

In September 2017, Mars, Inc. started to certify the sustainability of basmati rice sold under the Uncle Ben's brand to encourage local farmers to opt for the best agricultural methods.

In the aftermath of the murder of George Floyd, Mars, Inc. announced on June 17, 2020, that it would be "evolving" the brand's identity, including the logo. The move followed just hours after Quaker/PepsiCo changed the name and logo of its Aunt Jemima brand amid accusations of racism. As advertised on September 23, 2020, Mars Inc. replaced both the name "Uncle Ben's" along with the brand's historic logo depicting a well-dressed and bald black man in a bow tie, rebranding itself as simply "Ben's Original", with the new packaging becoming widely available in the United States and Canada from about June 2021.
