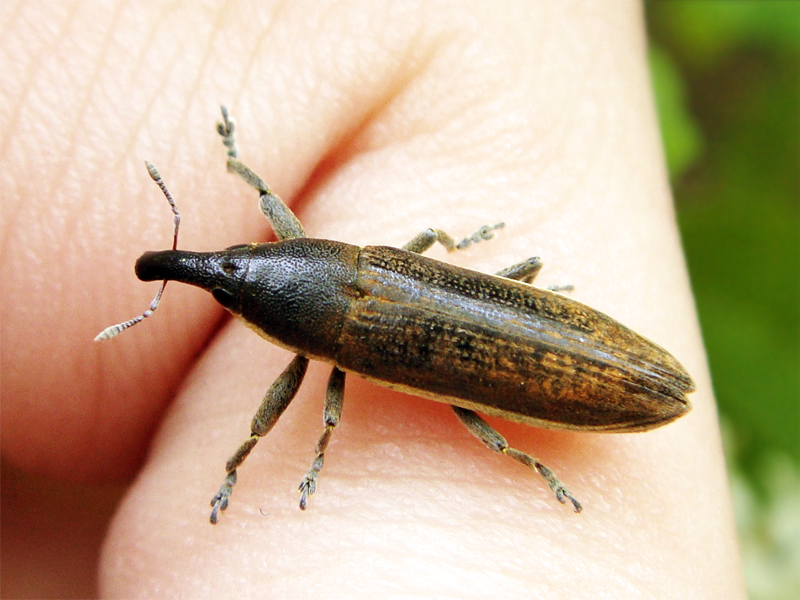

Scientific classification
- Kingdom: Animalia
- Phylum: Arthropoda
- Clade: Pancrustacea
- Class: Insecta
- Order: Coleoptera
- Suborder: Polyphaga
- Infraorder: Cucujiformia
- Superfamily: Curculionoidea
- Family: Curculionidae
- Genus: Lixus
- Species: L. juncii

Binomial name
- Lixus juncii Boheman, 1835

= Lixus juncii =

Species of weevil

Lixus juncii is a species of weevil in the genus Lixus of the family Curculionidae.

== Description ==
The adults grow up to 15mm long, the body is oblong and has a dark brown coloration. A white border observable below the elytra is a physical feature that distinguishes this species from the other weevils.

== Biology ==
This species lives in the soil during winter and goes out from February to June. Females lay their eggs (from 40 to 50) in holes dug thanks to their rostrum in beetroot or Chenopodium stems. The eclosion of these eggs from 4 to 15 days later gives birth to larvae which dig tunnels in petioles and stems. As a consequence, this species of weevil is considered as a harmful insect of beetroot cultivations.
