= Lixus parcus =

Scientific classification
- Kingdom: Animalia
- Phylum: Arthropoda
- Clade: Pancrustacea
- Class: Insecta
- Order: Coleoptera
- Suborder: Polyphaga
- Infraorder: Cucujiformia
- Superfamily: Curculionoidea
- Family: Curculionidae
- Genus: Lixus
- Species: L. parcus

Binomial name
- Lixus parcus LeConte, 1876

Synonyms
- Lixus pygmaeus Casey, 1891

Species of beetle

Lixus parcus, the knotweed weevil, is a species of snout or bark beetle in the family Curculionidae. It is found in North America.
