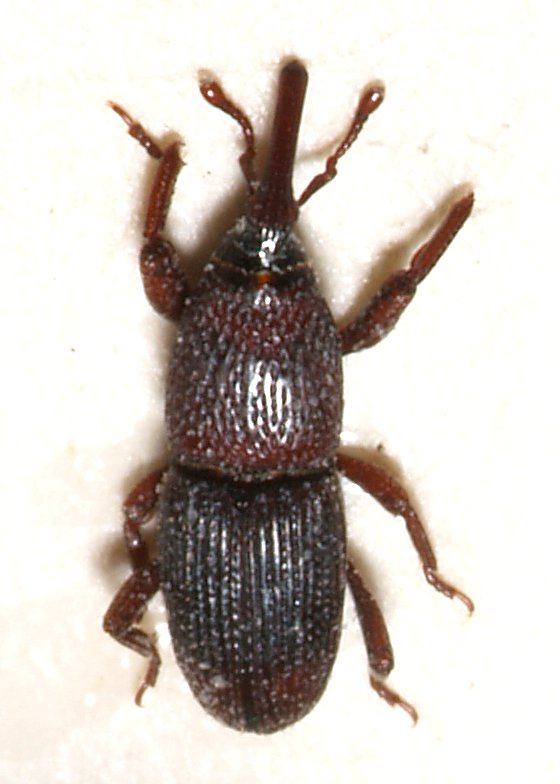
- Sitophilus granarius

Scientific classification
- Kingdom: Animalia
- Phylum: Arthropoda
- Class: Insecta
- Order: Coleoptera
- Suborder: Polyphaga
- Infraorder: Cucujiformia
- Family: Curculionidae
- Subfamily: Dryophthorinae
- Tribe: Litosomini
- Genus: Sitophilus; Schoenherr, 1838

Species
- 14, see text

= Sitophilus =

Genus of beetles

Sitophilus is a genus of weevils in the tribe Litosomini. Some species are familiar as pests of stored grain, nut, or seed. Notable pest species include the rice weevil (S. oryzae), wheat weevil (S. granarius), and maize weevil (S. zeamais).

Among the Stiophilus are species which destroy stored wheat, rice, sorghum, oats, barley, rye, buckwheat, peas, cottonseed, processed cereal products such as pasta, cassava, and fruits such as apples.

== Distribution ==
The rice and maize weevils have a nearly cosmopolitan distribution, occurring throughout the warmer parts of the world. In Europe they are replaced by the temperate Palearctic wheat weevil.

== Biology ==
The adult female weevil bores a hole in a grain, nut, or seed, and deposits an egg, usually one egg per individual grain. She seals the hole with a secretion. The larva develops while feeding on the interior of the grain, and then pupates. It usually leaves the grain completely hollow when it exits as an adult. The wheat weevil can live on acorns, and may have used them as a host before agriculture made grain plentiful. The rice weevil can live on beans, nuts, grains, and some types of fruit, such as grapes. Several other Sitophilus use the acorns of oaks such as bluejack oak (Quercus incana) and moru oak (Q. floribunda). Some use the seeds of trees in the Dipterocarpaceae and the legume family, Fabaceae. The tamarind weevil (S. linearis) is only known from the seeds of tamarind.

Several Sitophilus species are hosts to an intracellular γ-Proteobacterium. Weevil and bacterium have a symbiotic relationship in which the bacterium produces nutrients such as amino acids and vitamins for the host, supplementing its cereal diet.

== Diversity ==
As of 1993, there are about 14 species of Sitophilus.

Species include:

- Sitophilus conicollis
- Sitophilus cribrosus
- Sitophilus erosa
- Sitophilus glandium
- Sitophilus granarius – wheat weevil, granary weevil
- Sitophilus linearis – tamarind weevil
- Sitophilus oryzae – rice weevil
- Sitophilus quadrinotatus
- Sitophilus rugicollis
- Sitophilus rugosus
- Sitophilus sculpturatus
- Sitophilus vateriae
- Sitophilus zeamais – maize weevil

Fossil taxa include:

- †Sitophilus punctatissimus
