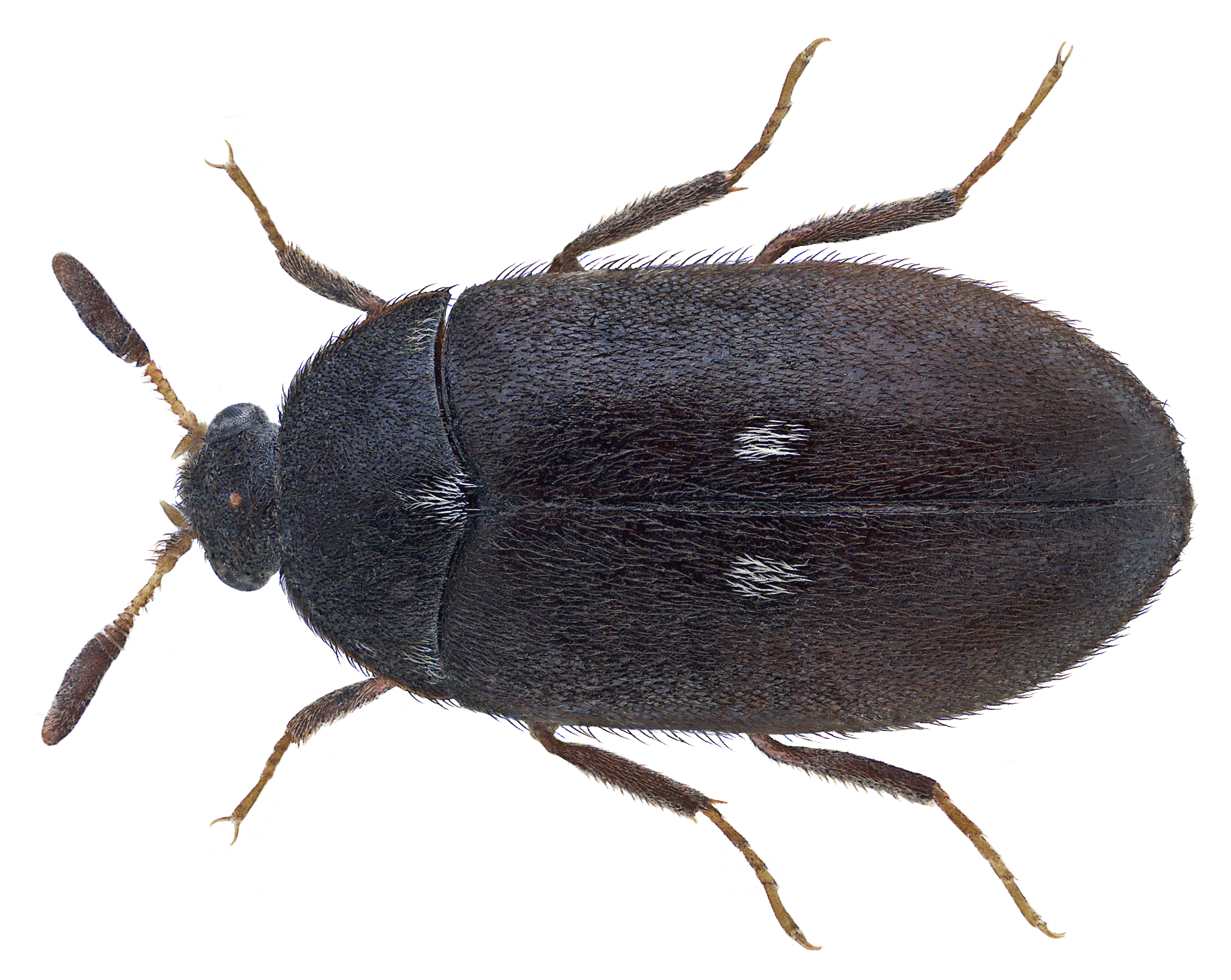

Scientific classification
- Kingdom: Animalia
- Phylum: Arthropoda
- Clade: Pancrustacea
- Class: Insecta
- Order: Coleoptera
- Suborder: Polyphaga
- Family: Dermestidae
- Genus: Attagenus
- Species: A. pellio

Binomial name
- Attagenus pellio (Linnaeus, 1758)

= Attagenus pellio =

Carpet beetle

Species of beetle

Attagenus pellio, the fur beetle or carpet beetle, is a pest which damages stored products such as furs, skins, textiles and grain.

It is a 4–6 mm-long oval shaped insect with two patches of white hair on the elytra. Their larvae, sometimes known as 'woolly bears' are honey-coloured and around ¼ inch long. The eggs are often laid in birds' nests, especially those of sparrows under the eaves. Thus they can invade homes where they live in floorboard cracks where wool or organic matter gathers. Nests of mice can also act as homes and food for the beetles.

== See also ==
- Home stored product entomology
