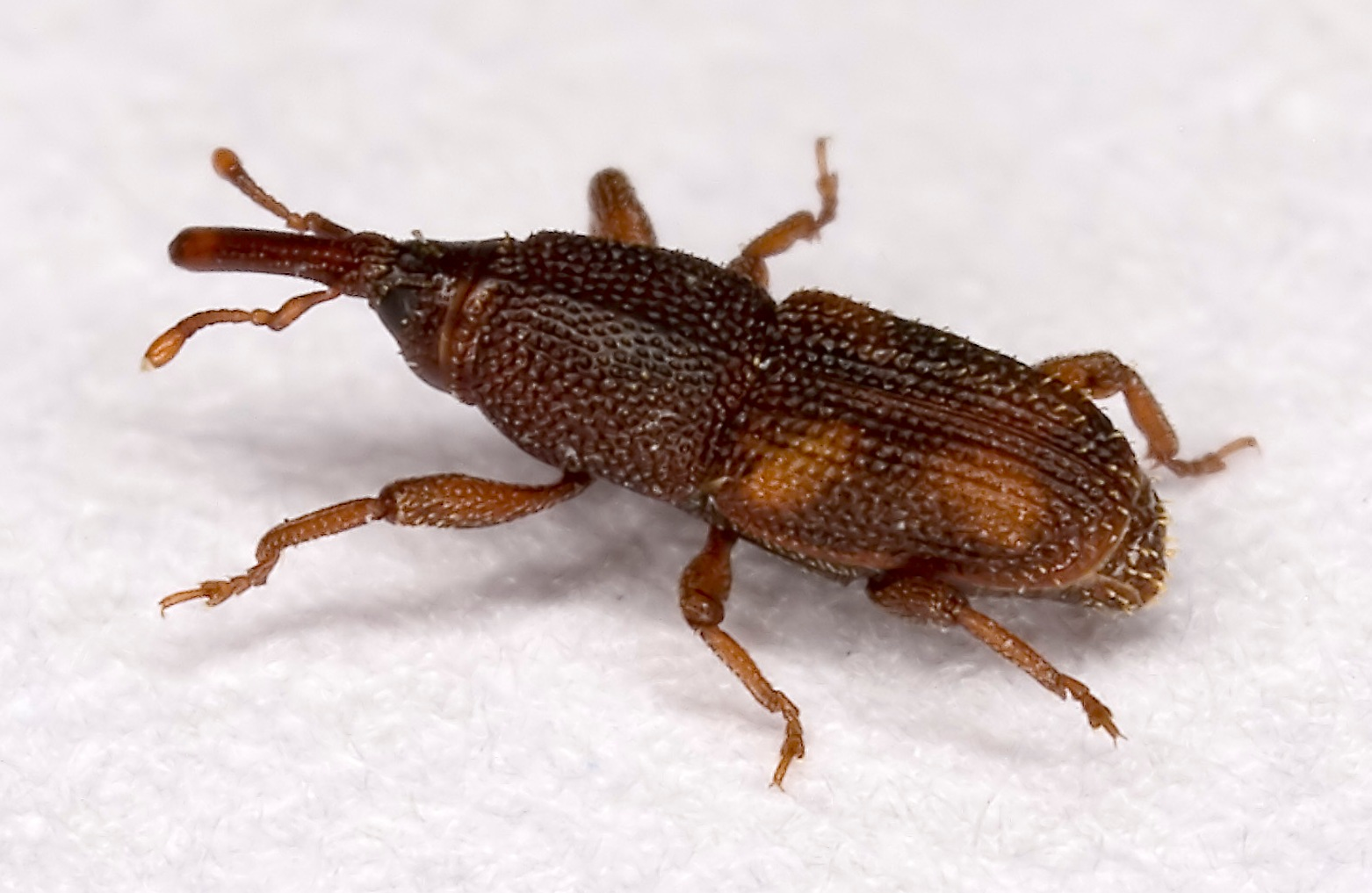
- Sitophilus oryzae

Scientific classification
- Domain: Eukaryota
- Kingdom: Animalia
- Phylum: Arthropoda
- Class: Insecta
- Order: Coleoptera
- Suborder: Polyphaga
- Infraorder: Cucujiformia
- Family: Curculionidae
- Subfamily: Dryophthorinae
- Tribe: Litosomini; Lacordaire, 1866

= Litosomini =

Tribe of beetles

The Litosomini are a tribe of weevils in the subfamily Dryophthorinae. Species of Sitophilus, which include the grain weevils, are important cosmopolitan, stored products pests.

== Genera ==
Wikispecies includes the following genera:

- Anogelia
- Autonopis
- Brenthidogenia
- Calandrites
- Calandrotopus
- Catapyges
- Crepidotus
- Daisya Anderson, 2003
- Dichthorrhinus
- Dyspnoetus
- Eucalandra Faust, 1899
- Ganae Pascoe, 1885
- Gypsophorus
- Laocalandra
- Laodaria
- Laogenia
- Laostates
- Melchus Lacordaire, 1866
- Microspathe Faust, 1899
- Myocalandra
- Neocalandra
- Neophrynoides O'Brien & Wibmer, 1982
- Oliabus
- Paramorphorrhinus
- Periphemus
- Sitophilus Schönherr, 1838
- Symmorphorhinus
- Tatiotimus
- Toxorhinus Lacordaire, 1866
- Tryphetus
