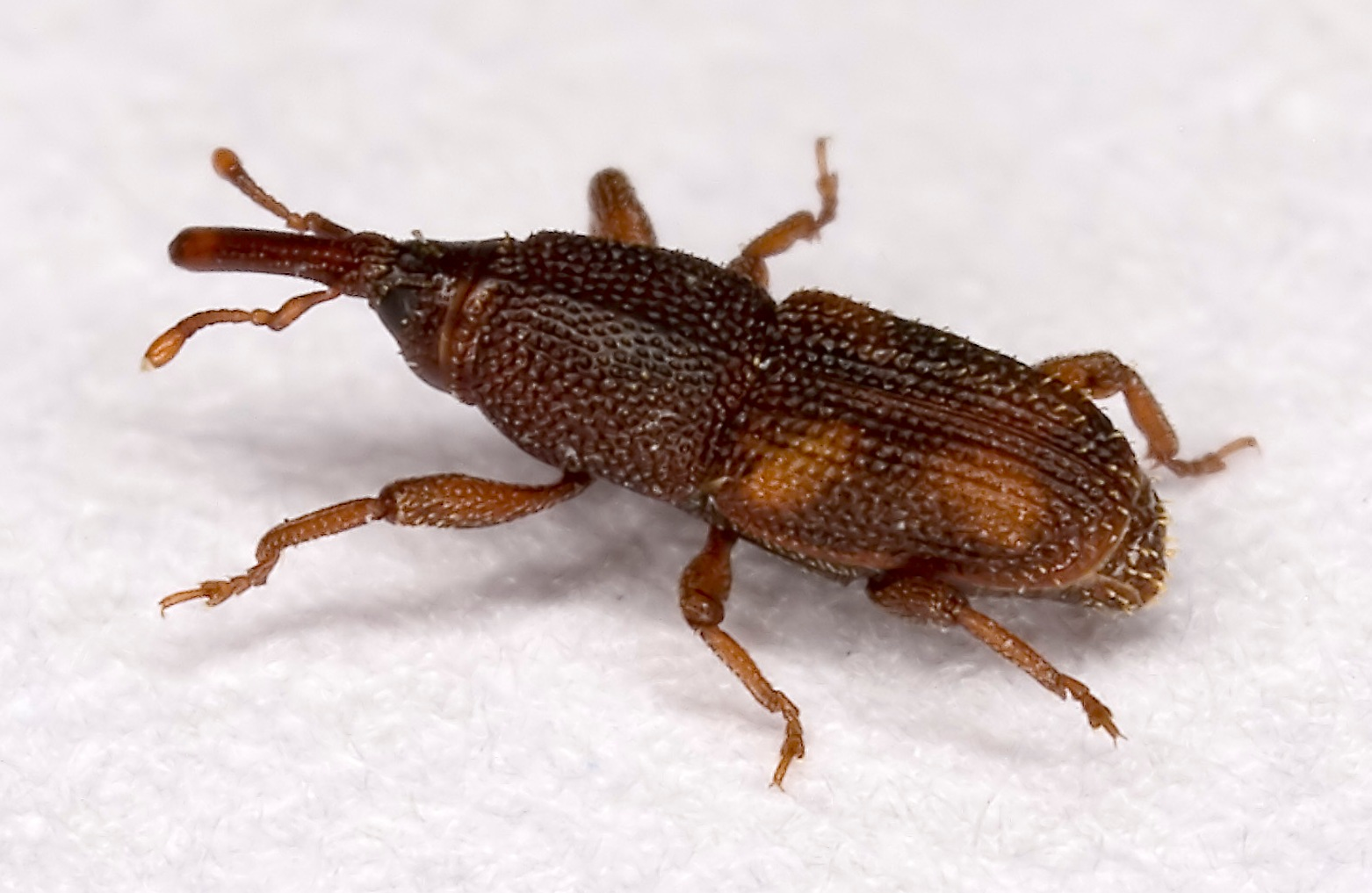

Scientific classification
- Kingdom: Animalia
- Phylum: Arthropoda
- Clade: Pancrustacea
- Class: Insecta
- Order: Coleoptera
- Suborder: Polyphaga
- Infraorder: Cucujiformia
- Superfamily: Curculionoidea
- Family: Curculionidae
- Genus: Sitophilus
- Species: S. oryzae

Binomial name
- Sitophilus oryzae (Linnaeus, 1763)

Synonyms
- Calandra funebris Rey, 1895; Calandra minor Sasaki, 1910; Calandra sasakii Takahashi, 1928; Curculio bituberculatus Fabricius, 1781; Curculio frugilegus De Geer, 1775; Curculio oryza Linnaeus, 1763

= Rice weevil =

Species of beetle

The rice weevil (Sitophilus oryzae) is a stored product pest which attacks seeds of several crops, including wheat, rice, and maize.

== Description ==
The adults are usually between 3–4.6 millimetres (0.12–0.18 in) long, with a long snout. The body color appears to be brown/black, but on close examination, four orange/red spots are arranged in a cross on the wing covers. It is easily confused with the similar looking maize weevil. The maize weevil is typically somewhat larger than the rice weevil, but rice weevils as large as the largest maize weevils and maize weevils nearly as small as the smallest rice weevils have been found. Some external features can be used to differentiate the vast majority of adults, but the only reliable features are on the genitalia (see table below). Both species can hybridize. The genitalic structure of hybrids is unknown.

The larvae are humpbacked and legless with a white to creamy white color. The head is small and tan.

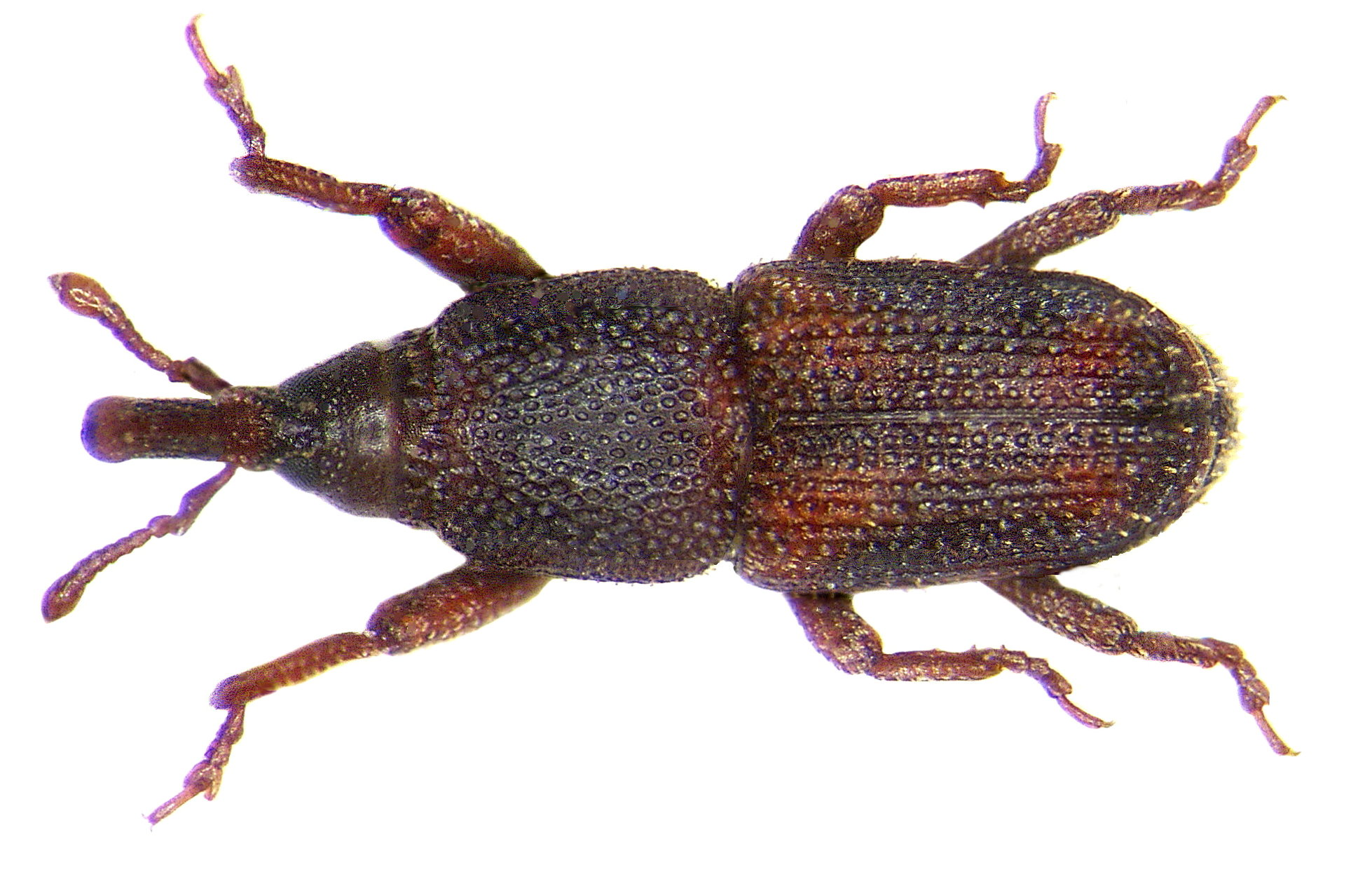
Sitophilus oryzae dorsal view

Rice weevil (S. oryzae)	Maize weevil (S. zeamais)
Longitudinally elliptical punctures on pronotal dorsum	Punctures on pronotal dorsum typically nearly circular, rarely elliptical
Pronotal punctures are separated by a flat, median, longitudinal puncture-free zone	Pronotal punctures are nearly equally spaced apart, and pronotum typically has no median puncture-free area (rarely has a narrow puncture-free median zone)
Less than 20 pronotal punctures along the approximate midline, running from neck to scutellum	More than 20 pronotal punctures along the approximate midline, running from neck to scutellum (not reliable for individuals not reared on corn, which are typically smaller)
Scutellar elevations typically closer together compared to their longitudinal length	Scutellar elevations typically farther apart compared to their longitudinal length
Scutellar elevations typically extend longitudinally approximately more than halfway down the scutellum	Scutellar elevations typically extend longitudinally approximately halfway down the scutellum
Proepimera meet behind the fore coxae and along the posterior edge, have a distinct notch along the posterior edge at the site of the meeting point	Proepimera meet behind the fore coxae and have a barely discernible notch along the posterior edge at the site of the meeting point
Male aedeagus is smooth and shiny on the dorsal surface	Male aedeagus has two dorsal, longitudinal grooves
Epipharyngeal rods of larvae have virtually the same width throughout	Epipharyngeal rods of larvae tapering apically
Lateral lobes of Y-shaped sclerite of female genitalia not tapering and rounded at apex	Lateral lobes of Y-shaped sclerite of female genitalia tapering and pointed at apex
Fewer than five sensory organs at the tip of the labial palps of larvae	More than five sensory organs at the tip of the labial palps of larvae

== Biology ==
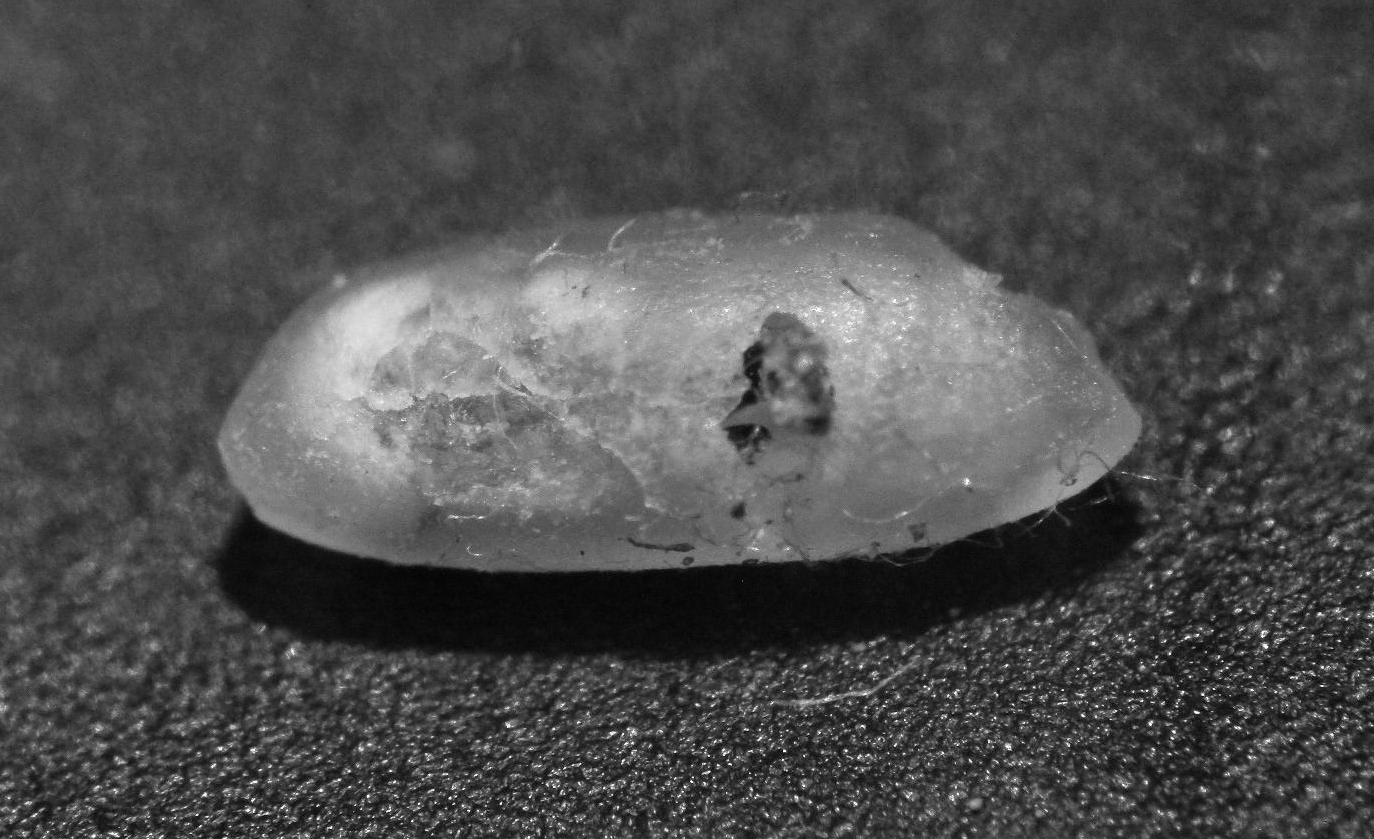
An adult emerges from inside a grain of rice

Adult rice weevils are able to fly, and can live for up to two years. Females lay 2–6 eggs per day and up to 300 over their lifetime. The female uses strong mandibles to chew a hole into a grain kernel after which she deposits a single egg within the hole, sealing it with secretions from her ovipositor. The larva develops within the grain, hollowing it out while feeding. It then pupates within the grain kernel and emerges 2–4 days after eclosion.

Male S. oryzae produce an aggregation pheromone called sitophilure ((4S,5R)-5-Hydroxy-4-methylheptan-3-one) to which males and females are drawn. A synthetic version is available which attracts rice weevils, maize weevils and grain weevils. Females produce a pheromone that attracts only males.

Its gammaproteobacterial symbiont Candidatus Sodalis pierantonius str. SOPE is able to supply the rice weevil with essential vitamins like pantothenic acid, riboflavin, and biotin. During larval development, bacteria rely on up-regulation of type three secretion system genes and genes for flagellum so they can infect insect stem cells.

== Control ==
Control of weevils involves locating and removing all potentially infested food sources. Rice weevils in all stages of development can be killed by freezing infested food below −18 °C (0 °F) for a period of three days, or heating to 60 °C (140 °F) for a period of 15 minutes.

== See also ==
- Granary weevil (Sitophilus granarius)
- Maize weevil (Sitophilus zeamais)
