= List of Lixus species =

This is a list of 952 species in Lixus, a genus of true weevils in the family Curculionidae.

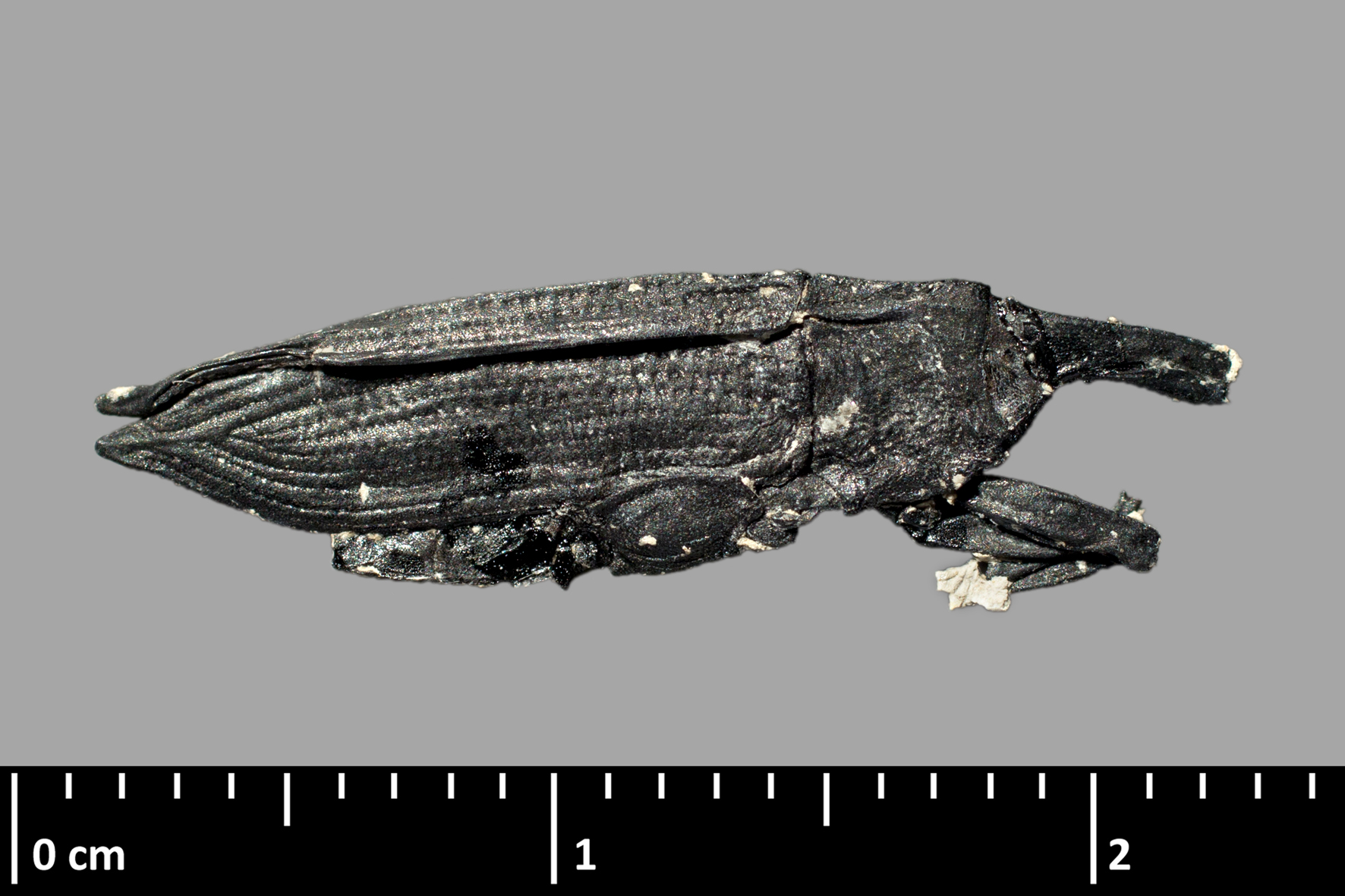
†Lixus (Eulixus) balazuci holotype, Miocene, France

== Lixus species ==
- Lixus abdominalis Boheman, 1835^{c}
- Lixus aberratus Boheman, 1835^{c}
- Lixus achyranthis Marshall, 1930^{c}
- Lixus acicularis Germar, 1824^{c}
- Lixus aciculatirostris Boheman, 1843^{c}
- Lixus acirostris Chittenden, 1930^{c}
- Lixus acuminatus Boheman, 1835^{c}
- Lixus acupictus Villa & Villa, 1833^{c}
- Lixus acutipennis (Roelofs, 1873)
- Lixus acutus Boheman, 1843^{c}
- Lixus adspersus Boheman, 1836^{c}
- Lixus aemulus Petri, 1928^{c}
- Lixus aeneus Cristofori & Jan, 1832^{c}
- Lixus aenigma Kolbe, 1898^{c}
- Lixus aequatorialis Petri, 1928^{c}
- Lixus aeruginosus Capiomont, 1874^{c}
- Lixus aethiopiae Csiki, 1934^{c}
- Lixus aethiopicus Petri, 1912^{c}
- Lixus aethiops Schoenherr, 1835^{c}
- Lixus affinis Boheman, 1843^{c}
- Lixus akonis Kono, 1929^{c}
- Lixus albicornis Fairmaire, 1904^{c}
- Lixus albidus Latreille, 1804^{c}
- Lixus albinae Formánek, 1925^{c}
- Lixus albisetiger Chittenden, 1930^{c}
- Lixus albocinctus Fåhraeus, 1871^{c}
- Lixus alboguttatus Wiedemann, C.R.W., 1821^{c}
- Lixus albolineatus Lea, 1898^{c}
- Lixus albomaculatus Pic, 1923^{c}
- Lixus albomarginatus Boheman, 1843^{c g}
- Lixus albopictus Reitter, 1892^{c}
- Lixus albostriatus Fabricius, J.C., 1801^{c}
- Lixus albovittatus Pic, 1919^{c}
- Lixus algiroides Voss, 1962^{c}
- Lixus algirus Capiomont, 1874^{c}
- Lixus alpinus Hustache, 1929^{c}
- Lixus ambositrensis Hustache, 1920^{c}
- Lixus amitinus Kolbe, 1898^{c}
- Lixus amoenus Faust, 1888^{c}
- Lixus amphora Fabricius, J.C., 1801^{c}
- Lixus amplexus Casey, 1891^{i c}
- Lixus amplirostris Petri, 1904^{c}
- Lixus amurensis Faust, 1887^{c}
- Lixus anguiculus Boheman, 1836^{c}
- Lixus anguinus (Linnaeus, C., 1767)^{c g}
- Lixus angulicollis Faust, 1889^{c}
- Lixus angustatus Dahl,^{c}
- Lixus angusticollis Boheman, 1836^{c}
- Lixus angustus (Herbst, 1795)^{c g}
- Lixus antennatus Motschulsky, 1853^{c}
- Lixus anthracinus Faust, 1889^{c}
- Lixus anthrax Petri, 1928^{c}
- Lixus antilope Fabricius, J.C., 1801^{c}
- Lixus antiodontalgicus Illiger,^{c}
- Lixus apfelbecki Petri, 1904^{c}
- Lixus appendiculatus Boheman, 1843^{c}
- Lixus apterus Champion, 1902^{c}
- Lixus arabs Olivier, 1807^{c}
- Lixus araticollis Marshall, 1940^{c}
- Lixus arcurostris Petri, 1912^{c}
- Lixus arnoldiorum Ter-Minasian, 1966^{c}
- Lixus arundinis Thunberg, 1815^{c}
- Lixus ascanii (Linnaeus, C., 1767)^{c g}
- Lixus ascanioides Villa & Villa in Catteneo, 1844^{c}
- Lixus ascanoides Villa & Villa, 1833^{c}
- Lixus asiaticus Petri, 1904^{c}
- Lixus asper LeConte, 1876^{i c b}
- Lixus aspericollis Chittenden, 1930^{i c}
- Lixus assiniensis Hustache, 1932^{c}
- Lixus astrachanicus Faust, 1883^{c}
- Lixus atriplicis Fabricius, J.C., 1801^{c}
- Lixus attenuatus Ahrens, 1812^{c}
- Lixus atticus Desbrochers, 1893^{c}
- Lixus auctus LeConte, 1857^{c}
- Lixus augurius Boheman, 1835^{c}
- Lixus auricillatus Boheman, 1843^{c}
- Lixus auriculatus Sahlberg, 1823^{c}
- Lixus auritus Boheman, 1836^{c}
- Lixus aurivillii Csiki, 1934^{c}
- Lixus australis Boisduval, 1835^{c}
- Lixus avuncularius Kolbe, 1898^{c}
- Lixus babaulti Hustache, 1936^{c}
- Lixus baculiformis Petri, 1904^{c}
- Lixus baculus Gerstaecker, 1871^{c}
- †Lixus balazuci Voisin & Nel, 1993^{c}
- Lixus balcanicus Petri, 1904^{c}
- Lixus bambalio Germar, 1824^{c}
- Lixus barbarus Olivier, 1807^{c}
- Lixus barbiger Dohrn, 1884^{c}
- Lixus barbirostris Fabricius, J.C., 1801^{c}
- Lixus bardanae (Fabricius, J.C., 1787)^{c g}
- Lixus basilaris Boheman, 1843^{c}
- Lixus beauprei Pic, 1905^{c}
- Lixus biangulifer Marshall, 1936^{c}
- Lixus bicolor Olivier, 1807^{c}
- Lixus bicostalis Petri, 1912^{c}
- Lixus bidens Capiomont, 1874^{c}
- Lixus bidentatus Donovan, 1805^{c}
- Lixus bifasciatus Petri, 1904^{c}
- Lixus bifossatus Kolbe, 1898^{c}
- Lixus bifoveatus Chevrolat, 1881^{c}
- Lixus biimpressus Gyllenhal, 1836^{c}
- Lixus bilineatus Olivier, 1807^{c}
- Lixus bimbiensis Hustache, 1936^{c}
- Lixus binodulus Boheman, 1836^{c}
- Lixus binotatus Boheman, 1835^{c}
- Lixus biplicatus Chevrolat, 1881^{c}
- Lixus bisarmatus Petri, 1928^{c}
- Lixus bischoffi Fall, 1922^{c}
- Lixus bisinuatus Petri, 1928^{c}
- Lixus biskrensis Capiomont, 1874^{c}
- Lixus bisulcatus Faust, 1896^{c}
- Lixus bituberculatus Smreczynski, 1968^{g}
- Lixus bituberosus Fairmaire, 1904^{c}
- Lixus bivirgatus Desbrochers, 1898^{c}
- Lixus blakeae Chittenden, 1928^{c}
- Lixus blatchleyi Csiki, 1934^{c}
- Lixus blondina ^{c}
- Lixus boehmi Hartmann, 1909^{c}
- Lixus bolivianus Petri, 1928^{c}
- Lixus bonguensis Hartmann, 1900^{c}
- Lixus borneanus Petri, 1914^{c}
- Lixus brachyrhinus Boheman, 1843^{c}
- Lixus brachyrrhinus Boheman, 1843^{c}
- Lixus brachysomus Petri, 1928^{c}
- Lixus brasilianus Petri, 1928^{c}
- Lixus brasiliensis Dejean, 1821^{c}
- Lixus breviatus Desbrochers, 1891^{c}
- Lixus brevicaudatus Petri, 1912^{c}
- Lixus brevicaudis Kuester, 1849^{c}
- Lixus breviculus Champion, 1910^{c}
- Lixus brevipennis Ruter, 1939^{c}
- Lixus brevipes Brisout, 1866^{c}
- Lixus brevirostris Boheman, 1836^{c}
- Lixus brevis Petri, 1928^{c}
- Lixus breweri Pascoe, 1874^{c}
- Lixus brunneus (Fabricius, J.C., 1781)^{c g}
- Lixus buccinator Olivier, 1807^{c}
- Lixus buchanani Chittenden, 1930^{i c}
- Lixus caesareus Petri, 1914^{c}
- Lixus caffer Gyllenhal, 1836^{c}
- Lixus caffrarius Csiki, 1904^{c}
- Lixus calandroides Randall, 1838^{c}
- Lixus californicus Motschulsky, 1845^{c}
- Lixus caliginosus Fabricius, J.C., 1801^{c}
- Lixus callosus Boheman, 1845^{c}
- Lixus camerunus Petri, 1912^{c}
- Lixus canaliculatus Boheman, 1843^{c}
- Lixus candidus Olivier, 1807^{c}
- Lixus canescens Fischer de Waldheim, 1835^{c g}
- Lixus canus Wiedemann, 1823^{c}
- Lixus capiomonti Faust, 1883^{c}
- Lixus capitalis Petri, 1928^{c}
- Lixus capitatus Chittenden, 1930^{c}
- Lixus cardui Olivier, 1807^{c}
- Lixus carinatus Boheman, 1836^{c}
- Lixus carinellus Boheman, 1843^{c}
- Lixus carinerostris Boheman, 1843^{c}
- Lixus carinicollis Boheman, 1843^{c}
- Lixus cariniger Petri, 1912^{c}
- Lixus carlinae Olivier, 1807^{c}
- Lixus caroli Hartmann, 1906^{c}
- Lixus carthami Olivier, 1807^{c}
- Lixus castellanus Chevrolat, 1865^{c}
- Lixus catati Hustache, 1920^{c}
- Lixus caucasicus Petri, 1904^{c}
- Lixus caudatus Champion, 1902^{c}
- Lixus caudifer LeConte, 1876^{i c}
- Lixus caudiger Petri, 1928^{c}
- Lixus causticus Faust, 1886^{c}
- Lixus cavatus Petri, 1928^{c}
- Lixus cavicollis Blatchley, 1922^{c}
- Lixus cavipennis Petri, 1928^{c}
- Lixus cenobita Olivier, 1807^{c}
- Lixus centaureae Olivier, 1807^{c}
- Lixus centaurii Olivier, 1807^{c}
- Lixus chawneri Wollaston, 1854^{c}
- Lixus cheiranthi Wollaston, 1854^{c}
- Lixus chevrolati Boheman, 1843^{c}
- Lixus christophi Faust, 1892^{c}
- Lixus chulliati Hustache, 1920^{c}
- Lixus cinerascens Boheman, 1836^{c g}
- Lixus cinereus Latreille, 1804^{c}
- Lixus cinnabarinus Waltl, 1839^{c}
- Lixus circumcinctus Boheman, 1836^{c}
- Lixus circumdatus Schoenherr, 1835^{c}
- Lixus circumscriptus Petri, 1912^{c}
- Lixus clathratus Schoenherr, 1826^{c}
- Lixus clatratus Olivier, 1807^{c}
- Lixus clavipes Fabricius, J.C., 1801^{c}
- Lixus cleoniformis Petri, 1904^{c}
- Lixus cleonoides Chittenden, 1930^{c}
- Lixus coarctatus Klug, 1834^{c}
- Lixus coarcticollis Boheman, 1843^{c}
- Lixus coenobita Olivier, 1807^{c}
- Lixus colchicus Petri, 1904^{c}
- Lixus collaris Petri, 1928^{c}
- Lixus collarti Hustache, 1934^{c}
- Lixus coloradensis Chittenden, 1930^{c}
- Lixus coloratus Petri, 1904^{c}
- Lixus columbianus Petri, 1928^{c}
- Lixus comparabilis Kolbe, 1898^{c}
- Lixus compressicollis J. Thomson, 1858^{c}
- Lixus concavus Say, 1831^{i c b} (rhubarb weevil)
- Lixus confinis Billberg, 1820^{c}
- Lixus conformatus Csiki, 1934^{c}
- Lixus conformis Dejean, 1830^{c}
- Lixus confusus Desbrochers, 1904^{c}
- Lixus conicirostris Olivier, 1807^{c}
- Lixus conicollis Boheman, 1835^{c}
- Lixus conicus Sturm, 1826^{c}
- Lixus coniformis Csiki, 1934^{c}
- Lixus connivens Gyllenhal, 1836^{c}
- Lixus consenescens Boheman, 1835^{c}
- Lixus constrictus Boheman, 1835^{c}
- Lixus contractus Gemminger, 1871^{c g}
- Lixus convexicollis Petri, 1904^{c}
- Lixus copiosus Lea, 1899^{c}
- Lixus coriaceus Klug,^{c}
- Lixus corpulentus Petri, 1912^{c}
- Lixus costalis Boheman, 1835^{c}
- Lixus costatus Germar, 1824^{c}
- Lixus costipennis Petri, 1912^{c}
- Lixus costirostris Seidlitz, 1891^{c}
- Lixus costulatus Kolbe, 1898^{c}
- Lixus cottyi Desbrochers, 1904^{c}
- Lixus coutieri Hustache, 1920^{c}
- Lixus crassipes Megerle,^{c}
- Lixus crassipunctatus Chittenden, 1930^{c}
- Lixus crassulus Notman, 1920^{c}
- Lixus cretaceus Chevrolat, 1866^{c}
- Lixus creteopictus Wollaston, 1867^{c}
- Lixus cribricollis Boheman, 1836^{c}
- Lixus criniger Illiger,^{c}
- Lixus crinipes Quedenfeldt, 1888^{c}
- Lixus cruciferae Hoffmann, 1956^{c}
- Lixus crux Petri, 1928^{c}
- Lixus cuneiformis Fåhraeus, 1871^{c}
- Lixus cuniculinus Olivier, 1807^{c}
- Lixus cuniculus Olivier, 1807^{c}
- Lixus curtipennis Hustache, 1923^{c}
- Lixus curtirostris Tournier, 1878^{c}
- Lixus curtulus Petri, 1928^{c}
- Lixus curvinasus Kolbe, 1898^{c}
- Lixus curvirostris Capiomont, 1874^{c}
- Lixus cylindraceus Boheman, 1836^{c}
- Lixus cylindricus Fabricius, J.C., 1801^{c}
- Lixus cylindroides Schoenherr, 1836^{c}
- Lixus cylindrus Gültekin, 2010^{c}
- Lixus cynarae Latreille, 1804^{c}
- Lixus cynarophilus Capiomont, 1874^{c}
- Lixus davidiani Gultekin & Korotyaev, 2012^{c}
- Lixus deceptus Blatchley & Leng, 1916^{c}
- Lixus declivis Olivier, 1807^{c}
- Lixus decorsei Hustache, 1920^{c}
- Lixus defloratus Olivier, 1807^{c}
- Lixus delatus Kuschel, 1950^{c}
- Lixus denticollis Petri, 1904^{c}
- Lixus dentipes Dejean, 1821^{c}
- Lixus denudatus Zubkov, 1833^{c}
- Lixus depressipennis Roelofs, 1873^{c}
- Lixus depressirostris Petri, 1914^{c}
- Lixus depressus Boheman, 1843^{c}
- Lixus deremius Kolbe, 1898^{c}
- Lixus desbrochersi Hoffmann, 1957^{c}
- Lixus descarpentriesi Hustache, 1920^{c}
- Lixus deserticola Hoffmann, 1957^{c}
- Lixus desertorum Gebler, 1830^{c}
- Lixus devillei Hoffmann, 1955^{c}
- Lixus difficilis Capiomont, 1874^{c}
- Lixus diloris Germar, 1819^{c}
- Lixus discedens Petri, 1912^{c}
- Lixus discolor Boheman, 1836^{c}
- Lixus discrepans Petri, 1928^{c}
- Lixus discretus Petri, 1928^{c}
- Lixus dissimilis Chittenden, 1930^{c}
- Lixus distinctus Germar, 1824^{c}
- Lixus distinguendus Desbrochers, 1893^{c}
- Lixus distortus Csiki, 1934^{c}
- Lixus diutinus Faust, 1883^{c}
- Lixus divaricatus Motschulsky, 1860^{c}
- Lixus dogoanus Hoffmann, 1954^{c}
- Lixus dohrni Faust, 1889^{c}
- Lixus dolus Faust, 1883^{c}
- Lixus dorsalis Dejean, 1837^{c}
- Lixus dorsotinctus Fairmaire, 1904^{c}
- Lixus dregei Boheman, 1843^{c}
- Lixus dubiosus Petri, 1928^{c}
- Lixus dubitabilis Fairmaire, 1875^{c}
- Lixus dubius Fabricius, J.C., 1801^{c}
- Lixus duplicatus Fremuth, 1983^{c}
- Lixus duponti Schoenherr, 1843^{c}
- Lixus elegans Petri, 1928^{c}
- Lixus elegantulus Boheman, 1843^{c}
- Lixus elendeensis Hustache, 1936^{c}
- Lixus elephantulus Chittenden, 1930^{c}
- Lixus elongatulus Petri, 1928^{c}
- Lixus elongatus Germar, 1824^{c}
- Lixus emarginatus Latreille, 1804^{c}
- Lixus emeljanovi Ter-Minasian, 1973^{c}
- Lixus encaustes Faust, 1890^{c}
- Lixus eschscholtzi Boheman, 1836^{c}
- Lixus eschscholtzii Boheman, 1835^{c}
- Lixus eucylindrus Kolbe, 1898^{c}
- Lixus euphorbiae Capiomont, 1874^{c}
- Lixus evanescens Petri, 1928^{c}
- Lixus eversmanni Hochhuth, 1847^{c}
- Lixus ewaldi Alziar, 1978^{c}
- Lixus exaratus Klug, 1850^{c}
- Lixus excavaticollis Boheman, 1843^{c}
- Lixus excelsus Faust, 1891^{c}
- Lixus excoriatus Illiger,^{c}
- Lixus eximius Casey, 1891^{c}
- Lixus eylandti Petri, 1904^{c}
- Lixus fahraei Csiki, 1904^{c}
- Lixus fairmairei Faust, 1890^{c}
- Lixus fallax Boheman, 1843^{c}
- Lixus farinifer Reitter, 1892^{c}
- Lixus fariniferus Desbrochers, 1898^{c}
- Lixus farinosulus Csiki, 1934^{c}
- Lixus farinosus Boisduval, 1835^{c}
- Lixus fasciatus Redtenbacher, 1844^{c}
- Lixus fasciculatus Boheman, 1836^{c}
- Lixus fascifarius Reitter, 1895^{g}
- Lixus fastigatus Petri, 1912^{c}
- Lixus faunus Olivier, 1807^{c}
- Lixus fausti Petri, 1904^{c}
- Lixus favens Boheman, 1835^{c}
- Lixus fecundus Faust, 1892^{c}
- Lixus ferrugatus Fabricius, J.C., 1801^{c}
- Lixus ferrugineus Sturm, 1826^{c}
- Lixus ferulae Ter-Minasian, 1985^{c}
- Lixus ferulaginis Apfelbeck, 1899^{c}
- Lixus figuratus Fåhraeus, 1871^{c}
- Lixus filiformis (Fabricius, J.C., 1781)^{c g}
- Lixus filum Faust, 1884^{c}
- Lixus fimbriolatus Boheman, 1835^{c}
- Lixus fissirostris Petri, 1912^{c}
- Lixus flaveolus Motschulsky, 1849^{c}
- Lixus flavescens Boheman, 1836^{c}
- Lixus flavicornis Boheman, 1843^{c}
- Lixus flavipunctatus Zumpt, 1936^{c}
- Lixus flexipennis Chittenden, 1930^{i c}
- Lixus floccosus Fairmaire, 1904^{c}
- Lixus formaneki Reitter, 1895^{c}
- Lixus formosus Petri, 1928^{c}
- Lixus fossus LeConte, 1876^{i c}
- Lixus foveatostriatus Csiki, 1934^{c}
- Lixus foveinotus Petri, 1928^{c}
- Lixus foveiventris Desbrochers, 1904^{c}
- Lixus foveolaticollis Ter-Minasian, 1972^{c}
- Lixus foveolatus Boheman, 1836^{c}
- Lixus frater Faust, 1895^{c}
- Lixus fraternus Petri, 1912^{c}
- Lixus fumidus Boheman, 1843^{c}
- Lixus furcatus Olivier, 1807^{c}
- Lixus gages Fabricius, J.C., 1801^{c}
- Lixus gandoensis Hustache, 1939^{c}
- Lixus gazella Fabricius, J.C., 1801^{c}
- Lixus gemellatus Gyllenhal, 1836^{c}
- Lixus gemellus Petri, 1928^{c}
- Lixus geminatus Boheman, 1843^{c}
- Lixus gemmellatus Gyllenhal, 1836^{c}
- Lixus germaini Hustache, 1936^{c}
- Lixus germari Boheman, 1843^{c}
- Lixus gerstaeckeri Petri, 1912^{c}
- Lixus ghesquierei Hustache, 1937^{c}
- Lixus gibbirostris Petri, 1904^{c}
- Lixus gibbosus Petri, 1928^{c}
- Lixus gibbus Cristofori & Jan, 1832^{c}
- Lixus giganteus Leoni, 1907^{c}
- Lixus gigas Fairmaire, 1904^{c}
- Lixus glaucus Latreille, 1804^{c}
- Lixus globicollis Petri, 1905^{c}
- Lixus gracilicornis Capiomont, 1874^{c}
- Lixus gracilis Dejean, 1821^{c}
- Lixus grammicus Latreille, 1804^{c}
- Lixus granicollis Aurivillius, 1910^{c}
- Lixus granulatus Olivier, 1807^{c}
- Lixus granulicollis Aurivillius, 1910^{c}
- Lixus gravidus Olivier, 1807^{c}
- Lixus griseosparsus Voss, 1965^{c}
- Lixus gurjevae Ter-Minasian, 1968^{c}
- Lixus guttatus Olivier, 1807^{c}
- Lixus guttiventris Boheman, 1843^{c}
- Lixus guttula Olivier, A.G., 1807^{c}
- Lixus guttulatus Desbrochers, 1899^{c}
- Lixus habilis Hustache, 1937^{c}
- Lixus haematocerus Germar, 1817^{c}
- Lixus haerens Boheman, 1836^{c}
- Lixus hartmanni Petri, 1912^{c}
- Lixus hastatus Petri, 1928^{c}
- Lixus hauseri Voss, 1932^{c}
- Lixus hebetatus Hustache, 1937^{c}
- Lixus helenae Hustache, 1923^{c}
- Lixus helvolus Boheman, 1843^{c}
- Lixus heydeni Faust, 1891^{c}
- Lixus hieroglyphicus Olivier, 1807^{c}
- Lixus hieroglyphus Olivier, 1807^{c}
- Lixus hildebrandti Harold, 1879^{c}
- Lixus hirticaudis Germar, 1824^{c}
- Lixus hirticollis Ménétriés, 1849^{c}
- Lixus hispaniolus Petri, 1928^{c}
- Lixus hissaricus Ter-Minasian, 1966^{c}
- Lixus hottentottus Boheman, 1843^{c}
- Lixus hottentotus Boheman, 1843^{c}
- Lixus hovanus Hustache, 1920^{c}
- Lixus humbloti Hustache, 1920^{c}
- Lixus humerosus Fairmaire, 1904^{c}
- Lixus humilis Petri, 1914^{c}
- Lixus hungarus Petri, 1905^{c}
- Lixus hybridus Petri, 1928^{c}
- Lixus hypocrita Chevrolat, 1866^{c}
- Lixus ibis Petri, 1904^{c}
- Lixus ignavus J.Thomson, 1858^{c}
- Lixus illaudatus Hustache, 1937^{c}
- Lixus imitator Faust, 1892^{c}
- Lixus imitatus Hustache, 1937^{c}
- Lixus immundus Boheman, 1859^{c}
- Lixus impar Desbrochers, 1899^{c}
- Lixus impexus Voss, 1960^{c}
- Lixus imponderosus Lea, 1911^{c}
- Lixus impressicollis Klug, J.C.F., 1829^{c g}
- Lixus impressifrons Petri, 1904^{c g}
- Lixus impressiventris Petri, 1905^{c}
- Lixus impressus Sahlberg, 1823^{c}
- Lixus inaffectatus Hustache, 1936^{c}
- Lixus incanescens Boheman, 1836^{c}
- Lixus incarnatus Gyllenhal, 1836^{c}
- Lixus incurvinasus Csiki, 1934^{c}
- Lixus inermipennis Desbrochers, 1904^{c}
- Lixus inermipes Petri, 1928^{c}
- Lixus inermis Champion, 1902^{c}
- Lixus inflexofemoratus Petri, 1928^{c}
- Lixus infrequens Hoffmann, 1954^{c}
- Lixus inhumeralis Hustache, 1938^{c}
- Lixus inops Schoenherr, 1832^{c}
- Lixus inquinatus Boheman, 1835^{c}
- Lixus insolens Faust, 1899^{c}
- Lixus insularis Capiomont, 1874^{c}
- Lixus intermedius Petri, 1912^{c}
- Lixus invarius Walker, 1871^{c}
- Lixus iridis Olivier, 1807^{c g}
- Lixus irkutensis Faust, 1894^{c}
- Lixus irresectus Boheman, 1836^{c}
- Lixus irroratus Boheman, 1835^{c}
- Lixus isfahanensis Gültekin, 2010^{c}
- Lixus isselii Gestro, 1889^{c}
- Lixus itimbirensis Duvivier, 1892^{c}
- Lixus ivae Chittenden, 1930^{c}
- Lixus jaceae Latreille, 1804^{c}
- Lixus javanus Faust, 1896^{c}
- Lixus jekeli Desbrochers, 1891^{c}
- Lixus jucundus Faust, 1892^{c}
- Lixus julichi Casey, 1891^{i c}
- Lixus julliani Hustache, 1923^{c}
- Lixus juncii Boheman, 1835^{c}
- Lixus kabulensis Voss, 1961^{c}
- Lixus karakumicus Bajtenov & Soyunov, 1990^{c}
- Lixus karelini Boheman, 1835^{c}
- Lixus kasaiensis Hustache, 1934^{c}
- Lixus kazakhstanicus Ter-Minasian, 1970^{c}
- Lixus kenyae Hustache, 1929^{c}
- Lixus kilimanus Kolbe, 1898^{c}
- Lixus kiritshenkoi Ter-Minasian, 1985^{c}
- Lixus kolbei Faust, 1899^{c}
- Lixus kolenati Hochhuth, 1847^{c}
- Lixus kolenatii Hochhuth, 1847^{c}
- Lixus korbi Petri, 1904^{c}
- Lixus korotyaevi Ter-Minasian, 1989^{c}
- Lixus kraatzii Capiomont, 1874^{c}
- Lixus kuatunensis Voss, 1958^{c}
- Lixus kulzeri Zumpt, 1932^{c}
- Lixus lacunosus Petri, 1928^{c}
- Lixus laesicollis LeConte, 1858^{c}
- Lixus laevicollis Petri, 1912^{c}
- Lixus languidus Faust, 1891^{c}
- Lixus laramiensis Casey, 1891^{i c}
- Lixus larinoides Petri, 1914^{c}
- Lixus lateralis Say, 1831^{i c}
- Lixus lateripictus Fairmaire, 1879^{c}
- Lixus laticollis Petri, 1905^{c}
- Lixus latirostris Latreille, 1804^{c}
- Lixus latro Marshall, 1945^{c}
- Lixus laufferi Petri, 1905^{c}
- Lixus lautus Voss, 1958^{c}
- Lixus lecontei Faust, 1883^{c}
- Lixus lefebvrei Boheman, 1835^{c}
- Lixus leleupi Marshall, 1953^{c}
- Lixus leninus Hustache, 1936^{c}
- Lixus lentzi Hustache, 1924^{c}
- Lixus lepidii Motschulsky, 1860^{c}
- Lixus leptosomus Blatchley, 1914^{c}
- Lixus levantinus Petri, 1904^{c}
- †Lixus ligniticus Piton, 1940^{c}
- Lixus likimiensis Hustache, 1937^{c}
- Lixus limbatus Sturm, 1826^{c}
- Lixus limbifer Petri, 1928^{c}
- Lixus lindiensis Hustache, 1938^{c}
- Lixus linearis Olivier, 1807^{c}
- Lixus lineatus Sturm, 1826^{c}
- Lixus lineola Fabricius, J.C., 1801^{c}
- Lixus linnei Faust, 1888^{c}
- Lixus lividus (Yeats, T.P., 1776)^{c g}
- Lixus lodingi Chittenden, 1930^{c}
- Lixus longicollis Kolbe, 1898^{c}
- Lixus longipennis Hustache, 1939^{c}
- Lixus longulus Klug, J.C.F., 1829^{c g}
- Lixus loratus Germar, 1824^{c}
- Lixus loricatus Schneider,^{c}
- Lixus luculentus Casey, 1891^{c}
- Lixus lugens Petri, 1912^{c}
- Lixus lukjanovitshi Ter-Minasian, 1966^{c}
- Lixus lupinus Blatchley, 1914^{c}
- Lixus lusingaensis Voss, 1962^{c}
- Lixus lutescens Capiomont, 1874^{c}
- Lixus luzonicus Faust, 1895^{c}
- Lixus lycophoeus Boheman, 1835^{c}
- Lixus lycophorus Boheman, 1836^{c}
- Lixus lymexylon Fabricius, J.C., 1801^{c}
- Lixus macer LeConte, 1876^{i c b}
- Lixus macilentus Olivier, 1807^{c}
- Lixus maculatus Roelofs, 1873^{c}
- Lixus maculipennis Champion, 1902^{c}
- Lixus madagassus Faust, 1889^{c}
- Lixus madaranus Kono, 1929^{c}
- Lixus madidus Olivier, 1807^{c}
- Lixus maicopicus Ter-Minasian, 1966^{c}
- Lixus malatianus Faust, 1890^{c}
- Lixus malignus Faust, 1894^{c}
- Lixus manifestus Kirsch, 1868^{c}
- Lixus margaritae Davidyan in Korotyaev, Ismailova, Arzanov, Davidyan & Prasolov, 1993^{c}
- Lixus marginalis Curtis, 1837^{c}
- Lixus marginatus Say, 1831^{i c b}
- Lixus marginemaculatus Bach, 1854^{c}
- Lixus maritimus Fall, 1913^{i c}
- Lixus marmoratus Latreille, 1804^{c}
- Lixus marqueti Desbrochers, 1870^{c}
- Lixus massaicus Kolbe, 1898^{c}
- Lixus mastersi Pascoe, 1874^{c}
- Lixus maurus Olivier, 1807^{c}
- Lixus melanocephalus Fabricius, J.C., 1801^{c}
- Lixus meles Boheman, 1836^{c}
- Lixus mephitis Chittenden, 1930^{c}
- Lixus meregallii Fremuth, 1983^{c}
- Lixus merula Suffrian, 1871^{i c b}
- Lixus mesopotamicus Olivier, 1807^{c}
- Lixus mexicanus Boheman, 1843^{c}
- Lixus miagri Laporte, 1840^{c}
- Lixus microlepis Ter-Minasian, 1973^{c}
- Lixus mimicanus Marshall, 1915^{c}
- Lixus miniatocinctus Desbrochers, 1866^{c}
- Lixus minutus Escalera, 1914^{c}
- Lixus mixtus Leconte, 1876^{c}
- Lixus mocquerysi Hustache, 1920^{c}
- Lixus modestus Mannerheim, 1843^{c}
- Lixus mogadorus Heyden, 1887^{c}
- Lixus moivanus Kôno, 1928^{c}
- Lixus moiwanus Kôno, 1928^{c}
- Lixus montanus Aurivillius, 1926^{c}
- Lixus monticola Kirsch, 1878^{c}
- Lixus morbillosus Latreille, 1804^{c}
- Lixus morettiae Voss, 1964^{c}
- Lixus morosus Olivier, 1807^{c}
- Lixus morulus Blatchley & Leng, 1916^{c}
- Lixus motacilla Schoenherr, 1832^{c}
- Lixus mucidus LeConte, 1876^{i c b}
- Lixus mucoreus Pascoe, 1885^{c}
- Lixus mucronatus Fabricius, J.C., 1801^{c g}
- Lixus muongus Heller, 1922^{c}
- Lixus musculus Say, 1831^{i c b}
- Lixus mutabiis Petri, 1928^{c}
- Lixus mutabilis Petri, 1928^{c}
- Lixus myagri Olivier, 1807^{c}
- Lixus nanus Boheman, 1836^{c}
- Lixus nathaliae Hustache, 1956^{c}
- Lixus nebulifasciatus Walker, 1859^{c}
- Lixus nebulosus Latreille, 1804^{c}
- Lixus neglectus Cristofori & Jan, 1832^{c}
- Lixus nettadorchinae Friedman & Colonnelli, 2025
- Lixus niansanus Kolbe, 1898^{c}
- Lixus nigricornis Desbrochers, 1893^{c}
- Lixus nigrinus Champion, 1902^{c}
- Lixus nigripes Hustache, 1933^{c}
- Lixus nigritarsis Boheman, 1835^{c}
- Lixus nigrolineatus Voss, 1967^{c}
- Lixus niloticus Chevrolat, 1873^{c}
- Lixus nitidirostris Kolbe, 1898^{c}
- Lixus nitidulus Casey, 1891^{i c b}
- Lixus noctuinus Petri, 1904^{c}
- Lixus nordmanni Hochhuth, 1847^{c}
- Lixus notatus Fabricius, J.C., 1801^{c}
- Lixus novellus Blatchley, 1925^{c}
- Lixus nubeculosus Illiger,^{c}
- Lixus nubianus Capiomont, 1875^{c}
- Lixus nubilosus Boheman, 1835^{c}
- Lixus nycterophorus Reiche, 1850^{c}
- Lixus obesulus Casey, 1891^{i c}
- Lixus obesus Petri, 1904^{c}
- Lixus obliquenubilus Quedenfeldt, 1888^{c}
- Lixus obliquivittis Voss, 1937^{c}
- Lixus obliquus Olivier, 1807^{c}
- Lixus oblongus Petri, 1905^{c}
- Lixus obovatus Hustache, 1933^{c}
- Lixus obsoletus Endrödi, 1959^{c}
- Lixus ocellatus Chittenden, 1930^{c}
- Lixus ochraceus Boheman, 1843^{c}
- Lixus octolineatus (Olivier, A.G., 1791)^{c g}
- Lixus ocularis Germar, 1819^{c}
- Lixus odontalgicus Olivier, 1807^{c}
- Lixus olivieri Faust, 1891^{c}
- Lixus onopordi Olivier, 1807^{c}
- Lixus opacirostris Hustache, 1939^{c}
- Lixus opacus Petri, 1912^{c}
- Lixus operculifer Petri, 1904^{c}
- Lixus ophthalmicus Latreille, 1804^{c}
- Lixus orbitalis Boheman, 1835^{c}
- Lixus ordinatipennis Chittenden, 1930^{c}
- Lixus oregonus Casey, 1891^{i c}
- Lixus orientalis Dejean, 1821^{c}
- Lixus overlaeti Hustache, 1934^{c}
- Lixus pacificus Olivier, 1807^{c}
- Lixus pallasi Faust, 1890^{c}
- Lixus pallens Boheman, 1843^{c}
- Lixus pallipes Zumpt, 1938^{c}
- Lixus palmatus Olivier, 1807^{c}
- Lixus palpebratus Boheman, 1836^{c}
- Lixus palumbus Olivier, 1807^{c}
- Lixus papei Petri, 1912^{c}
- Lixus papillifer Petri, 1912^{c}
- Lixus paradoxus Kolbe, 1898^{c}
- Lixus paraguayanus Petri, 1928^{c}
- Lixus parallelus Dejean, 1830^{c}
- Lixus paraplecticus (Linnaeus, C., 1758)^{c g}
- Lixus parcus LeConte, 1876^{i c b} (knotweed weevil)
- Lixus pardalis Boheman, 1836^{c}
- Lixus parilis Faust, 1899^{c}
- Lixus parummaculatus Voss, 1962^{c}
- Lixus paulmeyeri Petri, 1905^{c}
- Lixus paulonotatus Pic, 1904^{c}
- Lixus pedronii Talamelli, 2008^{c}
- Lixus peninsularis Fall, 1913^{c}
- Lixus peraffinis Hustache, 1939^{c}
- Lixus peregrinus Boheman, 1836^{c}
- Lixus perforatus LeConte, 1876^{i c b}
- Lixus peristriatus Chittenden, 1930^{c}
- Lixus perjurus Hustache, 1936^{c}
- Lixus perlongus Fall, 1913^{i c}
- Lixus perparvulus Desbrochers, 1870^{c}
- Lixus perplexus Faust, 1888^{c}
- Lixus perrieri Hustache, 1920^{c}
- Lixus peruvianus Petri, 1928^{c}
- Lixus pervestitus Chittenden, 1930^{i c b}
- Lixus petiolicola Gultekin & Korotyaev, 2011^{c}
- Lixus petrii Csiki, 1904^{c}
- Lixus pica Fabricius, J.C., 1801^{c}
- Lixus piceicornis Billberg, 1820^{c}
- Lixus pictipennis Hustache, 1934^{c}
- Lixus pierrei Roudier, 1954^{c}
- Lixus pilosellus Petri, 1928^{c}
- Lixus pilosulus Faust, 1895^{c}
- Lixus pinguinasus Petri, 1912^{c}
- Lixus pinguirostris Petri, 1912^{c}
- Lixus pinguis Gerstaecker, 1871^{c}
- Lixus pinkeri Voss, 1965^{g}
- Lixus pisanus Schneider,^{c}
- Lixus pistrinarius Boheman, 1835^{c}
- Lixus placidus LeConte, 1876^{i c b}
- Lixus plagiatus Fåhraeus, 1871^{c}
- Lixus planicollis Chittenden, 1930^{c}
- Lixus planifrons Petri, 1928^{c}
- Lixus plicatulus Petri, 1928^{c}
- Lixus plicatus Latreille, 1804^{c}
- Lixus plucheae Chittenden, 1930^{c}
- Lixus pollinosus Germar, 1819^{c}
- Lixus polylineatus Petri, 1904^{c}
- Lixus porcatus Boheman, 1843^{c}
- Lixus porculus Latreille, 1804^{c}
- Lixus poricollis Mannerheim, 1843^{c}
- Lixus posticus Faust, 1884^{c}
- Lixus pracuae Faust, 1891^{c}
- Lixus praepotens Boheman, 1836^{c}
- Lixus probus Faust, 1886^{c}
- Lixus productus Stephens, 1829^{c}
- Lixus professus Faust, 1883^{c}
- Lixus profundus Chittenden, 1930^{c}
- Lixus propinquus Petri, 1912^{c}
- Lixus pubirostris Petri, 1904^{c}
- Lixus pudens Fåhraeus, 1871^{c}
- Lixus pulcher Aurivillius, 1910^{c}
- Lixus pulverulentus Olivier, 1807^{c g}
- Lixus pulvinatus Boheman, 1836^{c}
- Lixus pulvisculosus Boheman, 1835^{c}
- Lixus punctatulus Petri, 1914^{c}
- Lixus punctatus Fischer de Waldheim, 1843^{c}
- Lixus puncticeps Hustache, 1939^{c}
- Lixus puncticollis Brisout, 1866^{c}
- Lixus punctinasus LeConte, 1876^{i c b}
- Lixus punctirostris Boheman, 1843^{c}
- Lixus punctiventris Germar, 1824^{c}
- Lixus punctulatus (Fabricius, J.C., 1787)^{c g}
- Lixus pungoanus Harold, 1879^{c}
- Lixus purus Petri, 1914^{c}
- Lixus pusio Blatchley, 1928^{c}
- Lixus pygmaeus Casey, 1891^{c}
- Lixus pyrrhocnemis Boheman, 1843^{c}
- Lixus quadraticollis Desbrochers, 1904^{c}
- Lixus quadratipunctatus Chittenden, 1930^{c}
- Lixus quadricollis Champion, 1902^{c}
- Lixus quadrifoveatus Petri, 1928^{c}
- Lixus quadripustulatus Fabricius, J.C., 1801^{c}
- Lixus querulus Faust, 1899^{c}
- Lixus rasilis Faust, 1899^{c}
- Lixus ravicularis Sturm, 1826^{c}
- Lixus ravus Petri, 1928^{c}
- Lixus rectirostris Desbrochers, 1905^{c}
- Lixus rectodorsalis Petri, 1904^{c}
- Lixus rectus Leconte, 1876^{c}
- Lixus recurvatus Schoenherr,^{c}
- Lixus recurvus Olivier, 1807^{c}
- Lixus redivivus Petri, 1914^{c}
- Lixus regularipennis Chittenden, 1930^{c}
- Lixus reichei Capiomont, 1874^{c}
- Lixus remaudierei Hoffmann, 1948^{c}
- Lixus reticulatus Fabricius, J.C., 1801^{c}
- Lixus reymondi Hoffmann, 1954^{c}
- Lixus rhombifer Petri, 1912^{c}
- Lixus rhomboidalis Boheman, 1843^{c}
- Lixus rhynchaenus Petri, 1912^{c}
- Lixus ritsemae Pascoe, 1883^{c}
- Lixus roccatii Camerano, 1907^{c}
- Lixus rojasi Jekel, 1860^{c}
- Lixus roreus Fabricius, J.C., 1801^{c}
- Lixus roridus Latreille, 1804^{c}
- Lixus rosenschoeldi Boheman, 1843^{c}
- Lixus rothschildi Aurivillius, 1912^{c}
- Lixus rubellus Randall, 1838^{i c b}
- Lixus rubicundus Dejean, 1821^{c}
- Lixus rubiginosus Dejean, 1821^{c}
- Lixus rubripennis Petri, 1914^{c}
- Lixus rubripes Desbrochers, 1905^{c}
- Lixus rubrolateralis Reitter, 1909^{c}
- Lixus rudiculus Petri, 1912^{c}
- Lixus rufescens Boheman, 1835^{c}
- Lixus ruficornis Boheman, 1836^{c}
- Lixus rufitarsis Boheman, 1835^{c}
- Lixus rufotibialis Csiki, 1934^{c}
- Lixus rufulus Boheman, 1835^{c}
- Lixus rugicollis Boheman, 1836^{c}
- Lixus rugifer Petri, 1905^{c}
- Lixus rugulicollis Petri, 1912^{c}
- Lixus rugulirostris Champion, 1902^{c}
- Lixus rumicis Hoffmann, 1956^{c}
- Lixus runzoriensis Marshall, 1909^{c}
- Lixus sabulosus Dejean,^{c}
- Lixus sagax Faust, 1899^{c}
- Lixus saintpierrei Capiomont, 1874^{c}
- Lixus salentinus Costa, 1839^{c}
- Lixus salicorniae Faust, 1888^{c}
- Lixus salsolae Becker, 1867^{c}
- Lixus sandoaensis Hustache, 1934^{c}
- Lixus sanghaiensis Hustache, 1936^{c}
- Lixus sanguineus Schoenherr, 1835^{c}
- Lixus sardiniensis Boheman, 1843^{c}
- Lixus scabricollis Schneider, 1828^{c}
- Lixus scapularis Faust, 1887^{c}
- Lixus schach Faust, 1886^{c}
- Lixus schaeferi Hoffmann, 1950^{c}
- Lixus schoenherri Redtenbacher, 1867^{c}
- Lixus schouwiae Hoffmann, 1962^{c}
- Lixus scissifrons Petri, 1912^{c}
- Lixus scolopax Boheman, 1835^{c g}
- Lixus scolymi Olivier, 1807^{c}
- Lixus scoparii Dejean, 1821^{c}
- Lixus scrobicollis Boheman, 1836^{i c b} (ragweed weevil)
- Lixus scrobirostris Capiomont, 1874^{c}
- Lixus sculptirostris Petri, 1914^{c}
- Lixus sculpturatus Petri, 1928^{c}
- Lixus scutellaris Petri, 1905^{c}
- Lixus scutulatus Petri, 1905^{c}
- Lixus secretus Faust, 1896^{c}
- Lixus sedentarius Hustache, 1934^{c}
- Lixus segnis Germar, 1824^{c}
- Lixus sejugatus Faust, 1889^{c}
- Lixus semilunatus Petri, 1904^{c}
- Lixus semipunctatus Fabricius, J.C., 1801^{c}
- Lixus semivittatus Casey, 1891^{i c b}
- Lixus seniculus Boheman, 1835^{c}
- Lixus senilis Latreille, 1804^{c}
- Lixus separabilis Petri, 1928^{c}
- Lixus separatus Petri, 1914^{c}
- Lixus sericatus Boheman, 1845^{c}
- Lixus seriemaculatus Petri, 1913^{c}
- Lixus seriesignatus Boheman, 1835^{c}
- Lixus serripes Desbrochers, 1898^{c}
- Lixus severini Faust, 1899^{c}
- Lixus sexualis Casey, 1891^{c}
- Lixus seydeli Hustache, 1934^{c}
- Lixus siamensis Desbrochers, 1898^{c}
- Lixus sibiricus Ballion, 1878^{c}
- Lixus sicanus Capiomont, 1874^{c}
- Lixus siculus Boheman, 1836^{c}
- Lixus simplex Boheman, 1843^{c}
- Lixus sinuatus Motschulsky, 1849^{c}
- Lixus sitta Sahlberg, 1823^{c}
- Lixus smirnoffi Hoffmann, 1962^{c}
- Lixus snae Merceron, ????^{c}
- Lixus sobrinus Casey, 1891^{i c}
- Lixus soror Casey, 1891^{c}
- Lixus spartii Olivier, 1807^{c}
- Lixus spartiiformis Hoffmann, 1956^{c}
- Lixus speciosus Miller, 1861^{c}
- Lixus spectabiilis Boheman, 1836^{c}
- Lixus spectabilis Boheman, 1835^{c}
- Lixus spinimanus Boheman, 1836^{c}
- Lixus spinipennis Petri, 1928^{c}
- Lixus staudingeri Petri, 1912^{c}
- Lixus strangulatus Faust, 1883^{c}
- Lixus striatellus Olivier, 1807^{c}
- Lixus striatopunctatus Desbrochers, 1904^{c}
- Lixus stupor Boheman, 1836^{c}
- Lixus sturmi Boheman, 1836^{c}
- Lixus sturmii Boheman, 1835^{c}
- Lixus subacutiformis Petri, 1928^{c}
- Lixus subacutus Boheman, 1843^{c}
- Lixus subangulatus Motschulsky, 1849^{c}
- Lixus subangustatus Motschulsky, 1849^{c}
- Lixus subcalvus Petri, 1928^{c}
- Lixus subcarinicollis Petri, 1928^{c}
- Lixus subcaudatus Boheman, 1843^{c}
- Lixus subconvexus Petri, 1912^{c}
- Lixus subcostatus Petri, 1912^{c}
- Lixus subcuneatus Faust, 1889^{c}
- Lixus subcuspidatus Voss, 1932^{c}
- Lixus subcylindricus Petri, 1908^{c}
- Lixus subdentatus Petri, 1904^{c}
- Lixus subfarinosus Desbrochers, 1893^{c}
- Lixus subfasciatus Cristofori & Jan, 1832^{c}
- Lixus sublimbellus Voss, 1962^{c}
- Lixus sublimis Petri, 1928^{c}
- Lixus sublinearis Petri, 1928^{c}
- Lixus sublobatus Petri, 1928^{c}
- Lixus subloratus Petri, 1928^{c}
- Lixus submaculatus Boheman, 1843^{c}
- Lixus submucronatus Petri, 1928^{c}
- Lixus subnebulosus Kolbe, 1883^{c}
- Lixus subornatus Hoffmann, 1962^{c}
- Lixus subpruinosus Petri, 1912^{c}
- Lixus subquadratithorax Desbrochers, 1895^{c}
- Lixus subrectinasus Desbrochers, 1899^{c}
- Lixus subsignatus Fåhraeus, 1871^{c}
- Lixus subtilis Sturm, 1826^{c}
- Lixus subulatus Faust, 1891^{c}
- Lixus subulipennis Boheman, 1835^{c}
- Lixus suetus Boheman, 1843^{c}
- Lixus suillus Illiger,^{c}
- Lixus sulcaticollis Petri, 1928^{c}
- Lixus sulcatus Kirsch, 1868^{c}
- Lixus sulciger Kolbe, 1898^{c}
- Lixus sulcimargo Champion, 1902^{c}
- Lixus sulcinasus Faust, 1896^{c}
- Lixus sulcirostris Latreille, 1804^{c}
- Lixus sulphuratus Boheman, 1836^{c}
- Lixus sulphureovittis Brancsik, 1900^{c}
- Lixus sumatrensis Petri, 1912^{c}
- Lixus superciliosus Boheman, 1836^{c}
- Lixus sylvestris Marshall, 1941^{c}
- Lixus sylvius Boheman, 1843^{c}
- Lixus tabidus Latreille, 1804^{c}
- Lixus taeniatus Champion, 1902^{c}
- Lixus talamellii Colonnelli in Magnano, Colonneli & Caldara in van Harten (ed.), 2009^{c}
- Lixus talyshensis Ter-Minasian, 1966^{c}
- Lixus tanarivensis Hustache, 1920^{c}
- Lixus tardus Suffrian, 1871^{c}
- Lixus tasmanicus Germar, 1848^{c}
- Lixus tatariae Steven, 1829^{c}
- Lixus tauricus Petri, 1904^{c}
- Lixus temerarius Petri, 1928^{c}
- Lixus temporalis Hustache, 1939^{c}
- Lixus tenellus Casey, 1891^{i c b}
- Lixus tenuicollis Boheman, 1836^{c}
- Lixus tenuipes Hartmann, 1897^{c}
- Lixus tenuirostris Boheman, 1836^{c}
- Lixus teretiusculus Boheman, 1835^{c}
- Lixus terminalis LeConte, 1876^{i c b}
- Lixus terminatus Csiki, 1934^{c}
- Lixus tibialis Boheman, 1843^{c}
- Lixus tibiellus Desbrochers, 1904^{c}
- Lixus tigrinus Olivier, 1807^{c}
- Lixus titubans Faust, 1890^{c}
- Lixus toltecus Champion, 1902^{c}
- Lixus torvus Boheman, 1836^{c}
- Lixus transsylvanicus Tournier,^{c}
- Lixus triangulifer Petri, 1912^{c}
- Lixus tricolor Sturm, 1826^{c}
- Lixus tricostalis Thunberg, 1815^{c}
- Lixus tricristatus Chittenden, 1930^{c}
- Lixus trilineatus Sturm, 1826^{c}
- Lixus trilobus Fabricius, J.C., 1801^{c}
- Lixus trinarius Petri, 1905^{c}
- Lixus tristis Boheman, 1836^{c}
- Lixus trivialis Fåhraeus, 1871^{c}
- Lixus trivittatus Capiomont, 1874^{c}
- Lixus truncatellus Schoenherr, 1826^{c}
- Lixus truncatulus Fabricius, J.C., 1801^{c}
- Lixus tschemkenticus Faust, 1883^{c}
- Lixus tubulatus Petri, 1928^{c}
- Lixus tunisiensis Desbrochers, 1893^{c}
- Lixus turanicus Reitter, 1888^{c}
- Lixus turbatus Dejean, 1821^{c}
- Lixus turkestanicus Desbrochers, 1898^{c}
- Lixus tusicollis Marshall, 1955^{c}
- Lixus ukamicus Faust, 1899^{c}
- Lixus ulcerosus Petri, 1904^{c}
- Lixus umbellatarum (Fabricius, J.C., 1787)^{c g}
- Lixus uncticollis Petri, 1928^{c}
- Lixus uniformis Boheman, 1843^{c}
- Lixus ursus Latreille, 1804^{c}
- Lixus usambicus Kolbe, 1898^{c}
- Lixus vachshensis Ter-Minasian, 1966^{c}
- Lixus vacillatus Hustache, 1939^{c}
- Lixus validirostris Capiomont, 1874^{c}
- Lixus validus Harold, 1879^{c}
- Lixus varicolor Boheman, 1836^{c}
- Lixus vaulogeri Hustache, 1938^{c}
- Lixus vectiformis Wollaston, 1854^{c}
- Lixus ventralis Winkler, 1932^{c}
- Lixus ventriculus Petri, 1912^{c}
- Lixus venustulus Boheman, 1835^{c}
- Lixus vestitus Dejean, 1830^{c}
- Lixus vetula Matsumura, 1910^{c}
- Lixus vibex Schoenherr, 1835^{c}
- Lixus vicinus Dejean, 1830^{c}
- Lixus vilis (Rossi, P., 1790)^{c g}
- Lixus villosulus Desbrochers, 1904^{c}
- Lixus virens Boheman, 1835^{c}
- Lixus vittatus Motschulsky, 1845^{c}
- Lixus vittiger Guerin-Meneville, 1833^{c}
- Lixus volvulus Fabricius, J.C., 1801^{c}
- Lixus vulneratus Schoenherr, 1835^{c}
- Lixus vulpes Olivier, 1807^{c}
- Lixus vulpinus Pascoe, 1885^{c}
- Lixus vultur Petri, 1912^{c}
- Lixus wahlbergi Boheman, 1845^{c}
- Lixus weisei Hartmann, 1904^{c}
- Lixus xambeui Hoffmann, 1955^{c}
- Lixus xanthocheloides Hustache, 1936^{c}
- Lixus xantusi Petri, 1904^{c}
- Lixus yunnanensis Voss, 1932^{c}
- Lixus zaitzevi Petri, 1906^{c}
- Lixus zoubkoffi Boheman, 1835^{c}
- Lixus zubkoffi Boheman, 1836^{c}

Data sources: i = ITIS, c = Catalogue of Life, g = GBIF, b = Bugguide.net
