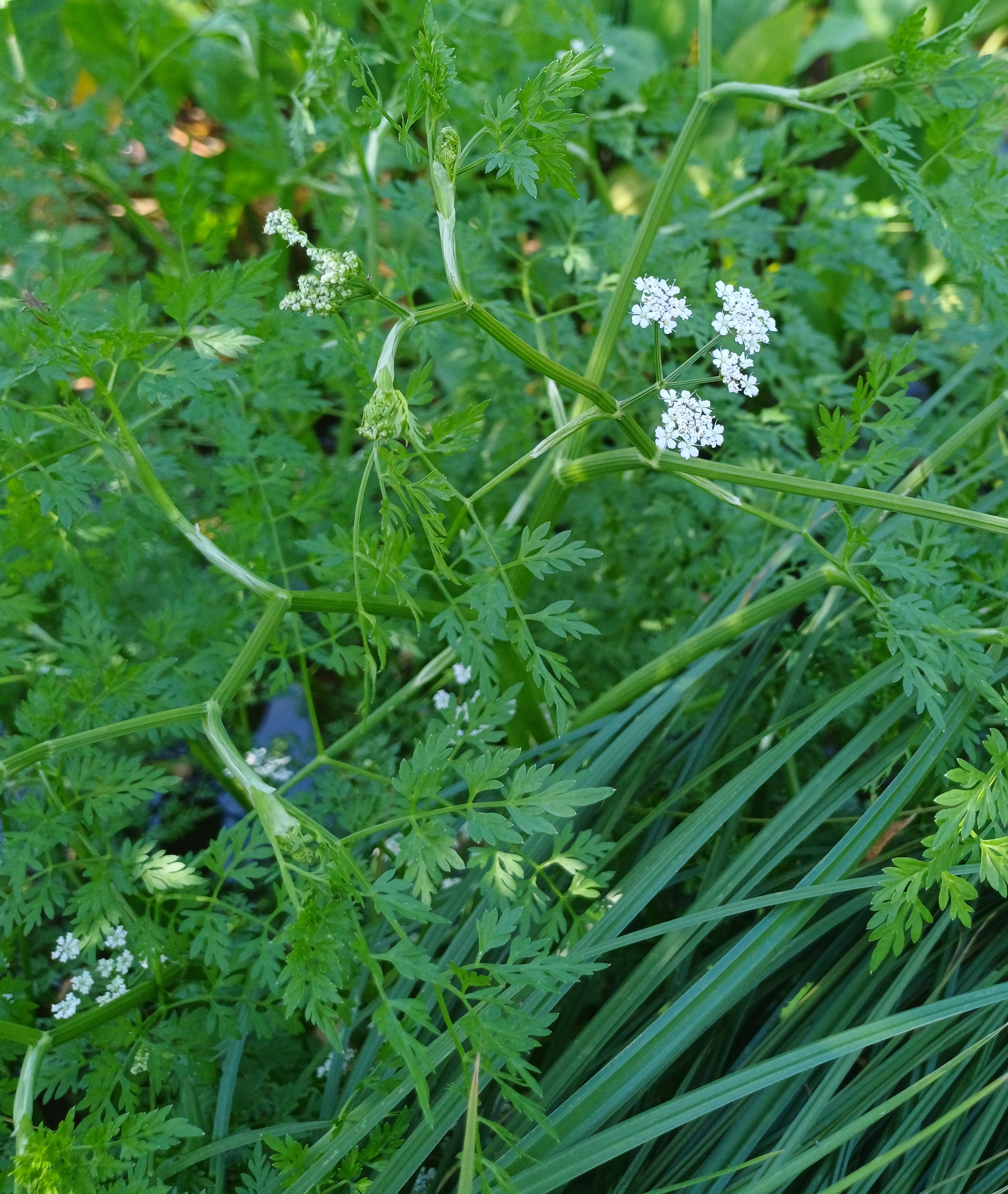

Conservation status
- Least Concern (IUCN 3.1)

Scientific classification
- Kingdom: Plantae
- Clade: Embryophytes
- Clade: Tracheophytes
- Clade: Spermatophytes
- Clade: Angiosperms
- Clade: Eudicots
- Clade: Asterids
- Order: Apiales
- Family: Apiaceae
- Genus: Oenanthe
- Species: O. aquatica

Binomial name
- Oenanthe aquatica L.

= Oenanthe aquatica =

Species of flowering plant

Oenanthe aquatica, fine-leaved water-dropwort, is an aquatic flowering plant in the carrot family. It is widely distributed from the Atlantic coast of Europe to central Asia, and grows in reedbeds or pools with a fluctuating water level, sometimes becoming abundant on drying mud.

== Description ==
Fine-leaved water-dropwort is a hairless, annual to perennial herb about 150 cm tall. Young plants have tubers, which disappear by mid-summer. The stem is hollow and striated, normally about 1 cm in diameter but exceptionally reaching 8 cm, erect or sprawling, rooting at the nodes of any submerged sections. Very large sprawling plants have been found to have stems up to 2 m long.

The upper (aerial) leaves are 2- to 3-pinnate, finely divided into lanceolate (sword-shaped) to ovate leaflets up to 5 mm long; the lower leaves are 3–4 pinnate, with very narrow (thread-like) leaflets under water, but flat, ovate leaf segments if emergent. The leaf stalks form a sheath around the stem at the base.

It flowers between June and September in northern Europe, the inflorescence arising from the leaf axils or at the tip of the stem. It consists of a compound umbel of 6–16 smaller rounded umbels about 1–2 cm in diameter, each of which has numerous white flowers. There are no bracts on the main umbel and 4–8 small, lanceolate bracteoles at the base of each of the secondary umbels. Plants are monoecious, with bisexual and male flowers in most umbels. Each flower has five sepals, five unequal petals with the outer ones slightly larger, five stamens and two styles. After flowering, the rays (stalks of the individual umbels) and pedicels (stalks to the individual flowers) do not thicken, and the umbels do not become flat-topped in fruit.

The fruits are 3–5.5 mm long, ovoid, with prominent ridges. On maturity, each fruit splits into two (1-seeded) mericarps.

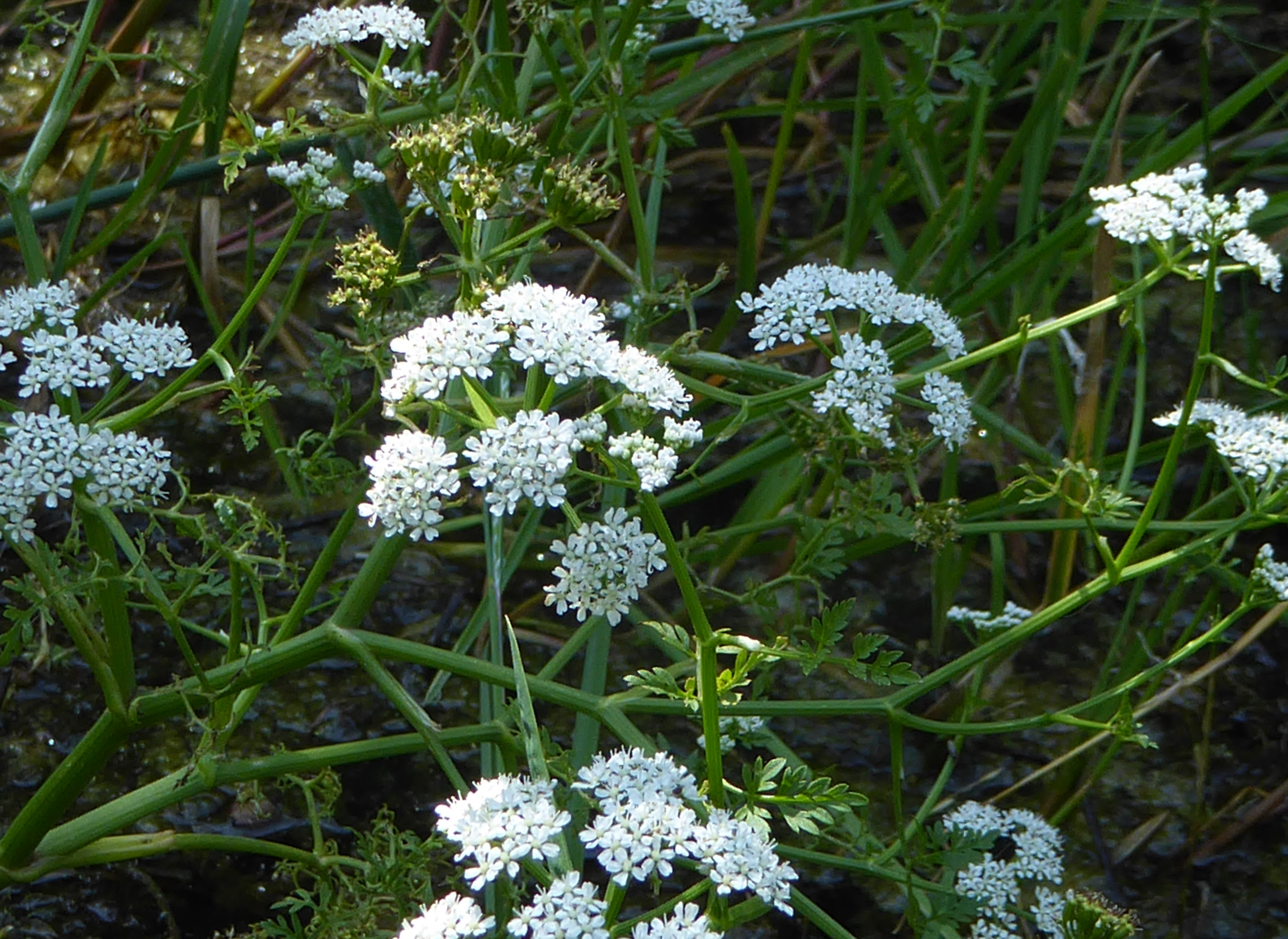
A sprawling plant of fine-leaved Water-dropwort at Ashford, Kent, England

Reproduction is entirely by seed; well-grown plants have been found to produce as many as 40,000 seeds.

== Taxonomy ==
The basis for the modern classification of the Apaiceae was developed by Artedius in the early 18th century and his name for fine-leaved water-dropwort (the basionym), Phellandrium aquaticum, was published after his death by Linnaeus in Species Plantarum in 1753. However, in 1798 it was placed in the genus Oenanthe (as O. aquatique) by Jean Louis Marie Poiret in the 4th volume of Lamarck's Encyclopédie méthodique Botanique, and it has stayed there ever since.

It has several synonyms (i.e. other authors have named the same plant, but Poiret's name for it stands), including Ligusticum phellandrium (Lam.) Crantz. (1762), Phellandrium divaricatum Gray (1851) and Selinum phellandrium (Lam.) E.H.L. Krause (1904). A full list can be found in the Synonymic Checklists of the Plants of the World.

A couple of varieties have been named but are not widely used. It is not known to hybridise with any other species.

Its chromosome number is 2n = 22 (based on British specimens).

The generic name Oenanthe, which comes from the Ancient Greek οίνος, "wine" and άνθος, "flower", was used in ancient times for certain Mediterranean plants and later adopted to describe this genus; but it carries no meaning. The specific epithet "aquatica" is the feminine form (nominative, singular) of the Latin word aquaticus, meaning "of water".

== Identification ==
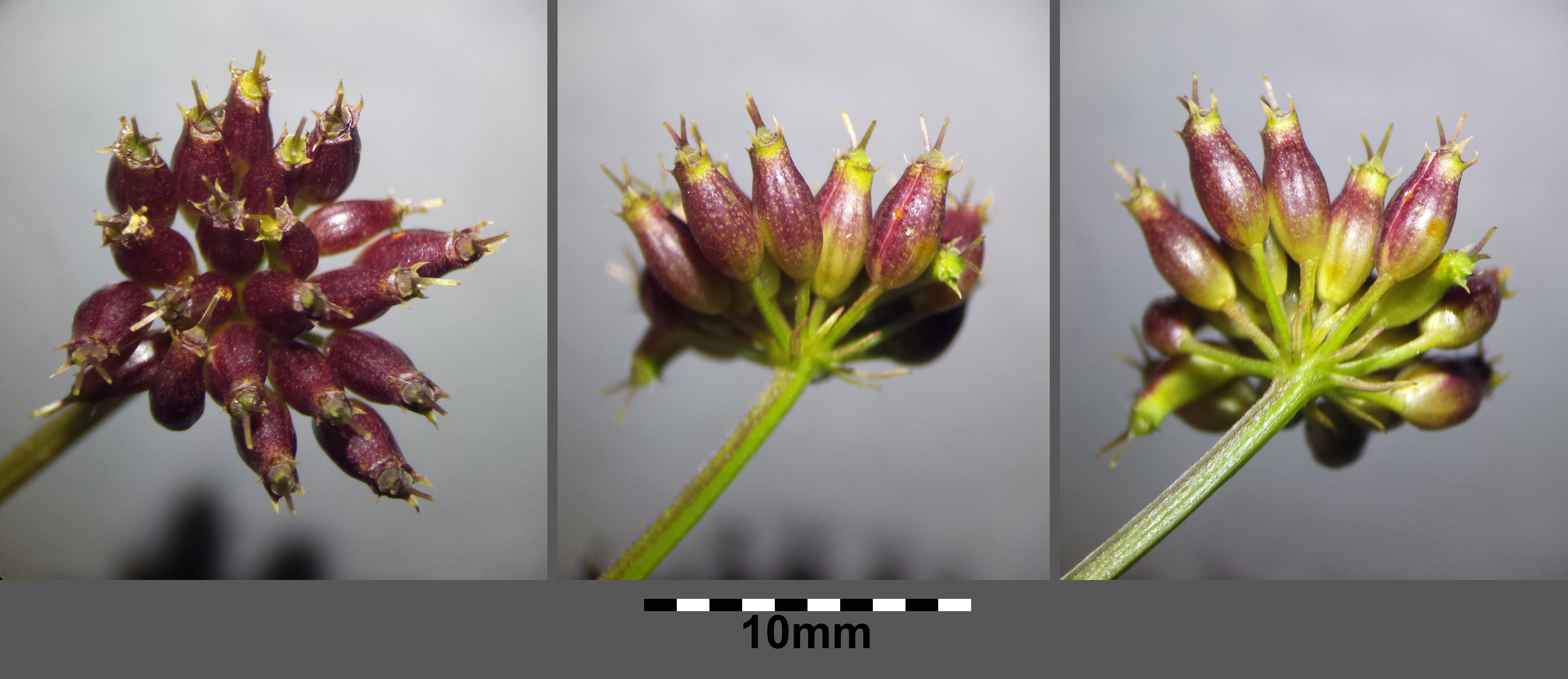
Ripening fruits

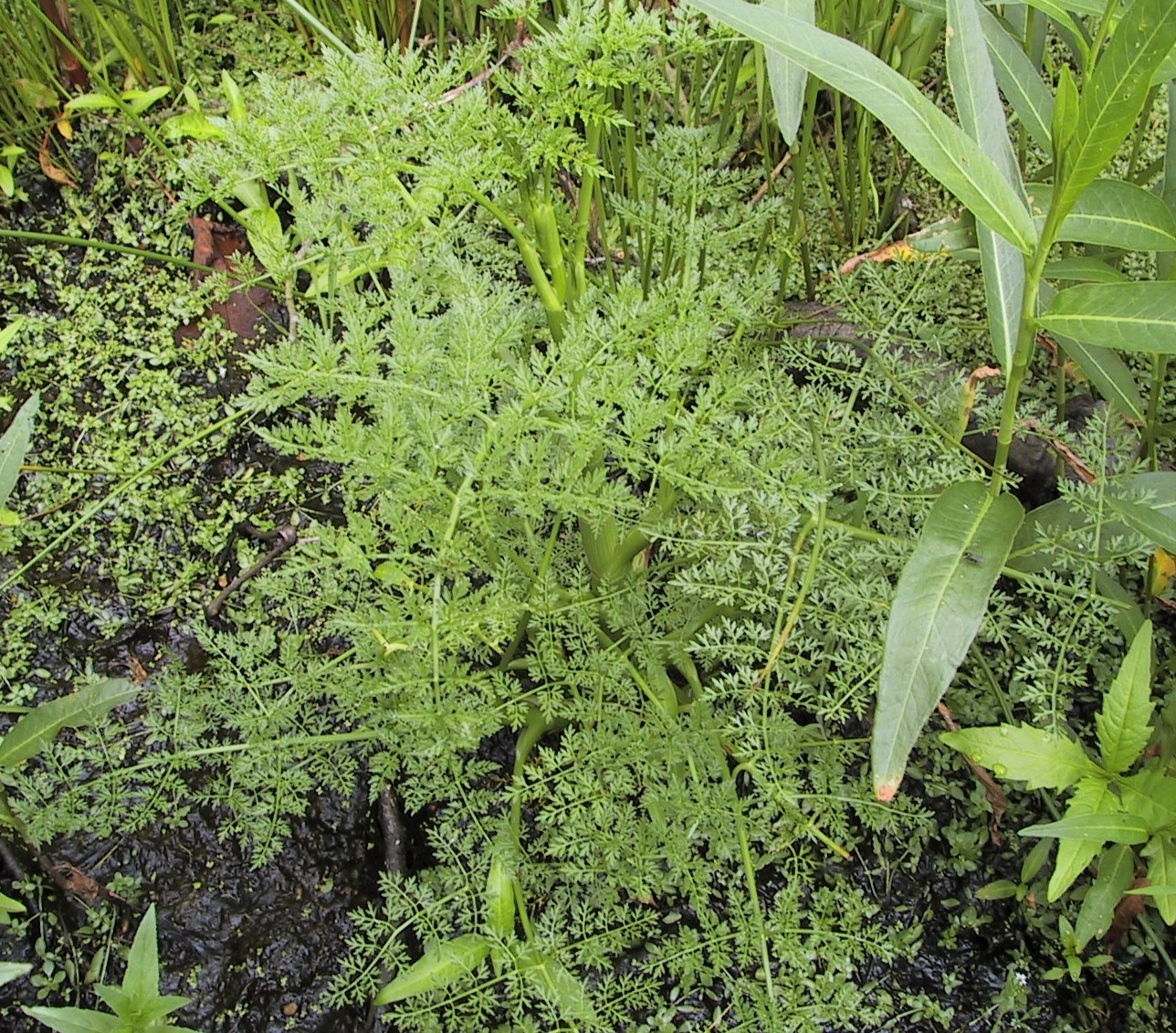
The foliage is characteristically finely divided.

When compared to other water-dropworts in Britain, fine-leaved water-dropwort does have particularly finely divided leaves, up to 4-pinnate, with small, lobed leaflets. The plant it is most likely to be confused with is river water-dropwort, which for a long time was thought to be the same species. Under water, they are not at all alike (river water-dropwort grows fully submerged in running water, with diamond-shaped leaflets), but the emergent plants are very similar. The best way to separate them is by the fruits, which are ovoid and no more than 4.5 mm long in aquatica vs. cylindrical and greater than 5 mm long in fluviatilis.

== Distribution and status ==
The native range is from Ireland in the west, eastwards to central Siberia and from the more southerly parts of Scandinavia southwards to the Mediterranean basin. It is rarely found as an introduction outside this area, but there are records of it in Washington, D.C., and New Zealand, where it is not considered to be invasive. Although it was present in a few places in Spain, it is thought to be extinct there now.

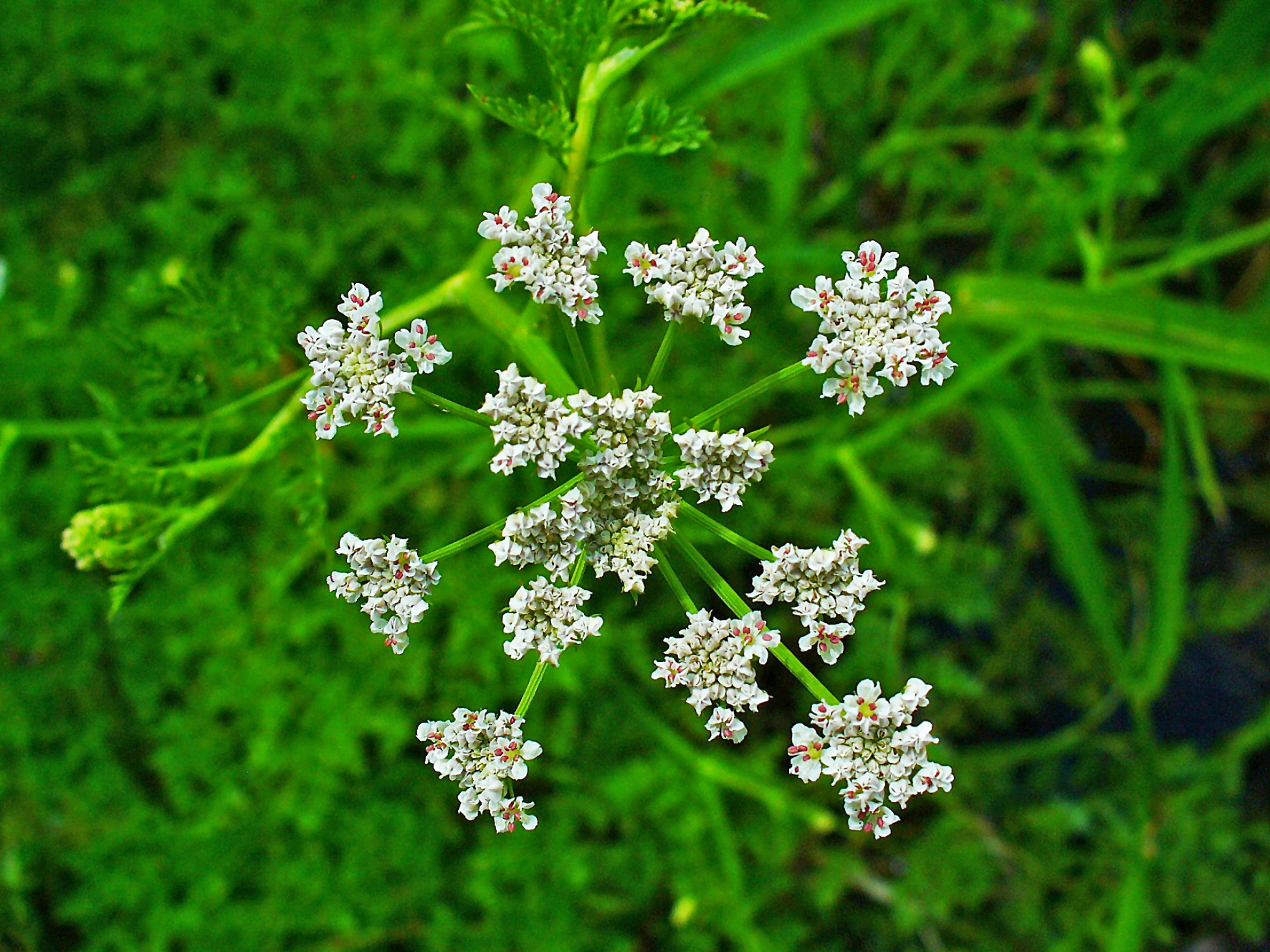
Close-up of the flowers in Karlsruhe, Germany

Globally, its status is LC (Least Concern), and populations of Oenanthe aquatica are recorded as 'stable' by the IUCN.

In Britain, it is found mainly in the lowlands of eastern England, from Kent to Yorkshire and western England, from Somerset to Lancashire. It is rare in Wales, and absent from Scotland. In Ireland it is widely distributed throughout lowland areas. It has declined slightly in abundance in Britain over the last 50 years or so, but it is still given the status of LC. In many counties it is listed as an axiophyte, showing that it is considered a plant of significance for conservation.

It is widespread and common in France and overall has a status of Least Concern, although in Corsica it is considered to be VU (Vulnerable) and in two départements (Midi-Pyrénées and Provence-Alpes-Côte d’Azur) it is classified as EN (Endangered).

In Germany, where it is known as Großer Wasserfenchel (Great Water Fennel), it is considered an indicator of natural floodplain vegetation, and attempts to restore ecosystem function on the Danube have used this species as a measure of success.

In the former Czechoslovakia, fine-leaved water-dropwort is very common and occurs predominantly in shallow reservoirs, oxbows and temporary pools up to 640 m above sea level in the Brdy hills. It can be very abundant, reaching pest status, in pools with a fluctuating water level, in the year following the drainage event.

== Habitat and ecology ==
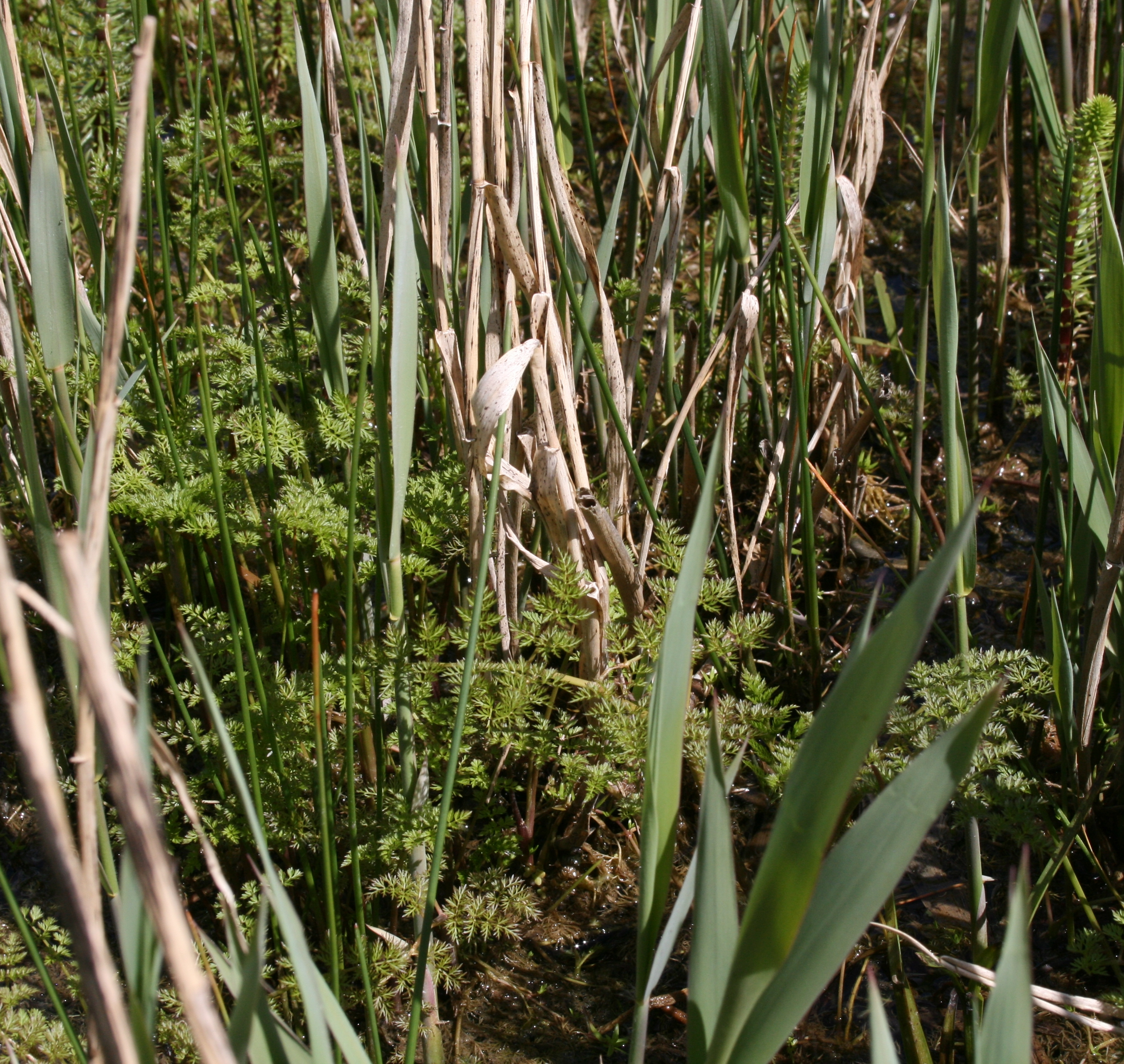
Plants of fine-leaved water-dropwort flourishing in a recently harvested Phragmites reedbed.

Fine-leaved water-dropwort is strictly a wetland plant, occurring in a wide variety of habitats which vary from full sun to medium shade, fresh to slightly brackish water, and from low to fairly high nutrient status. Its Ellenberg values in Britain are L = 7, F = 10, R = 7, N = 6, and S = 0.

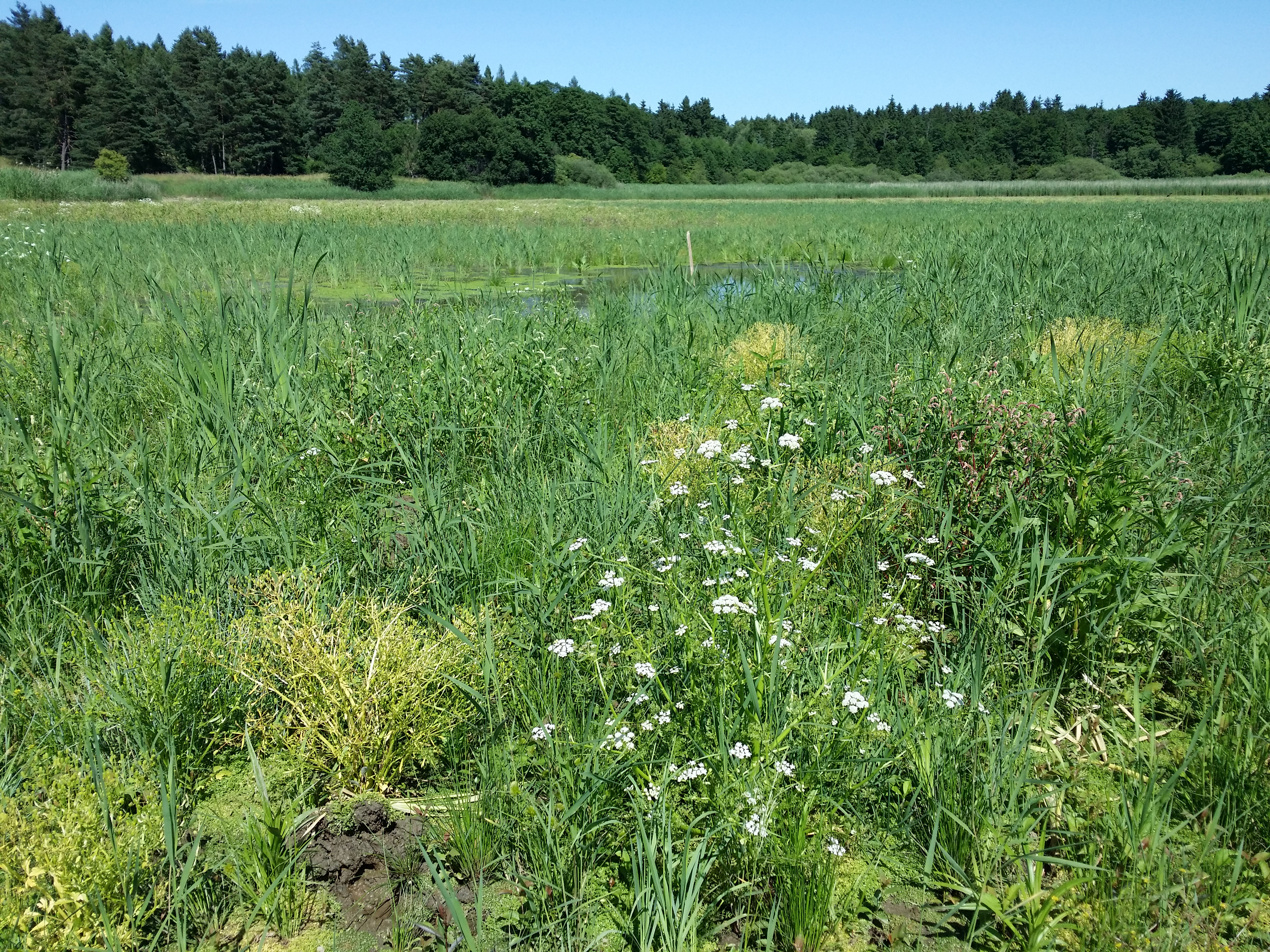
Typical habitat in a fluctuating pool, as here at Zieringser Teich in Austria

Its main habitat throughout its range is reed swamp (European C5.1a "tall helophyte beds"), where it is generally scarce but sometimes appears in abundance when the reeds are cut or disturbed. It is generally more abundant, however, in pools with a fluctuating water level, where it can germinate and rapidly grow on bare mud in the summer. Other habitats for it include ditches, canals, streams, rivers, wet woodland, and degraded mires. Its National Vegetation Classification communities include W1 grey willow, W5 alder and W6 crack willow woodlands; OV30 drawdown zone vegetation; S4 common reed, S12 reedmace and S28 reed canary-grass reedbeds; and S27 marsh cinquefoil bog. Sometimes it occurs on silty, mineral soils in places such as farmland ponds, but more often it is found on fenland peat.

It is a lowland plant, in Britain being found up to about 200 m in Shropshire. In Europe it occurs at higher altitudes (Zieringser Teich, pictured here, is at 520 m).

Like all umbellifers, fine-leaved water-dropwort has unspecialised flowers which are pollinated by a variety of insects.

There are eight species listed on the Database of Insects and their Food Plants as feeding on fine-leaved water-dropwort in Britain. Three (Prasocuris phellandrii, Hypera adspersa and H. arundinis) are beetles, two (Lixus iridis and L. paraplecticus) weevils, one (Lasioptera carophila) a midge, and two (Depressaria daucella and D. ultimella) are micro-moths. They create galls in the stem, leaves or flowers, or the larvae browse on the foliage or flowers. None of them feeds exclusively on fine-leaved water-dropwort.

== Uses ==
Because of the danger of poisoning, fine-leaved water-dropwort is not widely used. The fruits are reputed to cause vertigo, drunkenness and narcotic symptoms, and it can easily be confused with other, more deadly species such as hemlock water-dropwort. Nevertheless, it is reported by ethnobotanists as being used to treat various medical conditions, such as chronic pectoral diseases, dyspepsia, fevers and ulcers.
