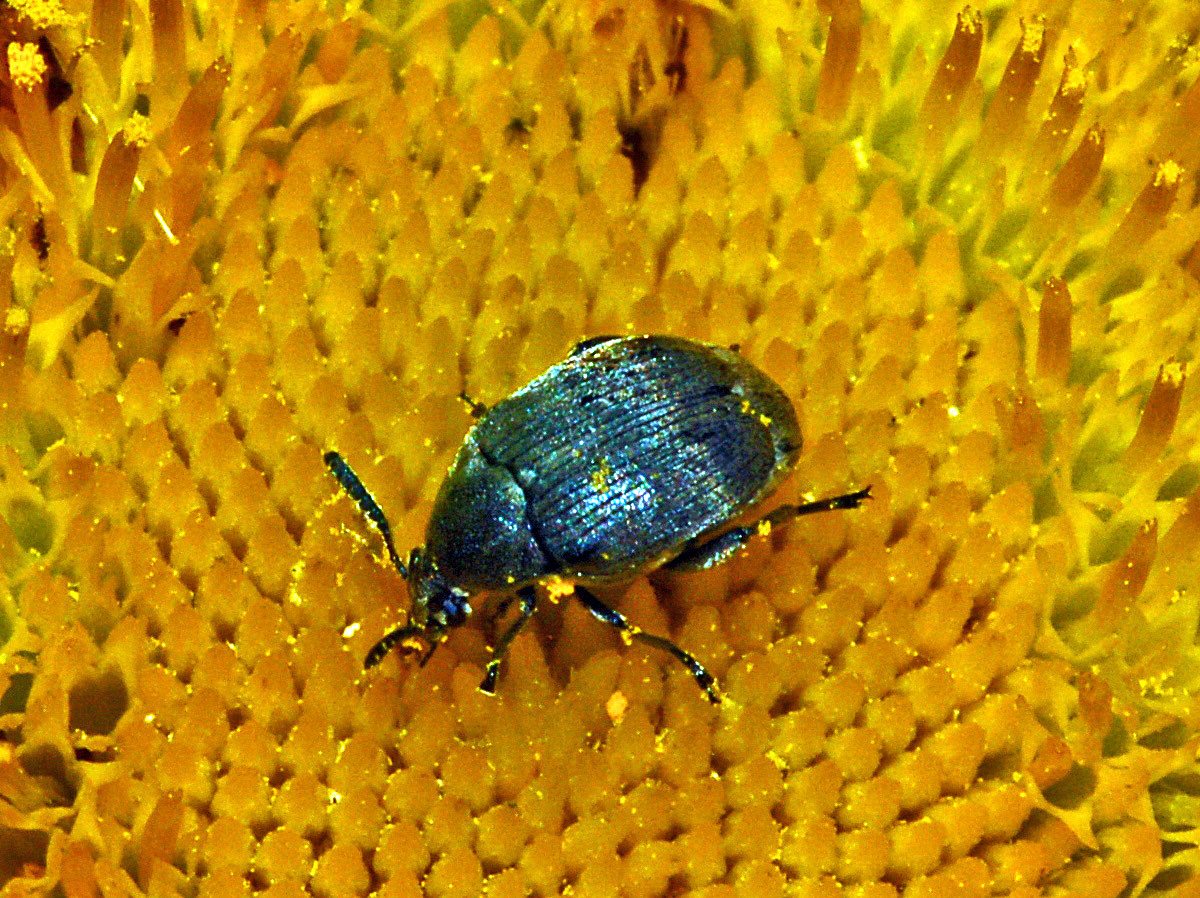
- Spermophagus species

Scientific classification
- Kingdom: Animalia
- Phylum: Arthropoda
- Clade: Pancrustacea
- Class: Insecta
- Order: Coleoptera
- Suborder: Polyphaga
- Infraorder: Cucujiformia
- Family: Chrysomelidae
- Subfamily: Bruchinae
- Tribe: Amblycerini
- Genus: Spermophagus; Schoenherr, 1833

Synonyms
- Euspermophagus Zacher, 1930

= Spermophagus =

Genus of beetles

Spermophagus sp.

Spermophagus is a genus of beetles belonging to the family Chrysomelidae subfamily Bruchinae.

== Species ==
- Spermophagus abdominalis (Fabricius, 1781)
- Spermophagus aeneipennis Pic, 1917
- Spermophagus albomaculatus Decelle, 1970
- Spermophagus albosparsus Gyllenhal, 1833
- Spermophagus albosuturalis Pic, 1933
- Spermophagus albovittatus Anton, 2000
- Spermophagus altaicus Karapetjan 1973
- Spermophagus babaulti Pic, 1921
- Spermophagus bengalicus Borowiec, 1991
- Spermophagus bifidus Anton, 2000
- Spermophagus bimaculatus Pic, 1911
- Spermophagus brincki Decelle, 1970
- Spermophagus calystegiae (Lukyanovich & Ter-Minasyan, 1957)
- Spermophagus canus Baudi, 1886
- Spermophagus caricus Decelle, 1982
- Spermophagus caucasicus Baudi, 1886
- Spermophagus cederholmi Decelle, 1975
- Spermophagus ceylonicus Pic, 1917
- Spermophagus cicatricosus Gyllenhal, 1833
- Spermophagus ciliatipes Pic, 1927
- Spermophagus coimbatorensis Borowiec, 1991
- Spermophagus complectus Sharp, 1866
- Spermophagus confusus Borowiec, 1986
- Spermophagus cornutus Delobel, 2008
- Spermophagus coronatus Borowiec, 1991
- Spermophagus decellei Borowiec, 1985
- Spermophagus divergens Fahraeus, 1871
- Spermophagus dongdokiensis Borowiec, 1991
- Spermophagus drak Borowiec, 1991
- Spermophagus eichleri Borowiec, 1986
- Spermophagus endrodii Borowiec, 1986
- Spermophagus excavatus Pic, 1917
- Spermophagus heydeni Allard, 1868
- Spermophagus hottentotus Fahraeus, 1839
- Spermophagus humilis Decelle, 1970
- Spermophagus incertus Borowiec, 1991
- Spermophagus inlineolatus Pic, 1931
- Spermophagus insularis Delobel, 2008
- Spermophagus johnsoni Borowiec, 1985
- Spermophagus kannegieterei Pic, 1911
- Spermophagus kingsolveri Borowiec, 1986
- Spermophagus klapperichi Borowiec, 1985
- Spermophagus kochi Decelle, 1975
- Spermophagus kuesteri Schilsky, 1905
- Spermophagus kuskai Borowiec, 1986
- Spermophagus latithorax Boheman, 1829
- Spermophagus ligatus Chevrolat, 1877
- Spermophagus lindbergorum Decelle, 1975
- Spermophagus longepygus Anton, 1993
- Spermophagus maafensis Borowiec, 1985
- Spermophagus maai Borowiec, 1991
- Spermophagus madecassus Pic, 1917
- Spermophagus malvacearum Decelle, 1971
- Spermophagus mannarensis Decelle, 1986
- Spermophagus marmoreus Borowiec, 1991
- Spermophagus maurus Fahraeus, 1871
- Spermophagus maynei Pic, 1924
- Spermophagus minutissiumus Borowiec, 1991
- Spermophagus minutus Borowiec, 1991
- Spermophagus moerens Boheman, 1839
- Spermophagus monardi Decelle, 1975
- Spermophagus multifloccosus Borowiec, 1991
- Spermophagus multiguttatus Pic, 1917
- Spermophagus multipunctatus Pic, 1917
- Spermophagus murtulai Pic, 1924
- Spermophagus negligens Pic, 1917
- Spermophagus newtoni Borowiec, 1986
- Spermophagus niger Motschulsky, 1866
- Spermophagus okahandjensis Decelle, 1973
- Spermophagus palmi Borowiec, 1991
- Spermophagus perpastus (Lea, 1899)
- Spermophagus pfaffenbergeri Borowiec, 1986 (Synonym of Spermophagus perpastus)
- Spermophagus pilipes Borowiec, 1991
- Spermophagus posticus Chevrolat, 1877
- †Spermophagus pluto Wickham, 1914
- Spermophagus pubiventris Baudi, 1886
- Spermophagus punjabensis Borowiec, 1991
- Spermophagus pygopubens Pic, 1930
- Spermophagus ruandanus Borowiec, 1991
- Spermophagus rufipes (Ter-Minassian, 1975)
- Spermophagus rufanotatus Pic, 1903
- Spermophagus samuelsoni Borowiec, 1991
- Spermophagus schroederi Decelle, 1973
- Spermophagus scotti Decelle, 1971
- Spermophagus semiannulatus Pic, 1918
- Spermophagus sericeus (Geoffroy, 1785)
- Spermophagus shamszadehi Delobel & Sadeghi, 2013
- Spermophagus siamensis Borowiec, 1991
- Spermophagus sinensis Pic, 1918
- Spermophagus somulicus Decelle, 1979
- Spermophagus sophorae Fahraeus, 1839
- Spermophagus stemmleri Decelle, 1977
- Spermophagus takuensis Delobel, 2011
- Spermophagus tandalensis Borowiec, 1986
- Spermophagus titivilitius Boheman, 1833
- Spermophagus transvaalensis Borowiec, 1986
- Spermophagus tristis Fahraeus, 1871
- Spermophagus truncatus Anton, 2000
- Spermophagus variolosopunctatus Gyllenhal, 1833
- Spermophagus vietnamensis Borowiec, 1991
- †Spermophagus vivificatus Scudder, 1876
- Spermophagus voarum Delobel, 2008
- Spermophagus wittmeri Borowiec, 1985
