= Spermophagus drak =

Scientific classification
- Domain: Eukaryota
- Kingdom: Animalia
- Phylum: Arthropoda
- Class: Insecta
- Order: Coleoptera
- Suborder: Polyphaga
- Infraorder: Cucujiformia
- Family: Chrysomelidae
- Genus: Spermophagus
- Species: S. drak

Binomial name
- Spermophagus drak Borowiec, 1991

Species of beetle

Spermophagus drak is a beetle species from the Chrysomelidae family. The scientific name of this species was first published in 1991 by Borowiec.
