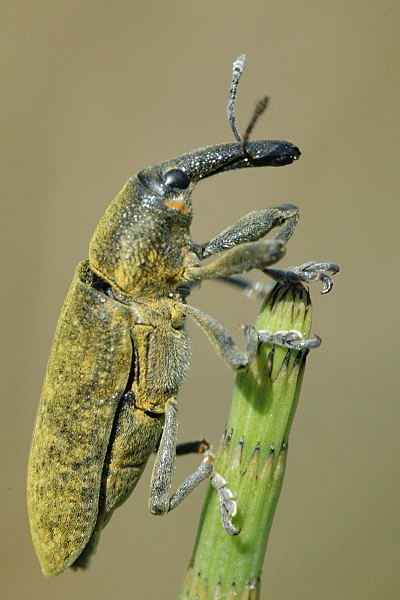
- Lixus pulverulentus

Scientific classification
- Kingdom: Animalia
- Phylum: Arthropoda
- Clade: Pancrustacea
- Class: Insecta
- Order: Coleoptera
- Suborder: Polyphaga
- Infraorder: Cucujiformia
- Superfamily: Curculionoidea
- Family: Curculionidae
- Genus: Lixus
- Species: L. pulverulentus

Binomial name
- Lixus pulverulentus (Scopoli, 1763)

Synonyms
- List: Curculio angustatus Fabricius, 1775; Lixus angustatus ( Fabricius, 1775); Lixus hungarus Petri, 1905; Lixus kolenati Hochhuth, 1847; Lixus lefebvrei Boheman, 1835; Curculio pulvereus Olivier, 1790; Lixus subangustatus Motschulsky, 1849; Lixus algirus ( Linnaeus)

= Lixus pulverulentus =

Species of beetle

Lixus pulverulentus is a species of weevil belonging to the family Curculionidae. It is commonly known as the elongated bean weevil. The species was scientifically described in 1763 by Giovanni Antonio Scopoli as Curculio pulverulentus Scopoli, 1763.

== Distribution ==
This widespread, but quite rare species can be found in southern and central Europe (including the Iberian Peninsula), from Iran to Asia Minor and in the Mediterranean Basin, including North Africa and the Middle East

Hastings Country Park produced the last British records of this species and it is now considered to no longer breed in Britain.

== Description ==
Lixus pulverulentus can reach a body length of about 10.5–17.5 mm (0.41–0.69 in). These rather long weevils have a narrow, elongated body. The conically shaped pronotum is hardly granular. They are dusted yellowish to brownish.

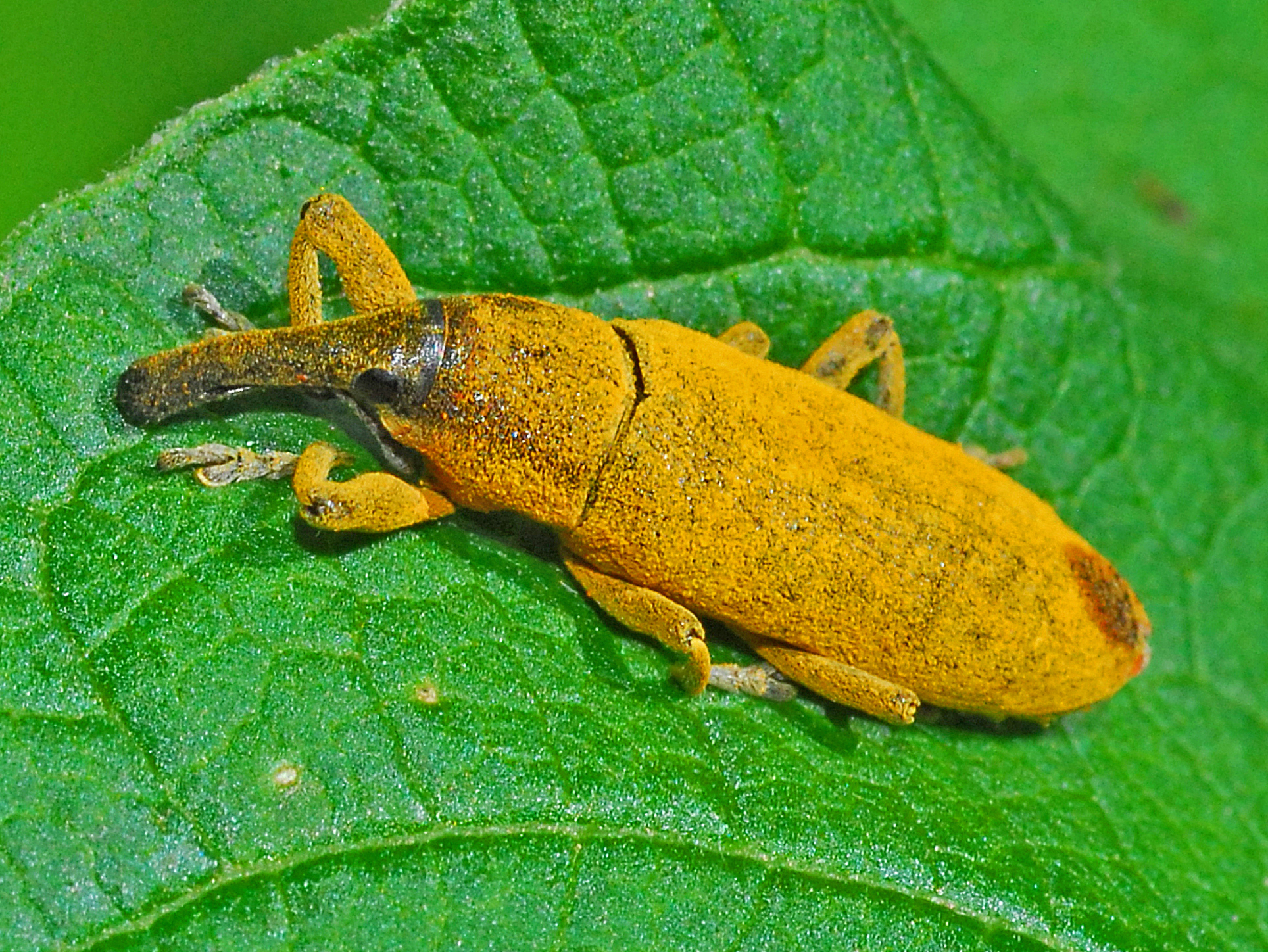

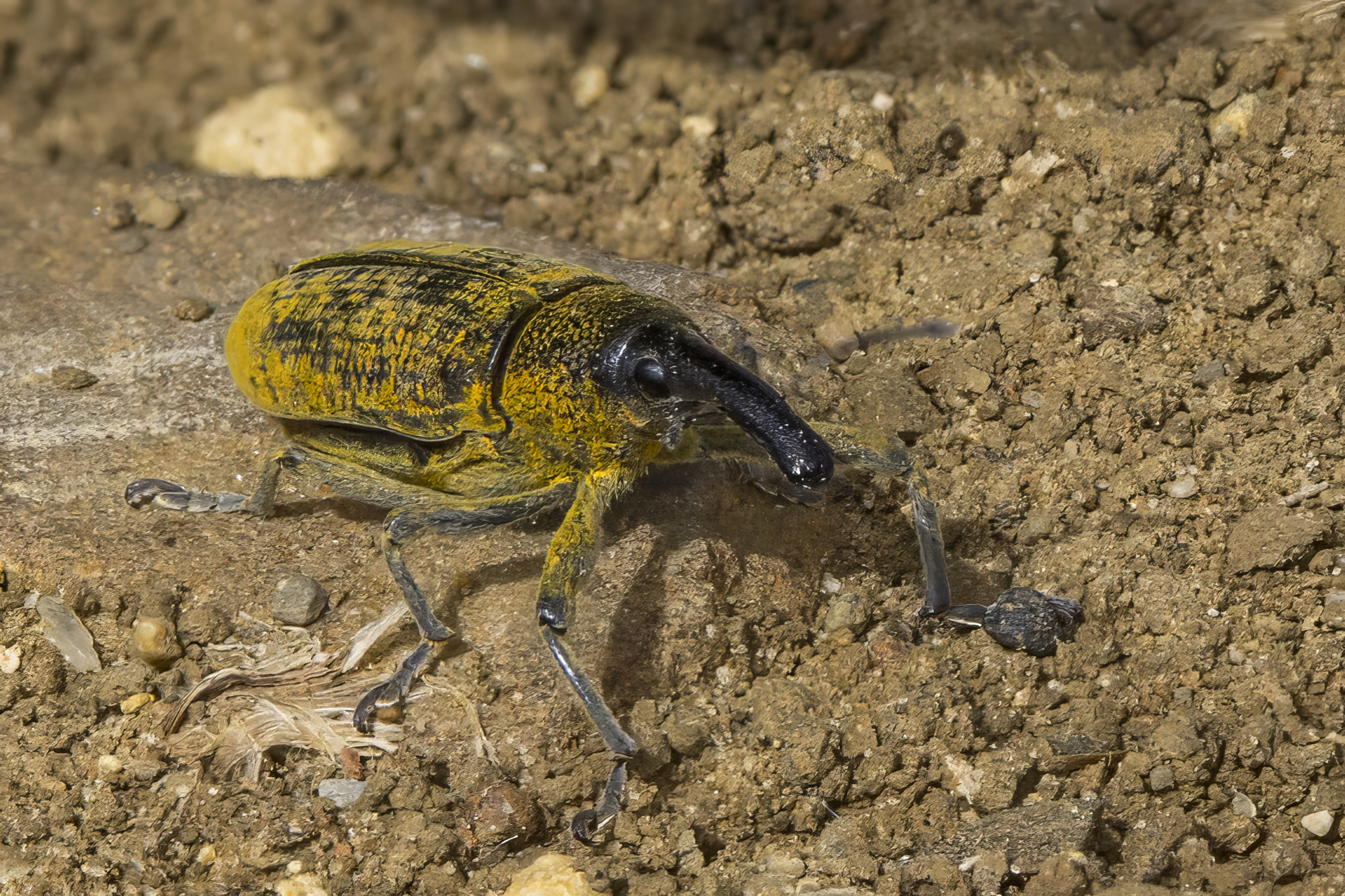

== Biology ==
The beetles appear in April. They are mainly seen in May and June. Larvae of these polyphagous beetles mainly develop in the stems of Malvaceae, Asteraceae, and Fabaceae (Alcea rosea, Malva pusilla, Malva sylvestris. Malva thuringiaca.Cirsium arvense, Cirsium palustre, Cirsium serrulatum, Carduus acanthoides, Silybum marianum, Centaurea nigra, Onopordum acanthium, Vicia faba, etc.) Pupation also takes place in the stems. The beetles hibernate in the dried stems or in the soil.
