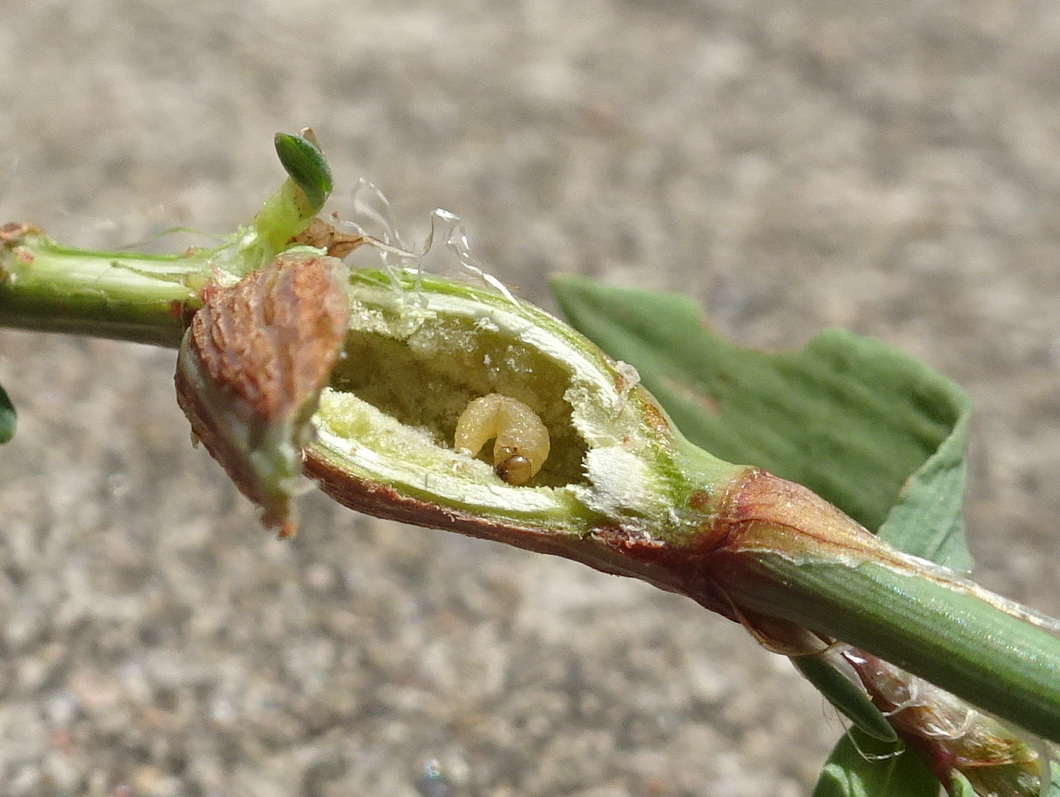
- Larva in stem gall

Scientific classification
- Kingdom: Animalia
- Phylum: Arthropoda
- Clade: Pancrustacea
- Class: Insecta
- Order: Coleoptera
- Suborder: Polyphaga
- Infraorder: Cucujiformia
- Superfamily: Curculionoidea
- Family: Curculionidae
- Genus: Lixus
- Species: L. musculus

Binomial name
- Lixus musculus Say, 1831

= Lixus musculus =

Species of beetle

Lixus musculus is a species of true weevil in the beetle family Curculionidae. It is found in North America.
