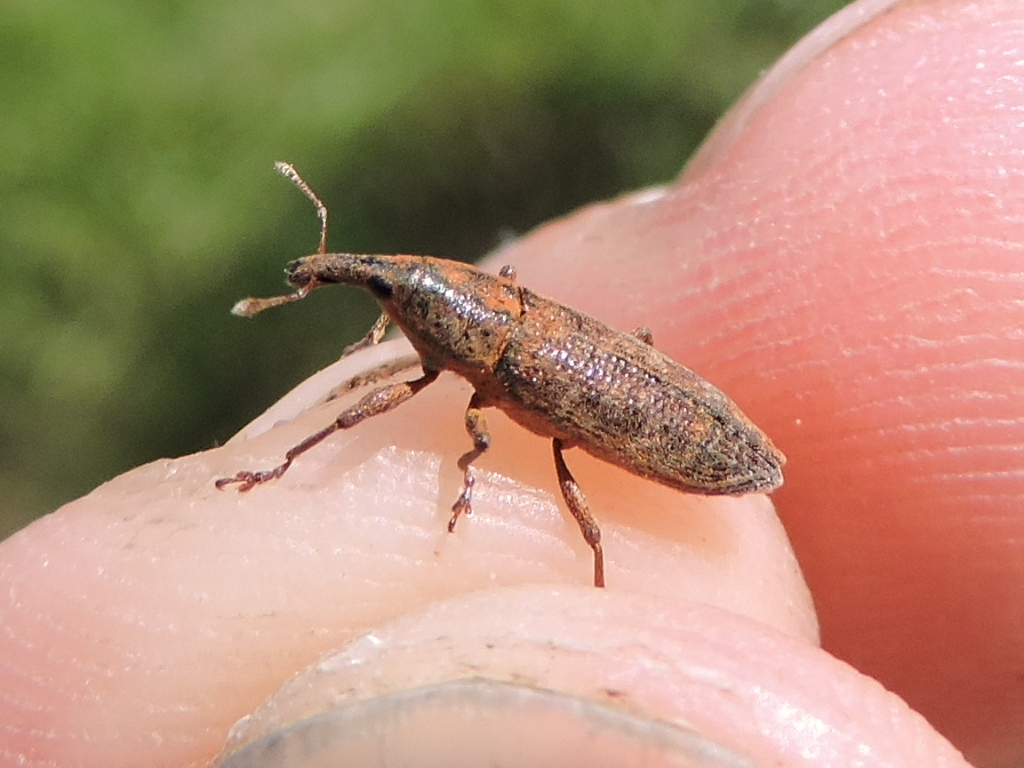

Scientific classification
- Kingdom: Animalia
- Phylum: Arthropoda
- Clade: Pancrustacea
- Class: Insecta
- Order: Coleoptera
- Suborder: Polyphaga
- Infraorder: Cucujiformia
- Superfamily: Curculionoidea
- Family: Curculionidae
- Genus: Lixus
- Species: L. merula

Binomial name
- Lixus merula Suffrian, 1871

Synonyms
- Lixus sexualis Casey, 1891

= Lixus merula =

Species of beetle

Lixus merula is a species of true weevil in the beetle family Curculionidae. It is found in North America.
