= Lixus nitidulus =

Scientific classification
- Kingdom: Animalia
- Phylum: Arthropoda
- Clade: Pancrustacea
- Class: Insecta
- Order: Coleoptera
- Suborder: Polyphaga
- Infraorder: Cucujiformia
- Superfamily: Curculionoidea
- Family: Curculionidae
- Genus: Lixus
- Species: L. nitidulus

Binomial name
- Lixus nitidulus Casey, 1891

Synonyms
- Lixus deceptus Blatchley, 1916; Lixus tricristatus Chittenden, 1930

Species of beetle

Lixus nitidulus is a species of true weevil in the beetle family Curculionidae. It is found in North America.
