= Margarita Ervandovna Ter-Minassian =

Russian entomologist

- Маргарита Ервандовна Тер-Минасян
- Born: 16 May 1910; Leipzig, Germany
- Died: 9 April 1995 (aged 84)
- Education: Yerevan State University
- Spouse: Andrey Andreevich Richter
- Children: Vera Andreevna Richter
- Scientific career
- Fields: Entomology: Weevils (Curculionoidea) and seed beetles (Bruchinae)
- Workplaces: USSR Academy of Sciences (Zoological Institute, 1935-1938), Armenian Academy of Sciences (Zoological Institute, 1938-1950), USSR Academy of Sciences (Zoological Institute, 1950-retirement)

Margarita Ervandovna Ter-Minassian (Russian: Маргарита Ервандовна Тер-Минасян; 16 May 1910 – 9 April 1995) was a Soviet entomologist and specialist for weevils (Curculionoidea) and seed beetles (Bruchinae). Her name is sometimes transliterated as Ter-Minasian or Ter-Minasyan.

== Biography ==
Ter-Minassian was born in the German city of Leipzig, while her father was staying there for education. She got her secondary education in Echiadzin, and was a student at Yerevan State University from 1926. After graduating, she continued her education in 1932 at the Zoological Institute of the USSR Academy of Sciences in Leningrad, where she defended a candidate's dissertation in 1935.

In the 1930s, she married entomologist Andrey Andreevich Richter, with whom she had a daughter, Vera Andreevna Richter (Вера Андреевна Рихтер), who also became an entomologist.

After working in Leningrad as a senior researcher, she moved back to Yerevan when the Armenian National Academy of Sciences was founded in 19493 and she was nominated director of its Zoological Institute. During this time, she also taught courses at Yerevan State University and was granted full professorship in 1943.

After 1950, she worked again at the USSR Academy of Sciences in Leningrad, where she continued her research even after her retirement.

During her career, she was specializing on seed beetles (Chrysomelidae: Bruchinae) and weevils (Coleoptera: Curculionoidea). She had a special interest in the weevil subfamily Lixinae, on which she published two important monographs. Altogether, she published more than 170 scientific works, mostly about taxonomy, zoogeography and evolution. She described at least 150 new species.

She was described as a "sociable and outgoing person" who also loved Armenian classical poetry.

== Selected bibliography ==
- Ter-Minassian, M. E. (1967): Zhuki-dolgonosiki podsemejstva Cleoninae fauny SSSR. Tsvetozhily i stebleedy (triba Lixini). Nauka, Leningrad, 140 + 1 p. (English translation published as: Weevils of the Subfamily Cleoninae in the Fauna of the USSR. Tribe Lixini. USDA Agricultural Research Service, Washington, D. C. by Amerind Publishing Co. Pvt. Ltd., New Delhi, 1978. 166 pp.).
- Ter-Minasian M. E. (1988): Zhuki-dolgonosiki podsemeystva Cleoninae fauny SSSR: Kornevye dolgonosiki (triba Cleonini). Nauka, Leningrad, 235 p. (English translation of the title: Weevils of the Subfamily Cleoninae in the Fauna of the USSR. Tribe Cleonini.)
