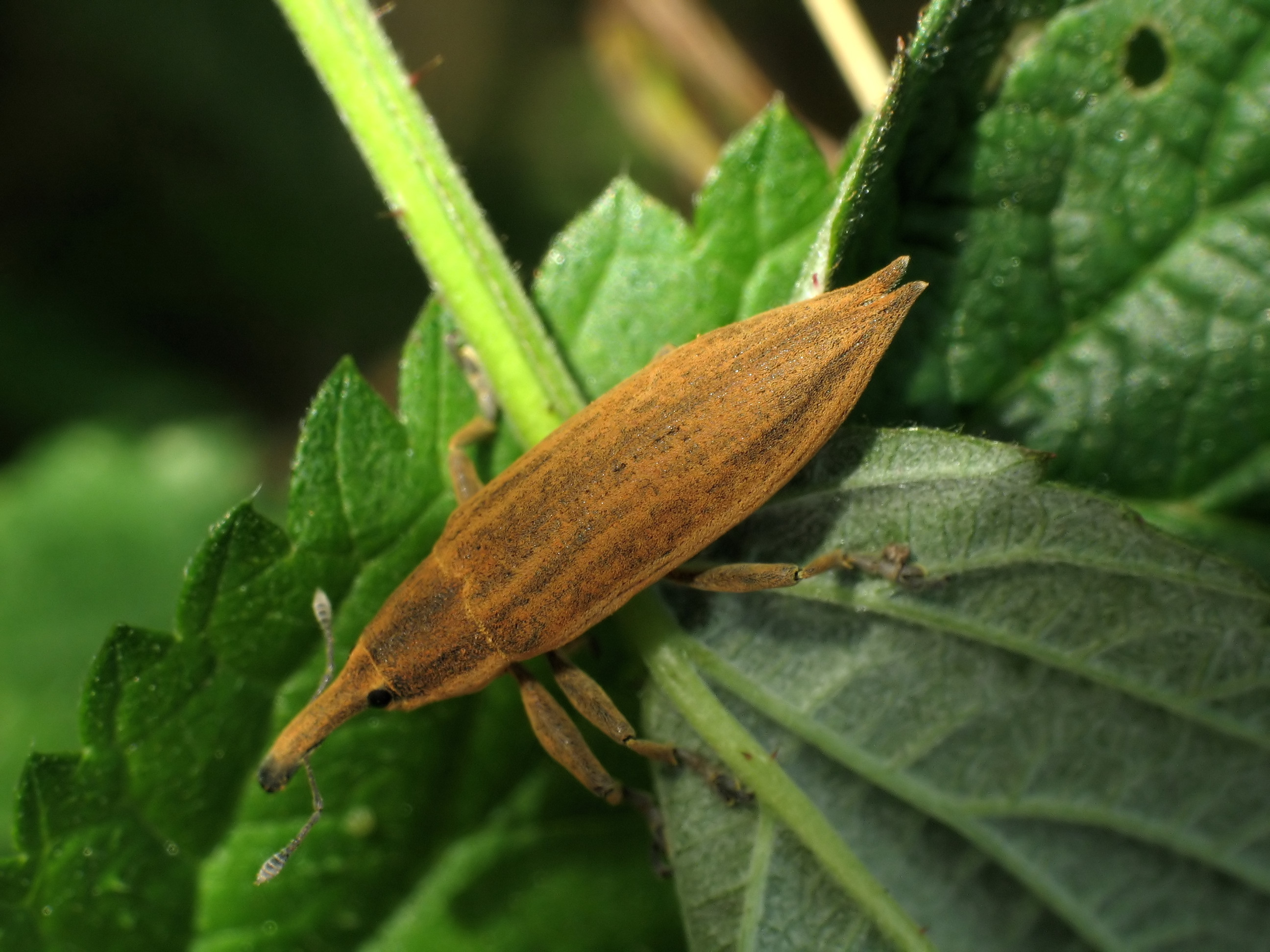

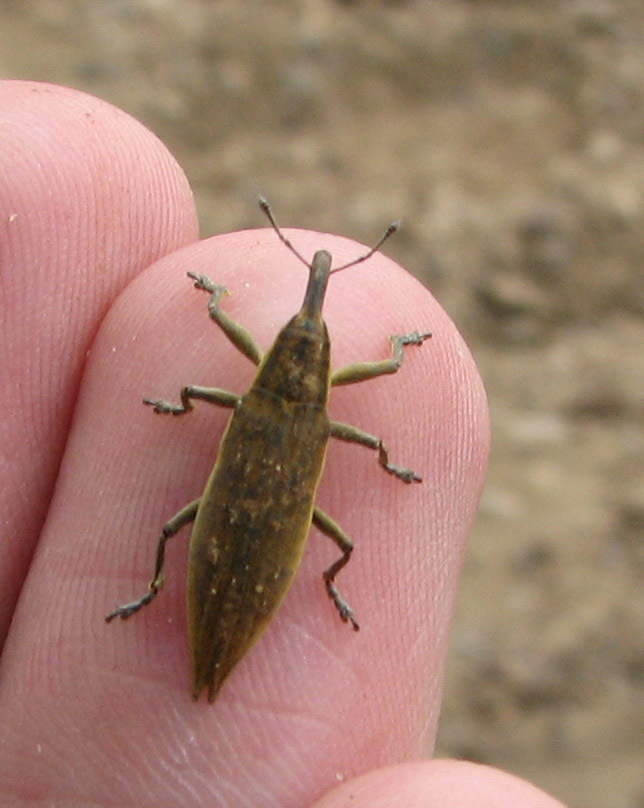

Scientific classification
- Kingdom: Animalia
- Phylum: Arthropoda
- Clade: Pancrustacea
- Class: Insecta
- Order: Coleoptera
- Suborder: Polyphaga
- Infraorder: Cucujiformia
- Superfamily: Curculionoidea
- Family: Curculionidae
- Genus: Lixus
- Species: L. iridis

Binomial name
- Lixus iridis Olivier, 1807

= Lixus iridis =

Species of beetle

Lixus iridis is a species of weevil found in Europe.

== Description ==
The adults grow up to 12–17 mm long. The body is oblong and features a yellow-grey coloration. There are three faint longitudinal grey grooves on the prothorax and the abdomen. Elbowed (characteristic of true weevils) and thin antennae are placed on the upper third of the straight and cylindrical rostrum which is as long as the prothorax. Finally, they have thin legs with little thickened femurs.

== Biology ==
This species lays its eggs in June.

== Etymology ==
The name iridis, which literally means "from Iris", refers to the Iris plant.
