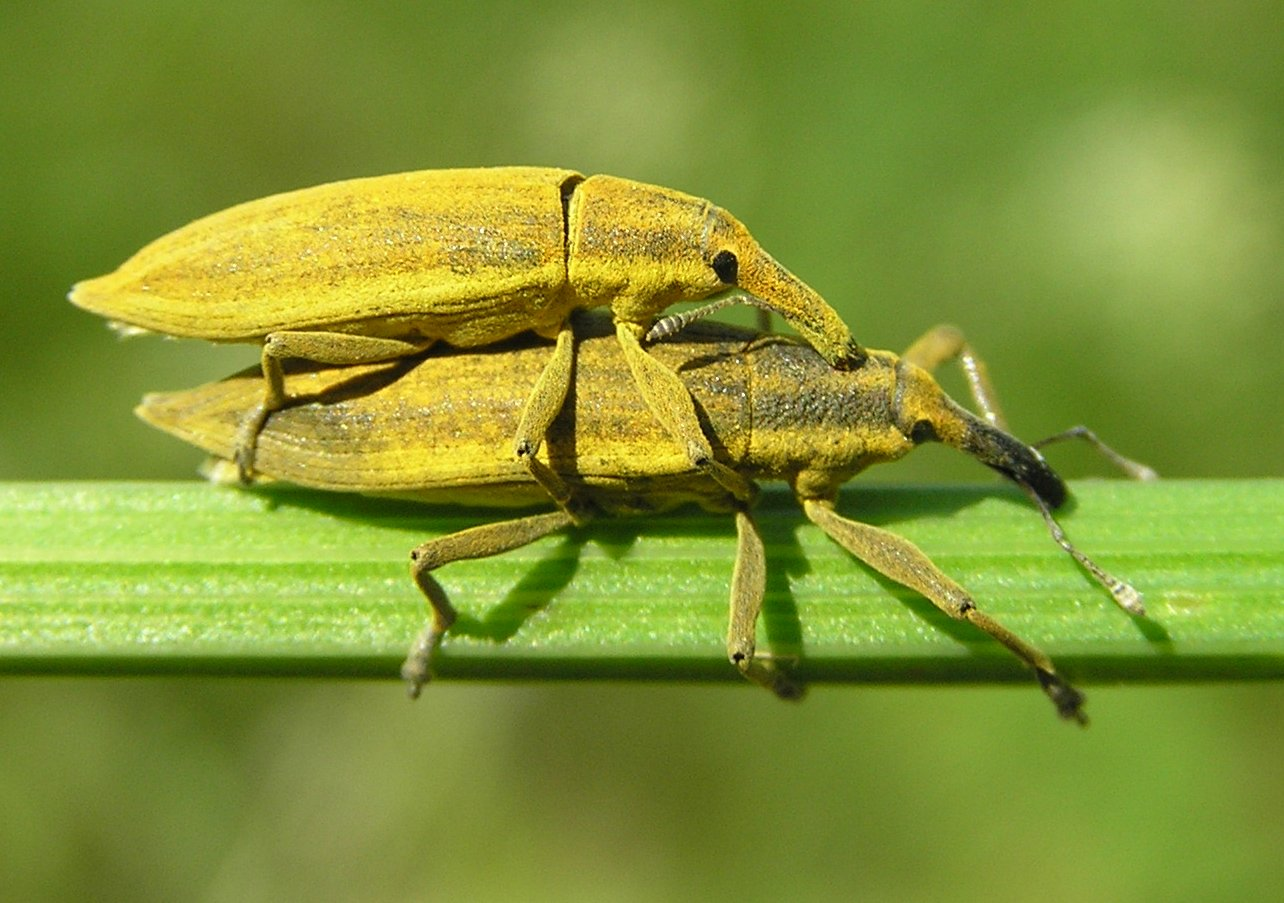

Scientific classification
- Domain: Eukaryota
- Kingdom: Animalia
- Phylum: Arthropoda
- Class: Insecta
- Order: Coleoptera
- Suborder: Polyphaga
- Infraorder: Cucujiformia
- Family: Curculionidae
- Genus: Lixus
- Species: L. paraplecticus

Binomial name
- Lixus paraplecticus (Linnaeus, 1758)

= Lixus paraplecticus =

Species of beetle

Lixus paraplecticus is a species of beetle belonging to the family Curculionidae.

It is native to Europe.
