= List of Anthonomus species =

This is a list of 749 species in Anthonomus, a genus of true weevils in the family Curculionidae.

== Anthonomus species ==
- Anthonomus abdominalis Schenkling, S. & Marshall G.A.K., 1934^{c}
- Anthonomus accola Clark, 1990^{c}
- Anthonomus acerolae Clark, 1988^{c}
- Anthonomus acus Clark, 1990^{c}
- Anthonomus adnexus Burke, 1988^{i c}
- Anthonomus aegrotus Clark in Clark & Burke, 1996^{c}
- Anthonomus aeneolus Dietz, 1891^{i c b}
- Anthonomus aeneotinctus Champion, G.C., 1903^{c}
- Anthonomus aereus Champion, G.C., 1903^{c}
- Anthonomus aeroides Clark, 1990^{c}
- Anthonomus aestuans (Fabricius, J.C., 1792)^{c g}
- Anthonomus affinis LeConte, J.L., 1896^{c}
- Anthonomus agamus Clark, 1988^{c}
- Anthonomus agerochus Clark, 1991^{c}
- Anthonomus agresi Clark, 1990^{c}
- Anthonomus aguilari Ferragu, 1964^{c}
- Anthonomus aino Kôno, 1939^{c}
- Anthonomus albitus Clark in Clark & Burke, 1996^{c}
- Anthonomus alboannulatus Boheman, 1843^{c}
- Anthonomus albocapitis Clark, 1991^{c}
- Anthonomus albocivitensis Clark, 1993^{c}
- Anthonomus albolineatus Champion, G.C., 1903^{c}
- Anthonomus albomaculatus Kôno, 1939^{c}
- Anthonomus albopictus Champion, G.C., 1903^{c}
- Anthonomus albopilosus Dietz, 1891^{i c b}
- Anthonomus albopunctatus Voss, 1941^{c}
- Anthonomus alboscutellatus Champion, 1903^{i c}
- Anthonomus albus Hatch, 1971^{i g}
- Anthonomus alni Kojima & Morimoto, 1994^{c}
- Anthonomus altamnis Clark, 1988^{c}
- Anthonomus alternans Champion, G.C., 1903^{c}
- Anthonomus amaguensis Cockerell, T.D.A., 1925^{c g}
- Anthonomus amari Clark, 1990^{c}
- Anthonomus ambiguus Clark, 1990^{c}
- Anthonomus amygdali Hustache, 1930^{c}
- Anthonomus ancepitis Clark, 1990^{c}
- Anthonomus anenius Clark, 1991^{c}
- Anthonomus annulipes Fischer, 1888^{c}
- Anthonomus anomalops Clark, 1989^{c}
- Anthonomus anthracinus Boheman, 1843^{c}
- Anthonomus antirrhini Billberg, 1820^{c}
- Anthonomus apertus Fall, 1901^{i c}
- Anthonomus aphanostephi Pierce, W.D., 1908^{c}
- Anthonomus apionoides Clark, 1990^{c}
- Anthonomus appositus Fall, 1913^{i c b}
- Anthonomus aptus Clark & Burke, 1985^{c}
- Anthonomus araucanus Clark, 1989^{c}
- Anthonomus arenicolor ^{c b}
- Anthonomus argentatus Gyllenhal, 1835^{c}
- Anthonomus argentinensis Hustache, 1939^{c}
- Anthonomus argocephale Clark, 1991^{c}
- Anthonomus aristus Suffrian, E., 1871^{c}
- Anthonomus armicrus Fairmaire, L., 1897^{c}
- Anthonomus arrogans Clark, 1991^{c}
- Anthonomus ater LeConte, 1876^{i c b}
- Anthonomus aterrimus Champion, G.C., 1903^{c}
- Anthonomus atomarius Blatchley, 1916^{i c}
- Anthonomus auctoratis Clark, 1992^{c}
- Anthonomus australis Boisduval, 1835^{c}
- Anthonomus avarus Germar, 1817^{c}
- Anthonomus avidus Faust, J., 1893^{c}
- Anthonomus azalus Clark, 1990^{c}
- Anthonomus babai Morimoto & Kojima, 1994^{c}
- Anthonomus baccharidis Pierce, W.D., 1908^{c}
- Anthonomus bajaensis Clark & Burke, 2005^{c}
- Anthonomus bardus Clark in Clark & Burke, 1996^{c}
- Anthonomus baridioides Champion, G.C., 1903^{c}
- Anthonomus basalis Kirsch, T., 1874^{c}
- Anthonomus basidens Fall, 1913^{c}
- Anthonomus baudueri Desbrochers, J., 1875^{c}
- Anthonomus bavarus Schenkling, S. & Marshall G.A.K., 1934^{c}
- Anthonomus beccus Clark & Burke, 1985^{c}
- Anthonomus bechynei Voss, 1956^{c}
- Anthonomus bechyneorum Clark, 1987^{c}
- Anthonomus behnei Kostal, 2014^{c g}
- Anthonomus bellus Clark, 1990^{c}
- Anthonomus belti Clark, 1988^{c}
- Anthonomus berberidis Clark, 1989^{c}
- Anthonomus bicorostris Blatchley, 1925^{i c}
- Anthonomus bidentatus Boheman, 1843^{c}
- Anthonomus bifasciatus Matsumura,^{c}
- Anthonomus bifidus Burke, 1962^{c}
- Anthonomus bimaculatus Hustache, 1930^{c}
- Anthonomus biplagiatus Redtenbacher, L., 1868^{c}
- Anthonomus bisignatus Gyllenhal, 1835^{c}
- Anthonomus bisignifer Schenkling, S. & Marshall G.A.K., 1934^{c}
- Anthonomus bisinuatus Burke & Cross, 1966^{c}
- Anthonomus bituberculatus Thomson, C.G., 1868^{c}
- Anthonomus blanchardi Clark, 1989^{c}
- Anthonomus blatchleyi Schenkling, S. & Marshall G.A.K., 1934^{c}
- Anthonomus blik Clark, 1994^{c}
- Anthonomus bohemani Clark & Burke, 1985^{c}
- Anthonomus bolteri Dietz, 1891^{i c}
- Anthonomus bondari Clark, 1992^{c}
- Anthonomus bonvouloiri Desbrochers, J., 1868^{c}
- Anthonomus bordoni Clark, 1987^{c}
- Anthonomus brachyrhinus Anderson, 1994^{c}
- Anthonomus brasiliensis Clark, 1992^{c}
- Anthonomus brenthus Clark, 1991^{c}
- Anthonomus brevipennis Clark, 1993^{c}
- Anthonomus brevirostris Linell, M.L., 1897^{c}
- Anthonomus brevispinus Pic, M., 1902^{c}
- Anthonomus britannus Desbrochers, J., 1868^{c}
- Anthonomus bruchi Hustache, 1939^{c}
- Anthonomus brunneipennis Curtis, J., 1840^{c}
- Anthonomus brunnipennis Mannerheim, 1843^{i c}
- Anthonomus cacerensis Clark, 1988^{c}
- Anthonomus cacuminis Clark, 1993^{c}
- Anthonomus caeruleus Champion, G.C., 1903^{c}
- Anthonomus caerulisquamis Champion, G.C., 1903^{c}
- Anthonomus caesius Clark, 1990^{c}
- Anthonomus calceatus Say, 1831^{c}
- Anthonomus californiensis Clark & Burke, 2005^{c}
- Anthonomus callirrhoe Pierce, W.D., 1908^{c}
- Anthonomus callosus Faust, J., 1893^{c}
- Anthonomus calvescens Schenkling, S., 1934^{c}
- Anthonomus camerunensis Schenkling, S. & Marshall G.A.K., 1934^{c}
- Anthonomus camoiranensis Clark, 1987^{c}
- Anthonomus campinas Marshall, 1938^{c}
- Anthonomus canaliculatus Schenkling, S., 1934^{c}
- Anthonomus canescens Champion, G.C., 1903^{c}
- Anthonomus canoides Clark & Burke, 2001^{c}
- Anthonomus canus LeConte, J.L., 1876^{c}
- Anthonomus capensis Boheman, 1843^{c}
- Anthonomus captivus Clark, 1988^{c}
- Anthonomus caracasius Faust, J., 1893^{c}
- Anthonomus carbonarius Dejean,^{c}
- Anthonomus carnifex Clark, 1993^{c}
- Anthonomus catocha Clark in Clark & Burke, 1996^{c}
- Anthonomus cavei Clark in Clark & Burke, 1993^{c}
- Anthonomus challtonii Clark, 1990^{c}
- Anthonomus championi Clark & Burke, 1985^{c}
- Anthonomus chaos Clark, 1991^{c}
- Anthonomus chernatris Clark, 1988^{c}
- Anthonomus chevrolati Desbrochers, J., 1868^{c}
- Anthonomus chilensis Schenkling, S. & Marshall G.A.K., 1934^{c}
- Anthonomus chilicola Clark, 1989^{c}
- Anthonomus chinculticensis Clark, 1987^{c}
- Anthonomus ciccus Clark, 1993^{c}
- Anthonomus ciliaticollis Champion, 1910^{c}
- Anthonomus cinctus Thomson, C.G., 1865^{c}
- Anthonomus cinereus Schenkling, S. & Marshall G.A.K., 1934^{c}
- Anthonomus clavatus Dejean, 1821^{c}
- Anthonomus coactus Clark, 1992^{c}
- Anthonomus cognatus Burke, 1964^{i c}
- Anthonomus collinus Billberg, 1820^{c}
- Anthonomus comari Crotch, G.R., 1869^{c}
- Anthonomus comatosus Clark in Clark & Burke, 1996^{c}
- Anthonomus commutatus Dieckmann, 1975^{c}
- Anthonomus comparabilis Clark, 1990^{c}
- Anthonomus concinnus Dietz, 1891^{i c}
- Anthonomus concubius Clark in Clark & Burke, 1996^{c}
- Anthonomus confusus Dietz, 1891^{i c}
- Anthonomus connexus Dieckmann, 1968^{c}
- Anthonomus consimilis Dietz, 1891^{i c}
- Anthonomus consors (Dietz, 1891)^{i b} (cherry curculio)
- Anthonomus conspersus Desbrochers, J., 1868^{c}
- Anthonomus constrictus Hustache, 1939^{c}
- Anthonomus contaminatus Boheman, 1843^{c}
- Anthonomus convexicollis Gyllenhal, 1835^{c}
- Anthonomus convexifrons Hustache, 1930^{c}
- Anthonomus convexipennis Clark, 1993^{c}
- Anthonomus convictus Gates, 1972^{i c b}
- Anthonomus corvulus LeConte, 1876^{i c b}
- Anthonomus cossonoides Schenkling, S. & Marshall G.A.K., 1934^{c}
- Anthonomus costipennis Fairmaire, L., 1889^{c}
- Anthonomus costulatus Suffrian, 1871^{i c}
- Anthonomus coyamensis Clark, 1988^{c}
- Anthonomus crataegi Walsh, 1866^{c}
- Anthonomus crenatus Champion, G.C., 1903^{c}
- Anthonomus cretaceus Clark, 1990^{c}
- Anthonomus cribratellus Reitter, 1915^{c}
- Anthonomus cristatus Schenkling, S. & Marshall G.A.K., 1934^{c}
- Anthonomus curtulus Desbrochers, J., 1892^{c}
- Anthonomus curtus Faust, J., 1882^{c}
- Anthonomus curvicrus Clark, 1990^{c}
- Anthonomus curvirostris Schenkling, S. & Marshall G.A.K., 1934^{c}
- Anthonomus cuyaguensis Clark, 1988^{c}
- Anthonomus cyaneus Champion, G.C., 1903^{c}
- Anthonomus cyanicolor Gyllenhal, 1835^{c}
- Anthonomus cyanipennis Champion, G.C., 1903^{c}
- Anthonomus cycliferus Fall, 1913^{i c}
- Anthonomus cylindricollis Blatchley, 1916^{i c}
- Anthonomus cymatilis Clark, 1990^{c}
- Anthonomus cyprius Marshall, 1925^{c}
- Anthonomus czekanowskii Ter-Minasian, 1936^{c}
- Anthonomus dealbatus Champion, 1910^{c}
- Anthonomus debilis Blatchley, 1916^{i c}
- Anthonomus deceptus Sleeper, 1955^{i c}
- Anthonomus decipiens LeConte, 1876^{i c b}
- Anthonomus defossus Scudder, S.H., 1876^{c g}
- Anthonomus deliqulus Clark & Burke, 1985^{c}
- Anthonomus dentatus Dejean, 1821^{c}
- Anthonomus denticrus Clark, 1994^{c}
- Anthonomus denticulatus Clark, 1989^{c}
- Anthonomus dentipennis Chevrolat, L.A.A., 1876^{c}
- Anthonomus dentipes Hustache, 1940^{c}
- Anthonomus dentoni Angell, 1893^{i c b}
- Anthonomus desbrochersi Faust, J., 1890^{c}
- Anthonomus deserticolus Clark & Burke, 2005^{c}
- Anthonomus diamantinaensis Clark, 1987^{c}
- Anthonomus dicionis Clark, 1992^{c}
- Anthonomus differens Hustache, 1930^{c}
- Anthonomus dilutus Reitter, 1915^{c}
- Anthonomus discoidalis Tournier, H., 1873^{c}
- Anthonomus disjunctus LeConte, 1876^{i c b}
- Anthonomus dissimilis Dietz, 1891^{c}
- Anthonomus distigma Champion, G.C., 1903^{c}
- Anthonomus distinguendus Desbrochers, J., 1868^{c}
- Anthonomus divisus Suffrian, E., 1871^{c}
- Anthonomus dogma Clark, 1994^{c}
- Anthonomus dormitor Clark in Clark & Burke, 1996^{c}
- Anthonomus dorothyae Hatch, 1971^{i g}
- Anthonomus dorsalis Sturm, 1826^{c}
- Anthonomus druparum Billberg, 1820^{c}
- Anthonomus dufaui Hustache, 1930^{c}
- Anthonomus duplus Clark, 1990^{c}
- Anthonomus duprezi Hoffmann, 1955^{c}
- Anthonomus ebenicus Dietz, 1891^{c}
- Anthonomus effetus Dietz, 1891^{i c}
- Anthonomus elatus Clark in Clark & Burke, 1996^{c}
- Anthonomus elegans Sturm, 1826^{c}
- Anthonomus elongatulus Boheman, 1843^{c}
- Anthonomus elongatus LeConte, 1876^{i c b}
- Anthonomus elutus
- Anthonomus erythropterus Say, 1831^{c}
- Anthonomus esse Clark, 1993^{c}
- Anthonomus estebani Clark & Burke, 1986^{c}
- Anthonomus eugenii Cano, 1894^{i c b} (pepper weevil)
- Anthonomus excelsus Clark & Burke, 1985^{c}
- Anthonomus excultus Clark & Burke, 1985^{c}
- Anthonomus exiguum Clark, 1993^{c}
- Anthonomus existo Clark, 1993^{c}
- Anthonomus extensus ^{c b}
- Anthonomus faber Dietz, 1891^{i c b}
- Anthonomus faillae Desbrochers, J., 1892^{c}
- Anthonomus fasciatus Stephens, 1829^{c}
- Anthonomus fastosus Clark, 1991^{c}
- Anthonomus faustinoi Clark & Burke, 1986^{c}
- Anthonomus felipae Clark & Burke, 1986^{c}
- Anthonomus femoratus Desbrochers, J., 1868^{c}
- Anthonomus ferrugineus Sturm, 1826^{c}
- Anthonomus figuratus Dietz, 1891^{c}
- Anthonomus filicornis Hustache, 1930^{c}
- Anthonomus filirostris Champion, 1910^{c}
- Anthonomus finitimus Burke, 1988^{i c}
- Anthonomus fischeri Blackwelder, 1947^{c}
- Anthonomus fissicaudus Clark, 1990^{c}
- Anthonomus flavescens Boheman, 1843^{c}
- Anthonomus flavicornis Boheman, 1843^{c}
- Anthonomus flavidomus Clark, 1989^{c}
- Anthonomus flavus Boheman, 1843^{i c}
- Anthonomus flexuosus Hustache, 1930^{c}
- Anthonomus floralis Dietz, 1891^{i c}
- Anthonomus foliicola Ter-Minasian, 1954^{c}
- Anthonomus formosus Kirsch, T., 1868^{c}
- Anthonomus fortunatus Clark, 1988^{c}
- Anthonomus fragariae Schenkling, S. & Marshall G.A.K., 1934^{c}
- Anthonomus fraudulentus Voss^{g}
- Anthonomus frustratus Clark, 1987^{c}
- Anthonomus fulvipes Schenkling, S. & Marshall G.A.K., 1934^{c}
- Anthonomus fulvus LeConte, 1858^{i c b} (winecup weevil)
- Anthonomus funereus Champion, G.C., 1903^{c}
- Anthonomus furcatus Schenkling, S. & Marshall G.A.K., 1934^{c}
- Anthonomus fuscipennis Clark, 1993^{c}
- Anthonomus fuscomaculatus Schenkling, S. & Marshall G.A.K., 1934^{c}
- Anthonomus fusicolor Voss, 1944^{c}
- Anthonomus gallinae Clark & Burke, 1986^{c}
- Anthonomus galphimiae Clark, 1987^{c}
- Anthonomus gaurus Clark, 1991^{c}
- Anthonomus geminus Clark, 1990^{c}
- Anthonomus gentilis Faust, J., 1891^{c}
- Anthonomus germanicus Dieckmann, 1968^{c}
- Anthonomus gerra Clark, 1993^{c}
- Anthonomus gibbicrus Clark, 1994^{c}
- Anthonomus gibbipennis Schenkling, S. & Marshall G.A.K., 1934^{c}
- Anthonomus gigas Boheman, 1843^{c}
- Anthonomus globosus Clark, 1990^{c}
- Anthonomus gracilicornis Hustache, 1940^{c}
- Anthonomus gracilipes Desbrochers, J., 1872^{c}
- Anthonomus gracilis Fall, H.C.,^{c}
- Anthonomus grandis Boheman, 1843^{i c b} (boll weevil)
- Anthonomus gravatis Clark, 1992^{c}
- Anthonomus grilati Desbrochers, J., 1885^{c}
- Anthonomus griseisquamis Schenkling, S. & Marshall G.A.K., 1934^{c}
- Anthonomus grouvellei Desbrochers, J., 1887^{c}
- Anthonomus guadelupennis Hustache, A., 1929^{c}
- Anthonomus guadelupensis Hustache, 1930^{c}
- Anthonomus guanita Clark, 1990^{c}
- Anthonomus guerreroensis Anderson, 1994^{c}
- Anthonomus gularis LeConte, 1876^{i c}
- Anthonomus guttatus Clark, 1990^{c}
- Anthonomus haematopus Boheman, 1843^{i c b}
- Anthonomus haemorrhoidalis Sturm, 1826^{c}
- Anthonomus haliki Clark, 1987^{c}
- Anthonomus hamiltoni Dietz, 1891^{c}
- Anthonomus hastigerus Clark & Burke, 1985^{c}
- Anthonomus helianthi Fall, 1901^{i c b}
- Anthonomus helopioides Kolenati, F.A., 1859^{c}
- Anthonomus helvolus Boheman, 1843^{c}
- Anthonomus heterogenus Dietz, 1891^{i c b}
- Anthonomus heterothecae Pierce, 1908^{i c b}
- Anthonomus hicoriae Pierce, W.D., 1908^{c}
- Anthonomus hirsutus Bruner, 1888^{c}
- Anthonomus hirtus LeConte, 1876^{i c}
- Anthonomus homunculus Gyllenhal, 1835^{c}
- Anthonomus howdenorum Clark, 1987^{c}
- Anthonomus humeralis Porta, 1932^{c}
- Anthonomus humerosus Schenkling, S. & Marshall G.A.K., 1934^{c}
- Anthonomus humerulus Kojima & Idris, 2004^{c}
- Anthonomus hunteri Burke & Cate, 1979^{c}
- Anthonomus hustachi Clark, 1991^{c}
- Anthonomus iactationis Clark, 1991^{c}
- Anthonomus idea Clark, 1994^{c}
- Anthonomus imbifidus Clark, 1988^{c}
- Anthonomus imbricus Hatch, 1971^{i g}
- Anthonomus immolator Clark, 1993^{c}
- Anthonomus imperium Clark, 1992^{c}
- Anthonomus inaequalis Schenkling, S. & Marshall G.A.K., 1934^{c}
- Anthonomus inanimis Clark in Clark & Burke, 1996^{c}
- Anthonomus incanus Champion, G.C., 1934^{c}
- Anthonomus incomptus Clark, 1993^{c}
- Anthonomus inconcinnus Clark in Clark & Burke, 1996^{c}
- Anthonomus incurvus Stephens, 1831^{c}
- Anthonomus indolis Clark in Clark & Burke, 1996^{c}
- Anthonomus inermis Boheman, 1859^{i c b}
- Anthonomus inertis Clark in Clark & Burke, 1996^{c}
- Anthonomus infirmus Gyllenhal, 1835^{c}
- Anthonomus infletus Clark & Burke, 1985^{c}
- Anthonomus inobseptus Clark, 1988^{c}
- Anthonomus inornatus Daniel, K., 1899^{c}
- Anthonomus insolitus Fairmaire^{g}
- Anthonomus instabilis Faust, J., 1893^{c}
- Anthonomus interfector Clark, 1993^{c}
- Anthonomus intermedius Clark & Burke, 2005^{c}
- Anthonomus interpositus Voss, 1953^{c}
- Anthonomus interruptus Pic, 1941^{c}
- Anthonomus interstitialis Dietz, 1891^{i c}
- Anthonomus inversus Bedel, L., 1884^{c}
- Anthonomus ironia Clark in Clark & Burke, 1993^{c}
- Anthonomus irroratus Dietz, 1891^{i c}
- Anthonomus isthmicus Schenkling, S. & Marshall G.A.K., 1934^{c}
- Anthonomus izafa Clark, 1990^{c}
- Anthonomus jacobianus Dietz, 1891^{i g}
- Anthonomus jacobinus Dietz, 1891^{c b}
- Anthonomus javeti Desbrochers, J., 1868^{c}
- Anthonomus julichi Dietz, 1891^{i c}
- Anthonomus juncturus Fall, 1913^{c}
- Anthonomus juniperi Chevrolat, 1860^{c}
- Anthonomus juniperinus (Sanborn, 1868)^{i c b}
- Anthonomus kirschi Desbrochers, J., 1868^{c}
- Anthonomus klapperichi Voss, 1960^{c}
- Anthonomus koenigi Pic, 1913^{c}
- Anthonomus krugi Fischer, 1888^{c}
- Anthonomus kuscheli Clark, 1989^{c}
- Anthonomus languidus Gyllenhal, 1835^{c}
- Anthonomus laoensis Kojima, 2010^{c}
- Anthonomus latior Pic, M., 1902^{c}
- Anthonomus latiusculus Dietz, 1891^{c}
- Anthonomus latus Clark & Burke, 2005^{c}
- Anthonomus lecontei Burke, 1975^{i c b}
- Anthonomus leptopus Gozis, M des, 1881^{c}
- Anthonomus lethierryi Desbrochers, J., 1869^{c}
- Anthonomus leticiensis Clark, 1988^{c}
- Anthonomus leucocephale Clark, 1991^{c}
- Anthonomus leucostictus Dietz, 1891^{i c b}
- Anthonomus leviathan Clark, 1991^{c}
- Anthonomus lewinsohni Clark, 1992^{c}
- Anthonomus libertinus Faust, J., 1893^{c}
- Anthonomus ligatus Dietz, 1891^{i c b}
- Anthonomus ligulicollis Clark, 1993^{c}
- Anthonomus likensis Blatchley, 1916^{i c}
- Anthonomus limitaris Clark, 1988^{c}
- Anthonomus lineatulus Dietz, 1891^{c}
- Anthonomus lituratus Clark, 1990^{c}
- Anthonomus lomonga Clark, 1990^{c}
- Anthonomus longirostris Hustache, 1936^{c}
- Anthonomus longulus Boheman, 1843^{c}
- Anthonomus longurius Clark, 1993^{c}
- Anthonomus lugubris Clark, 1993^{c}
- Anthonomus luteus Suffrian, E., 1871^{c}
- Anthonomus macarioi Clark & Burke, 1986^{c}
- Anthonomus macromalus Gyllenhal, 1835^{c}
- Anthonomus maculatus Ter-Minasian, 1972^{c}
- Anthonomus major Brown, 1966^{c}
- Anthonomus mali Kojima & Morimoto, 1994^{c}
- Anthonomus malkini Hatch, 1971^{i g}
- Anthonomus mallyi Jones & Burke, 1997^{c}
- Anthonomus malpighiae Clark and Burke, 1985^{i c}
- Anthonomus maltanza Clark, 1988^{c}
- Anthonomus malvae Schenkling, S. & Marshall G.A.K., 1934^{c}
- Anthonomus managuensis Champion, 1910^{c}
- Anthonomus mandapussae Voss, 1941^{c}
- Anthonomus mankinsi Clark, 1988^{c}
- Anthonomus marialionzae Clark, 1990^{c}
- Anthonomus marmoratus Schenkling, S. & Marshall G.A.K., 1934^{c}
- Anthonomus medico Clark in Clark & Burke, 1996^{c}
- Anthonomus melancholicus Dietz, 1891^{i g}
- Anthonomus melanocephalus Germar, 1817^{c}
- Anthonomus melanocholicus Dietz, 1891^{c}
- Anthonomus melanopterus Schenkling, S. & Marshall G.A.K., 1934^{c}
- Anthonomus melanostictus Schenkling, S. & Marshall G.A.K., 1934^{c}
- Anthonomus melitoni Clark & Burke, 1986^{c}
- Anthonomus menor Clark, 1990^{c}
- Anthonomus meon Clark, 1991^{c}
- Anthonomus messanensis Vitale, 1903^{c}
- Anthonomus mexicanus Boheman, 1843^{c}
- Anthonomus miaephonus Pierce, 1912^{i c}
- Anthonomus mica Clark, 1993^{c}
- Anthonomus mimicanus Fall, 1913^{c}
- Anthonomus minor Kojima & Morimoto, 1994^{c}
- Anthonomus minutus Hatch, 1971^{i g}
- Anthonomus mirus Kirsch, T., 1868^{c}
- Anthonomus mixtus LeConte, J.L., 1876^{c}
- Anthonomus miyakawai Kojima & Morimoto, 1994^{c}
- Anthonomus modicellus Gyllenhal, 1835^{c}
- Anthonomus moleculus Casey, T.L., 1884^{c}
- Anthonomus molochinus Dietz, 1891^{i c b}
- Anthonomus mongolicus Ter-Minasian, 1972^{c}
- Anthonomus monostigma Schenkling, S. & Marshall G.A.K., 1934^{c}
- Anthonomus morbillosus Suffrian, E., 1871^{c}
- Anthonomus morbosus Clark in Clark & Burke, 1996^{c}
- Anthonomus morosus Faust, J., 1891^{c}
- Anthonomus morpheus Clark in Clark & Burke, 1996^{c}
- Anthonomus morticinus Clark
- Anthonomus morulus LeConte, 1876^{i c}
- Anthonomus multifasciatus Pic, 1926^{c}
- Anthonomus murinofasciatus Voss, 1944^{c}
- Anthonomus murinus Dietz, 1891^{c}
- Anthonomus musculus Say, 1831^{i c b} (cranberry weevil)
- Anthonomus nanus Gyllenhal, 1835^{c}
- Anthonomus naucrum Clark, 1993^{c}
- Anthonomus nebulosus LeConte, 1876^{i c b}
- Anthonomus necrosus Clark in Clark & Burke, 1996^{c}
- Anthonomus neosolani O'Brien & Wibmer, 1982^{c}
- Anthonomus nigrinus Boheman, 1843^{i c b} (potato bud weevil)
- Anthonomus nigrocapitatus Schenkling, S. & Marshall G.A.K., 1934^{c}
- Anthonomus nigromaculatus Schenkling, S. & Marshall G.A.K., 1934^{c}
- Anthonomus nigropictus Champion, G.C., 1904^{c}
- Anthonomus nigrovariegatus Fischer, 1888^{c}
- Anthonomus nihilum Clark, 1991^{c}
- Anthonomus nitidirostris Desbrochers, J., 1868^{c}
- Anthonomus nodifer Schenkling, S. & Marshall G.A.K., 1934^{c}
- Anthonomus nubiloides Fall, 1928^{c}
- Anthonomus nubilosus Clark, 1990^{c}
- Anthonomus nubilus LeConte, 1876^{i c}
- Anthonomus nullus Clark, 1991^{c}
- Anthonomus obesior Desbrochers, J., 1868^{c}
- Anthonomus obesulus Fall, 1913^{i c}
- Anthonomus objectum Clark, 1993^{c}
- Anthonomus obliquatus Hustache, 1940^{c}
- Anthonomus obscurus Stephens, 1829^{c}
- Anthonomus obsoletus Billberg, 1820^{c}
- Anthonomus obtrusus Fall, 1913^{c}
- Anthonomus obtusus Clark in Clark & Burke, 1996^{c}
- Anthonomus ochreopilosus Dietz, 1891^{i c b}
- Anthonomus ocularis Schenkling, S. & Marshall G.A.K., 1934^{c}
- Anthonomus oenuatti Clark, 1990^{c}
- Anthonomus okinawanus Kojima & Morimoto, 1994^{c}
- Anthonomus onerosus Clark, 1989^{c}
- Anthonomus ontos Clark, 1993^{c}
- Anthonomus opacirostris Desbrochers, J., 1868^{c}
- Anthonomus opinionis Clark, 1994^{c}
- Anthonomus opis Clark, 1992^{c}
- Anthonomus opous Clark, 1988^{c}
- Anthonomus oraapis Clark, 1988^{c}
- Anthonomus orchestoides Dietz, 1891^{i c}
- Anthonomus orichalceus Champion, G.C., 1906^{c}
- Anthonomus ornatulus Dietz, 1891^{i c b}
- Anthonomus ornatus Reiche, L., 1860^{c g}
- Anthonomus oscitans Clark in Clark & Burke, 1996^{c}
- Anthonomus ostentationis Clark, 1991^{c}
- Anthonomus otidocephaloides Champion, G.C., 1906^{c}
- Anthonomus ourateae Clark, 1993^{c}
- Anthonomus ousia Clark, 1993^{c}
- Anthonomus padi Puton in Bourgeois, 1908^{c}
- Anthonomus paleatus Schenkling, S. & Marshall G.A.K., 1934^{c}
- Anthonomus pallidulus Gyllenhal, 1835^{c}
- Anthonomus pallidus Dejean, 1821^{c}
- Anthonomus palmeri Jones & Burke, 1997^{c}
- Anthonomus papitrae Clark, 1990^{c}
- Anthonomus paradoxus Clark, 1991^{c}
- Anthonomus parafunereus Sleeper, 1958^{c}
- Anthonomus paraguayanus Hustache, 1939^{c}
- Anthonomus partiarius Boheman, 1843^{c}
- Anthonomus parvidens Schenkling, S. & Marshall G.A.K., 1934^{c}
- Anthonomus parvulus Blatchley, 1922^{i c}
- Anthonomus parvus Clark, 1993^{c}
- Anthonomus paulum Clark, 1993^{c}
- Anthonomus pauperculus LeConte, 1876^{i c}
- Anthonomus pauxillus Schenkling, S. & Marshall G.A.K., 1934^{c}
- Anthonomus pazmani Clark, 1990^{c}
- Anthonomus pecki Anderson, 2013^{c g}
- Anthonomus pedicularius (Linnaeus, C., 1758)^{c}
- Anthonomus peninsularis Dietz, 1891^{i c b}
- Anthonomus perforator Porta, 1932^{c}
- Anthonomus peritus Clark in Clark & Burke, 1996^{c}
- Anthonomus persicae Hong, 2004^{c}
- Anthonomus pervilis Dietz, 1891^{c}
- Anthonomus philocola Dejean, 1821^{c g}
- Anthonomus phoradendrae Anderson, 1994^{c}
- Anthonomus phyllocola (Herbst, J.F.W., 1795)^{c}
- Anthonomus phymosiae Burke, 1979^{c}
- Anthonomus picipes Blatchley, 1928^{c}
- Anthonomus pictus Blatchley, 1922^{i c}
- Anthonomus pimentai Clark, 1987^{c}
- Anthonomus pinivorax Silfverberg, 1977^{c g}
- Anthonomus pitangae Marshall, 1925^{c}
- Anthonomus plaga Clark, 1988^{c}
- Anthonomus planipennis Clark, 1993^{c}
- Anthonomus pomonae Germar, E.F., 1821^{c}
- Anthonomus pomonum Stephens, 1829^{c}
- Anthonomus pomorum (Linnaeus, C., 1758)^{c g}
- Anthonomus possum Clark in Clark & Burke, 1996^{c}
- Anthonomus posthumus Suffrian, E., 1871^{c}
- Anthonomus postscutellatus Hustache, 1939^{c}
- Anthonomus potens Clark, 1992^{c}
- Anthonomus potestatis Clark, 1992^{c}
- Anthonomus praetextum Clark in Clark & Burke, 1993^{c}
- Anthonomus pravus Clark & Burke, 1985^{c}
- Anthonomus prodigiosus Clark, 1987^{c}
- Anthonomus profundus LeConte, 1876^{i c b}
- Anthonomus pruinosus Schenkling, S. & Marshall G.A.K., 1934^{c}
- Anthonomus pruni Desbrochers, J., 1868^{c}
- Anthonomus prunicida Walsh, 1863^{c}
- Anthonomus pruniphilus Chittenden, F.H., 1925^{c}
- Anthonomus pubescens Billberg, 1820^{c}
- Anthonomus pulchellus Suffrian, E., 1871^{c}
- Anthonomus pulicarius Boheman, 1843^{c}
- Anthonomus pumilae Brown, 1966^{c}
- Anthonomus pumilus Montrouzier, X., 1860^{c}
- Anthonomus pumorum (Linnaeus, 1758)^{i g}
- Anthonomus puncticeps Champion, G.C., 1903^{c}
- Anthonomus punctipennis Gyllenhal, 1835^{c}
- Anthonomus pusillus LeConte, 1876^{i c g b}
- Anthonomus pusio Gyllenhal, 1835^{c}
- Anthonomus pustulatus Faust, J., 1893^{c}
- Anthonomus pyrenaeus Desbrochers, J., 1868^{c}
- Anthonomus pyri Chevrolat, 1844^{c}
- Anthonomus quadrigibbus Say, 1831^{i c b} (apple curculio)
- Anthonomus quechpini Clark, 1988^{c}
- Anthonomus quesnelensis Sleeper, 1955^{i c}
- Anthonomus quisqueyensis Clark & Burke, 1985^{c}
- Anthonomus ratio Clark, 1994^{c}
- Anthonomus rectirostris (Linnaeus, C., 1758)^{c g}
- Anthonomus recula Clark, 1993^{c}
- Anthonomus redtenbacheri Blackwelder, 1947^{c}
- Anthonomus reichardti Clark, 1992^{c}
- Anthonomus rhamphoides Suffrian, E., 1871^{c}
- Anthonomus rhinozote Clark, 1988^{c}
- Anthonomus rileyi ^{c b}
- Anthonomus riparius Clark, 1989^{c}
- Anthonomus roberti Wencker, 1858^{c}
- Anthonomus robinsoni Blatchley & Leng, 1916^{c}
- Anthonomus robustulus LeConte, 1876^{i c b}
- Anthonomus rodriguezi Schenkling, S. & Marshall G.A.K., 1934^{c}
- Anthonomus rohweri Wickham, H.F., 1912^{c g}
- Anthonomus rosadonetoi Clark, 1987^{c}
- Anthonomus rosarum Daniel, K., 1899^{c}
- Anthonomus rosinae Gozis, M des, 1882^{c}
- Anthonomus rostrum Schenkling, S. & Marshall G.A.K., 1934^{c}
- Anthonomus rotundicollis Schenkling, S. & Marshall G.A.K., 1934^{c}
- Anthonomus rubellus Bechstein, 1835^{c}
- Anthonomus rubens Dejean, 1821^{c}
- Anthonomus ruber Perris, E., 1857^{c}
- Anthonomus rubi Billberg, 1820^{c g}
- Anthonomus rubidus LeConte, 1876^{i c b}
- Anthonomus rubiginosus Schenkling, S. & Marshall G.A.K., 1934^{c}
- Anthonomus rubricosus Boheman, C.H., 1859^{c}
- Anthonomus rubricus Schenkling and Marshall, 1934^{i c}
- Anthonomus rubripes Gyllenhal, 1835^{c}
- Anthonomus rubromaculatus Desberger in Bechstein, 1835^{c}
- Anthonomus ruffoi Clark, 1987^{c}
- Anthonomus ruficollis Champion, G.C., 1903^{c}
- Anthonomus rufipennis LeConte, 1876^{i c g b}
- Anthonomus rufipes LeConte, 1876^{i c b}
- Anthonomus rufirostris Gyllenhal, 1835^{c}
- Anthonomus rufus Gyllenhal, 1835^{c}
- Anthonomus rupus Clark, 1988^{c}
- Anthonomus rutilus (Boheman, 1843)^{i b}
- Anthonomus ryukyuensis Kojima & Morimoto, 1994^{c}
- Anthonomus sallei Burke, 1979^{c}
- Anthonomus salvini Burke, 1979^{c}
- Anthonomus sanborni ^{c b}
- Anthonomus santacruzi Hustache
- Anthonomus santarosae Clark in Clark & Burke, 1986^{c}
- Anthonomus scabricollis Schenkling, S. & Marshall G.A.K., 1934^{c}
- Anthonomus schuhi Clark & Burke, 2005^{c}
- Anthonomus schwarzi ^{c b}
- Anthonomus schönherri Desbrochers, J., 1868^{c}
- Anthonomus scutellaris Curtis, 1829^{c}
- Anthonomus scutellatus Gyllenhal, 1835^{c}
- Anthonomus seminodulosus Kojima & Idris, 2004^{c}
- Anthonomus sexguttatus Dietz, 1891^{i c}
- Anthonomus sextuberculatus Schenkling, S. & Marshall G.A.K., 1934^{c}
- Anthonomus sibiricus Desbrochers, J., 1868^{c}
- Anthonomus signatipennis Blanchard, E. in Gay, 1851^{c}
- Anthonomus signatus Say – strawberry bud weevil
- Anthonomus silentium Clark in Clark & Burke, 1996^{c}
- Anthonomus simiolus Blatchley, 1916^{i c}
- Anthonomus sine Clark, 1991^{c}
- Anthonomus singularis Burke, 1962^{c}
- Anthonomus sinicus Voss, 1958^{c}
- Anthonomus sisymbrii Hustache, 1939^{c}
- Anthonomus sisyphus Clark, 1987^{c}
- Anthonomus sobarus Clark, 1991^{c}
- Anthonomus sobrinus Faust, J., 1893^{c}
- Anthonomus solani Fall, 1913^{i c}
- Anthonomus solarii Champion, 1910^{i c b}
- Anthonomus soleatus Clark, 1993^{c}
- Anthonomus somniculosus Clark in Clark & Burke, 1996^{c}
- Anthonomus somnium Clark in Clark & Burke, 1996^{c}
- Anthonomus somnolentus Clark in Clark & Burke, 1996^{c}
- Anthonomus soporatus Clark in Clark & Burke, 1996^{c}
- Anthonomus soporis Clark in Clark & Burke, 1996^{c}
- Anthonomus soporus Scudder, S.H., 1890^{c g}
- Anthonomus sorbi Germar, E.F., 1821^{c}
- Anthonomus sparsus Boheman, C.H., 1859^{c}
- Anthonomus sphaeralciae Fall, 1913^{i c b}
- Anthonomus spilotus Redtenbacher, 1849^{c}
- Anthonomus spinipennis Hustache, 1930^{c}
- Anthonomus spinolae Boheman, 1843^{c}
- Anthonomus spinosus Kojima, 2010^{c}
- Anthonomus squamans Champion, 1903^{i c g b}
- Anthonomus squamoerectus Clark & Burke, 2005^{c}
- Anthonomus squamosus LeConte, 1876^{i c b}
- Anthonomus squamulatus Dietz, 1891^{i c}
- Anthonomus squamulosus Schenkling, S. & Marshall G.A.K., 1934^{c}
- Anthonomus staelena Clark, 1990^{c}
- Anthonomus stellatus Clark, 1993^{c}
- Anthonomus stierlini Desbrochers des Loges, J., 1869^{c}
- Anthonomus stigmaticollis Clark, 1993^{c}
- Anthonomus stigmosus Clark, 1993^{c}
- Anthonomus stockwelli Clark, 1987^{c}
- Anthonomus stolatus Fall, 1901^{i c b}
- Anthonomus strandi Stierlin, W.G., 1903^{c}
- Anthonomus strandiata Roubal, 1936^{c}
- Anthonomus strangulatus Faust, J., 1893^{c}
- Anthonomus stupor Clark in Clark & Burke, 1996^{c}
- Anthonomus stupulosus Schenkling, S. & Marshall G.A.K., 1934^{c}
- Anthonomus subchalybaeus Reitter, 1915^{c}
- Anthonomus subfasciatus LeConte, 1876^{i c b}
- Anthonomus subguttatus Dietz, 1891^{i c}
- Anthonomus sublatus Clark, 1991^{c}
- Anthonomus subparallelus Schenkling, S. & Marshall G.A.K., 1934^{c}
- Anthonomus subvittatus LeConte, 1876^{i c}
- Anthonomus sugillatus Clark, 1990^{c}
- Anthonomus sulcatus Kirsch, T., 1874^{c}
- Anthonomus sulcicollis Hustache, 1939^{c}
- Anthonomus sulcifrons LeConte, J.L., 1876^{c}
- Anthonomus sulcipygus Schenkling, S. & Marshall G.A.K., 1934^{c}
- Anthonomus summeri Hatch, 1971^{i g}
- Anthonomus sunchalensis Cockerell, T.D.A., 1925^{c g}
- Anthonomus superbus Clark, 1991^{c}
- Anthonomus suturalis LeConte, 1824^{i c b}
- Anthonomus suturatus ^{c}
- Anthonomus suturellus Gyllenhal, 1835^{c}
- Anthonomus sycophanta Walsh, 1867^{c}
- Anthonomus tacarani Clark, 1990^{c}
- Anthonomus tahoensis Fall, 1901^{i c}
- Anthonomus takahashii Kojima & Morimoto, 1994^{c}
- Anthonomus tantillus Schenkling, S. & Marshall G.A.K., 1934^{c}
- Anthonomus tarquinius Clark, 1991^{c}
- Anthonomus teapensis Schenkling, S. & Marshall G.A.K., 1934^{c}
- Anthonomus tectus LeConte, 1876^{i c b}
- Anthonomus tenebrosus Boheman, 1843^{c}
- Anthonomus tenuicornis Schenkling, S. & Marshall G.A.K., 1934^{c}
- Anthonomus tenuis Fall, 1913^{i c b}
- Anthonomus terreus Gyllenhal, 1835^{c}
- Anthonomus tessellatus Walsh, 1866^{c}
- Anthonomus testaceosquamosus Linell, 1897^{i c b}
- Anthonomus testaceus Boheman, 1843^{c}
- Anthonomus texanus Dietz, 1891^{i c b}
- Anthonomus thurberiae Pierce, 1913^{c}
- Anthonomus thyasocnemoides Hustache, A., 1922^{c}
- Anthonomus thyasocnemoidus Hustache, 1930^{c}
- Anthonomus tibialis Hustache, 1940^{c}
- Anthonomus tigrinus Suffrian, E., 1871^{c}
- Anthonomus tomentosus Clark, 1987^{c}
- Anthonomus torpidus Clark in Clark & Burke, 1996^{c}
- Anthonomus townsendi Jones & Burke, 1997^{c}
- Anthonomus transliensis Ter-Minasian, 1936^{c}
- Anthonomus tremendus Clark, 1990^{c}
- Anthonomus triangularis Champion, 1910^{c}
- Anthonomus triangulifer Schenkling, S. & Marshall G.A.K., 1934^{c}
- Anthonomus trica Clark, 1993^{c}
- Anthonomus tricolor ^{c}
- Anthonomus tricopis Clark, 1991^{c}
- Anthonomus tricuspis Clark, 1991^{c}
- Anthonomus tridens Fall, H.C., 1909^{c}
- Anthonomus triensis Clark, 1991^{c}
- Anthonomus tripugionis Clark, 1991^{c}
- Anthonomus trisicifer Clark, 1991^{i c}
- Anthonomus tuberculosus Faust, J., 1893^{c}
- Anthonomus tuberosus Gyllenhal, 1835^{c}
- Anthonomus uenoi Kojima & Morimoto, 1994^{c}
- Anthonomus ulmi Schoenherr, 1825^{c}
- Anthonomus undatus Clark, 1990^{c}
- Anthonomus undulatus Gyllenhal, 1835^{c g}
- Anthonomus ungularis LeConte, 1876^{i c b}
- Anthonomus unicolor Faust, J., 1890^{c}
- Anthonomus unicus Blatchley & Leng, 1916^{c}
- Anthonomus uniformis Faust, J., 1890^{c}
- Anthonomus unipustulatus Schenkling, S. & Marshall G.A.K., 1934^{c b}
- Anthonomus uniseriatus Champion, 1910^{c}
- Anthonomus univestis Schenkling and Marshall, 1934^{i c}
- Anthonomus univestris Voss, 1944^{c}
- Anthonomus v-notatus Schenkling, S. & Marshall G.A.K., 1934^{c}
- Anthonomus valentis Clark, 1992^{c}
- Anthonomus vanini Clark, 1987^{c}
- Anthonomus vanus Clark, 1991^{c}
- Anthonomus variabilis Philippi, 1864^{c g}
- Anthonomus varians Germar, 1817^{c}
- Anthonomus varicolor Gyllenhal, 1835^{c}
- Anthonomus variegatus Dejean, 1821^{c}
- Anthonomus varipes Jacquelin du Val, 1857^{i c}
- Anthonomus varius Schenkling, S. & Marshall G.A.K., 1934^{c}
- Anthonomus venustus Schenkling, S. & Marshall G.A.K., 1934^{c}
- Anthonomus veracruzensis Sleeper, 1958^{c}
- Anthonomus veraepacis Schenkling, S. & Marshall G.A.K., 1934^{c}
- Anthonomus verrucosus Suffrian, E., 1871^{c}
- Anthonomus vesculus Clark, 1993^{c}
- Anthonomus vespertinus Dietz, 1891^{c}
- Anthonomus vestitus Boheman, C.H., 1859^{c}
- Anthonomus veternosus Clark in Clark & Burke, 1996^{c}
- Anthonomus victim Clark, 1993^{c}
- Anthonomus villaticus Clark, 1990^{c}
- Anthonomus vinarius Clark, 1991^{c}
- Anthonomus virgo Dietz, 1891^{c}
- Anthonomus vis Clark, 1992^{c}
- Anthonomus vulpinus Dietz, 1891^{c}
- Anthonomus vulturiscus Clark & Burke, 1985^{c}
- Anthonomus werneri Clark, 1996^{c}
- Anthonomus whiteheadi Clark, 1991^{c}
- Anthonomus wickhami Clark, 1988^{c}
- Anthonomus wissadulae Burke, 1979^{c}
- Anthonomus xanthocnemus Dietz, 1891^{i c b}
- Anthonomus xanthopus Boheman, 1843^{c}
- Anthonomus xanthoxyli Linell, 1897^{i c b}
- Anthonomus xanthus Blatchley, 1925^{c}
- Anthonomus xantus Blatchley, W.S., 1925^{c}
- Anthonomus yarae Clark, 1990^{c}
- Anthonomus ylem Clark, 1991^{c}
- Anthonomus yoroi Kojima, 2010^{c}
- Anthonomus yuasi Kôno, 1939^{c}
- Anthonomus yucatanus Champion, G.C., 1903^{c}
- Anthonomus zagluli Clark & Burke, 1985^{c}
- Anthonomus zonarius Kirsch, T., 1874^{c}
- Anthonomus zunilensis Schenkling, S. & Marshall G.A.K., 1934^{c}
- Furcipus des Loges, 1868^{g}

Data sources: i = ITIS, c = Catalogue of Life, g = GBIF, b = Bugguide.net
