= A. disjunctus =

A. disjunctus may refer to:

- Abacetus disjunctus, a ground beetle
- Anthonomus disjunctus, a weevil found in North America
