= Anthonomus elutus =

Scientific classification
- Kingdom: Animalia
- Phylum: Arthropoda
- Clade: Pancrustacea
- Class: Insecta
- Order: Coleoptera
- Suborder: Polyphaga
- Infraorder: Cucujiformia
- Superfamily: Curculionoidea
- Family: Curculionidae
- Genus: Anthonomus
- Species: A. elutus

Binomial name
- Anthonomus elutus Clark

Species of beetle

Anthonomus elutus is a weevil native to Central America. It was first found on a wetland nightshade (Solanum tampicense) in Monterrico, Departamento Santa Rosa, Guatemala in February 2006.

A. elutus is being investigated for use a potential biocontrol agent in Florida, which is suffering from an invasion on S. tampicense in wetland habitats. Tests conducted in Gainesville indicated that the weevil was highly specific to S. tampicense.
