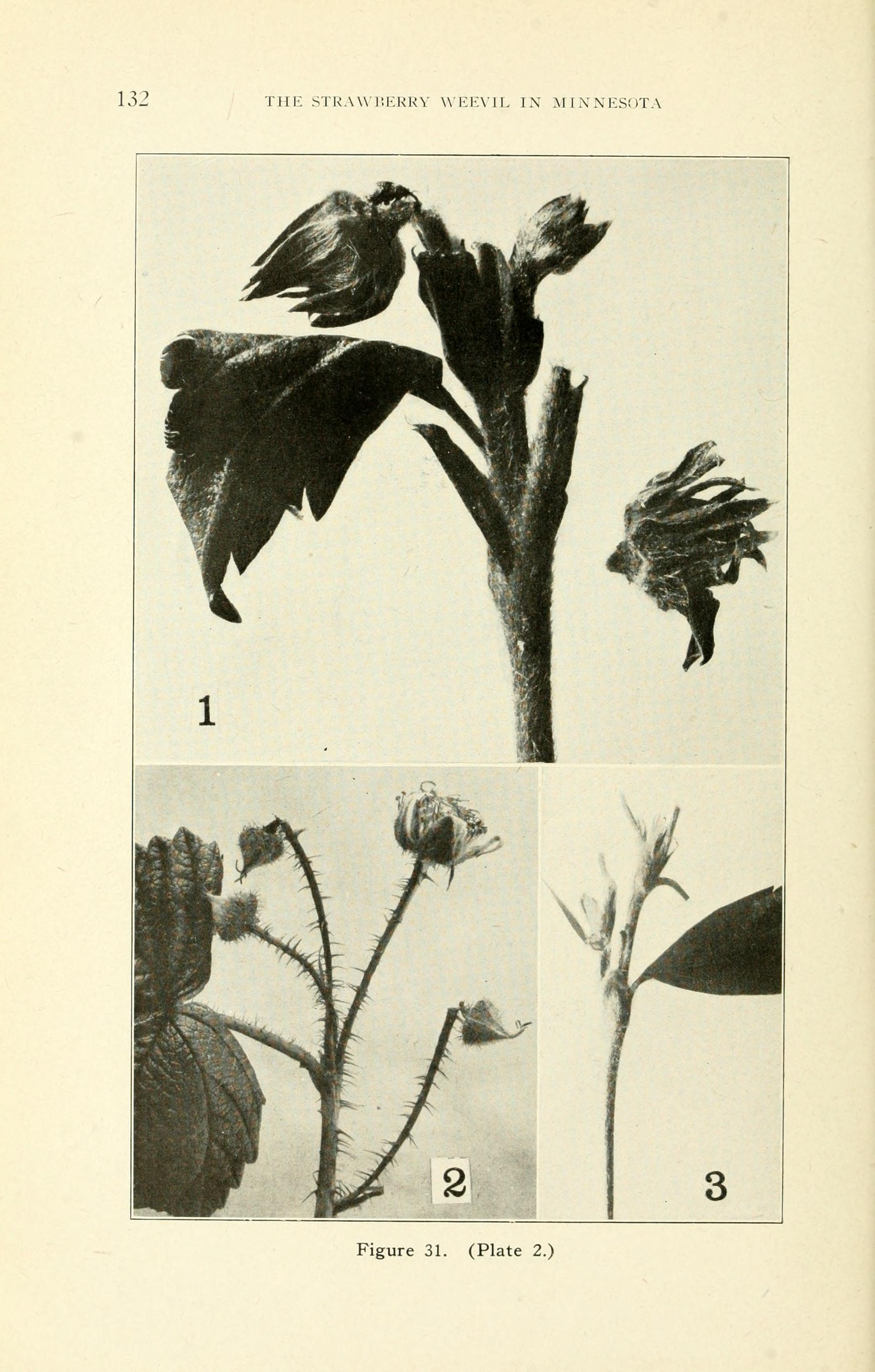
- Images of a plant affected by the strawberry weevil

Scientific classification
- Kingdom: Animalia
- Phylum: Arthropoda
- Clade: Pancrustacea
- Class: Insecta
- Order: Coleoptera
- Suborder: Polyphaga
- Infraorder: Cucujiformia
- Superfamily: Curculionoidea
- Family: Curculionidae
- Genus: Anthonomus
- Species: A. signatus

Binomial name
- Anthonomus signatus Say

= Anthonomus signatus =

Species of beetle

Anthonomus signatus, the strawberry bud weevil, is a weevil that is a significant pest of strawberries in North America. It is also thought to be a major pest to raspberries. It is native to North America.

== Life history ==
The adult weevil is about 1/8 of an inch with copper, black and white stripes. They are generalists and eat the pollen of their host plants. Female A. signatus lay their eggs on flower buds and then sever the bud from the plant. This habit has given rise to another common name for the species, 'Clipper'. Each female can lay up to 75 eggs per season.

== See also ==
- Anthonomus rubi (strawberry blossom weevil)
