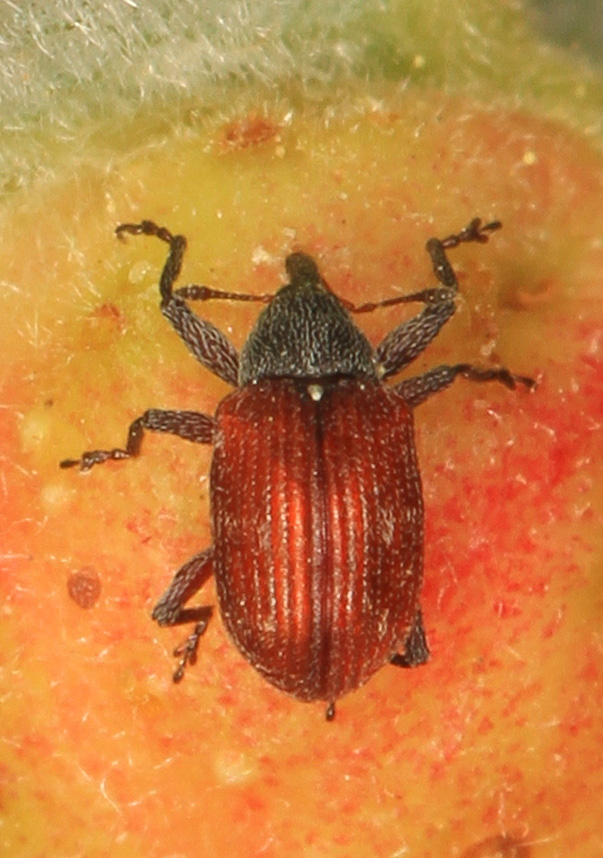

Scientific classification
- Kingdom: Animalia
- Phylum: Arthropoda
- Clade: Pancrustacea
- Class: Insecta
- Order: Coleoptera
- Suborder: Polyphaga
- Infraorder: Cucujiformia
- Superfamily: Curculionoidea
- Family: Curculionidae
- Genus: Anthonomus
- Species: A. haematopus

Binomial name
- Anthonomus haematopus Boheman, 1843

Synonyms
- Anthonomus sycophanta Walsh, 1867

= Anthonomus haematopus =

Species of beetle

Anthonomus haematopus is a species of true weevil in the beetle family Curculionidae. It is found in North America.
