= Anthonomus consors =

Scientific classification
- Kingdom: Animalia
- Phylum: Arthropoda
- Clade: Pancrustacea
- Class: Insecta
- Order: Coleoptera
- Suborder: Polyphaga
- Infraorder: Cucujiformia
- Superfamily: Curculionoidea
- Family: Curculionidae
- Genus: Anthonomus
- Species: A. consors

Binomial name
- Anthonomus consors (Dietz, 1891)

Species of beetle

Anthonomus consors, the cherry curculio, is a species of true weevil in the beetle family Curculionidae.
