= Anthonomus testaceosquamosus =

Scientific classification
- Kingdom: Animalia
- Phylum: Arthropoda
- Clade: Pancrustacea
- Class: Insecta
- Order: Coleoptera
- Suborder: Polyphaga
- Infraorder: Cucujiformia
- Superfamily: Curculionoidea
- Family: Curculionidae
- Genus: Anthonomus
- Species: A. testaceosquamosus

Binomial name
- Anthonomus testaceosquamosus Linell, 1897

Species of weevil

Anthonomus testaceosquamosus is a species of true weevil in the beetle family Curculionidae. It is found in North America. Its common name is the hibiscus bud weevil, as females lay their eggs in hibiscus flower buds.
