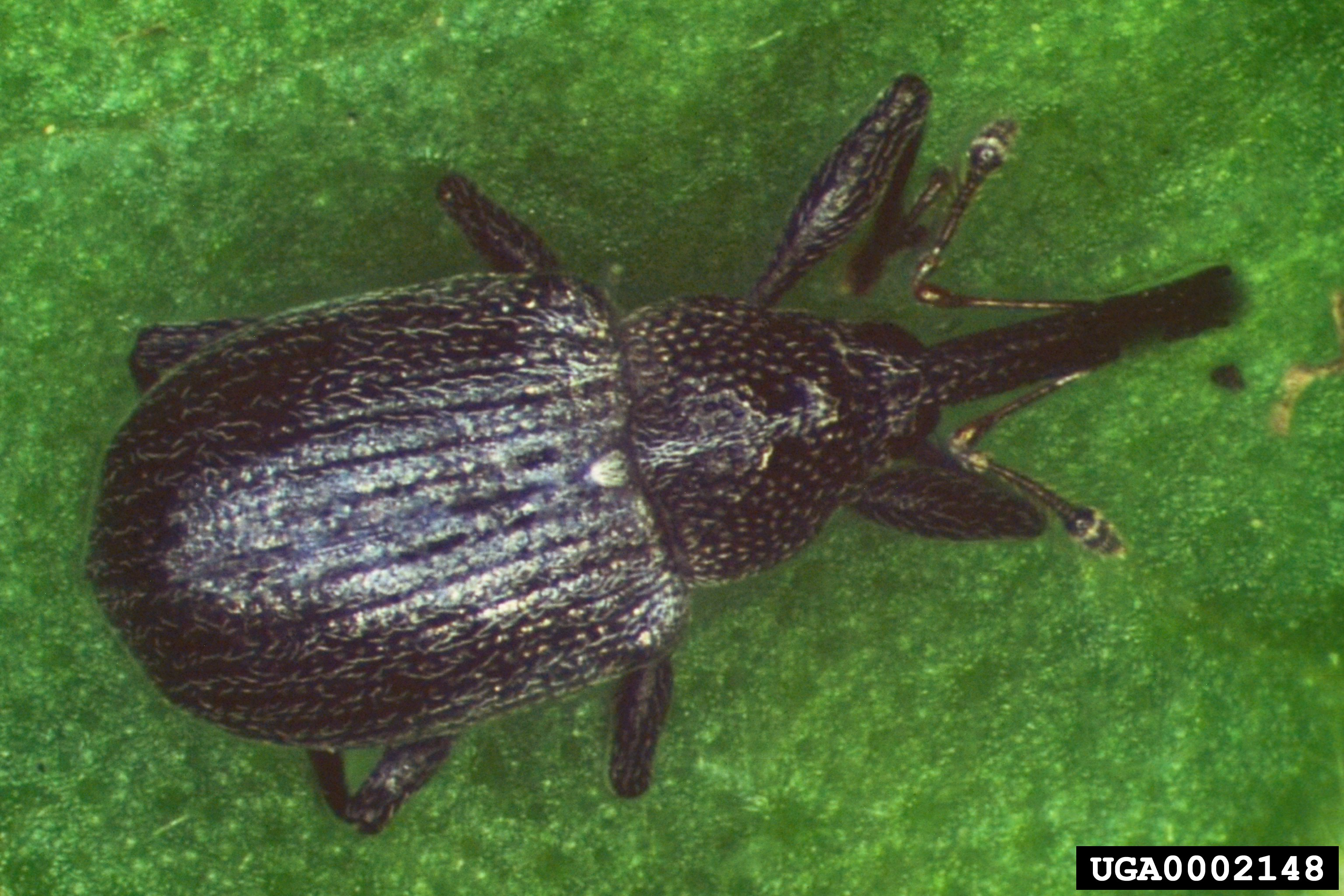

Scientific classification
- Kingdom: Animalia
- Phylum: Arthropoda
- Clade: Pancrustacea
- Class: Insecta
- Order: Coleoptera
- Suborder: Polyphaga
- Infraorder: Cucujiformia
- Superfamily: Curculionoidea
- Family: Curculionidae
- Genus: Anthonomus
- Species: A. tenebrosus

Binomial name
- Anthonomus tenebrosus Boheman, 1843

= Anthonomus tenebrosus =

Species of beetle

Anthonomus tenebrosus is a flowerbud weevil native to South America.

Anthonomus tenebrosus is being investigated for use a potential biocontrol agent for tropical soda apple (Solanum viarum), mainly in the Southeastern United States.
