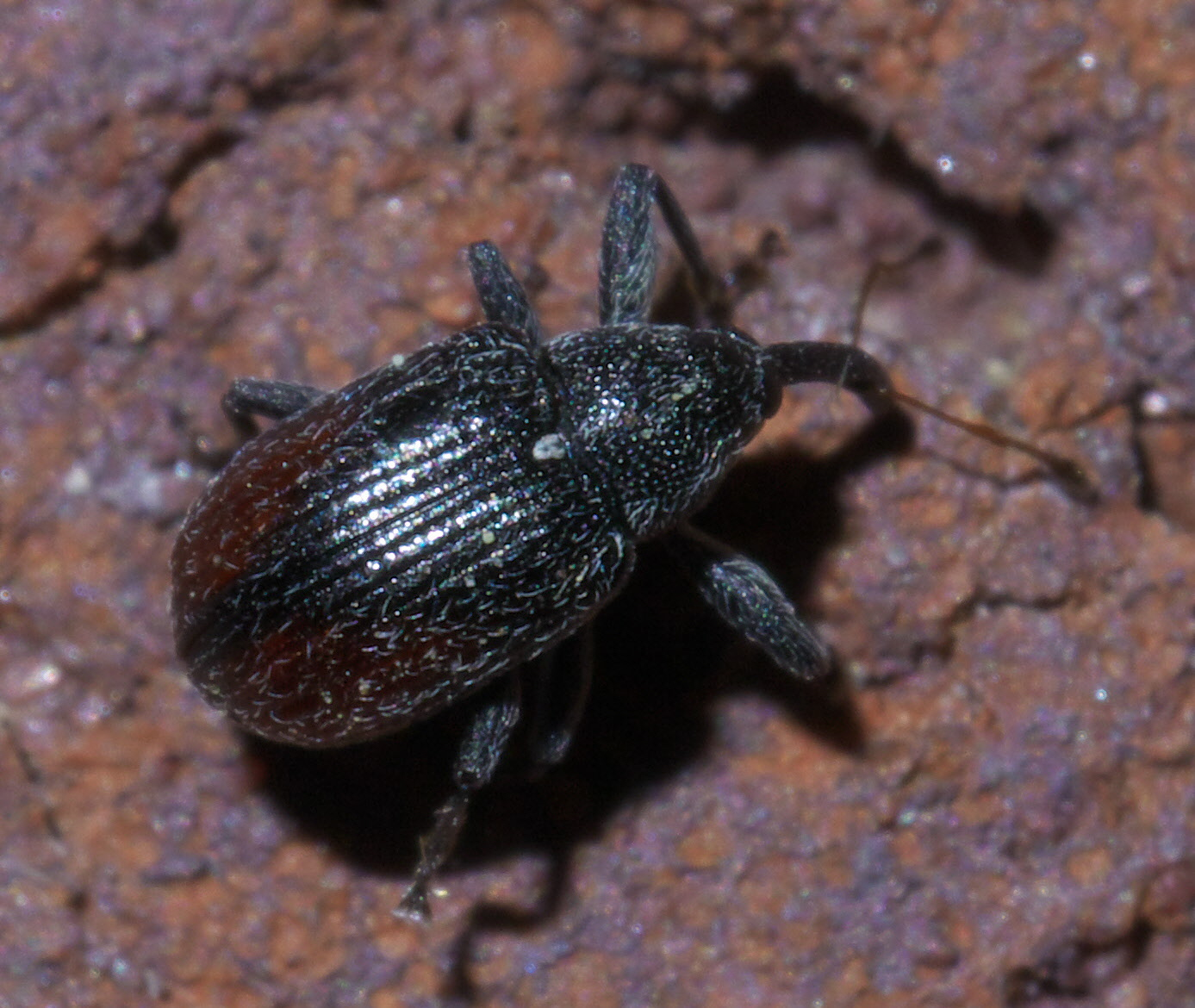

Scientific classification
- Kingdom: Animalia
- Phylum: Arthropoda
- Clade: Pancrustacea
- Class: Insecta
- Order: Coleoptera
- Suborder: Polyphaga
- Infraorder: Cucujiformia
- Superfamily: Curculionoidea
- Family: Curculionidae
- Genus: Anthonomus
- Species: A. suturalis

Binomial name
- Anthonomus suturalis LeConte, 1824

Synonyms
- Anthonomus erythropterus Say, 1831; Anthonomus flavicornis Boheman, 1843; Anthonomus hicoriae Pierce, 1908; Anthonomus vespertinus Dietz, 1891

= Anthonomus suturalis =

Species of beetle

Anthonomus suturalis is a species of true weevil in the beetle family Curculionidae. It is found in North America.

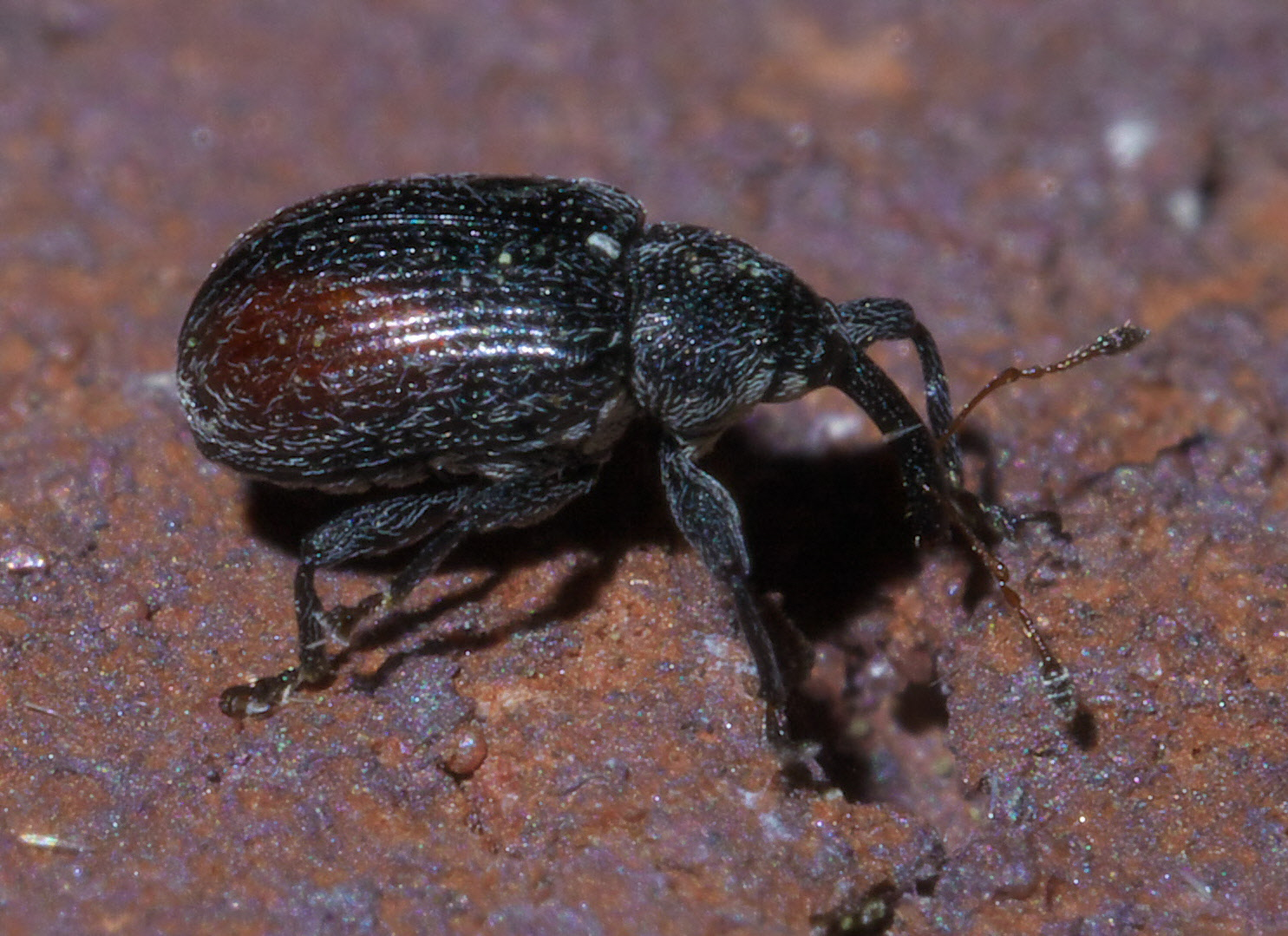
