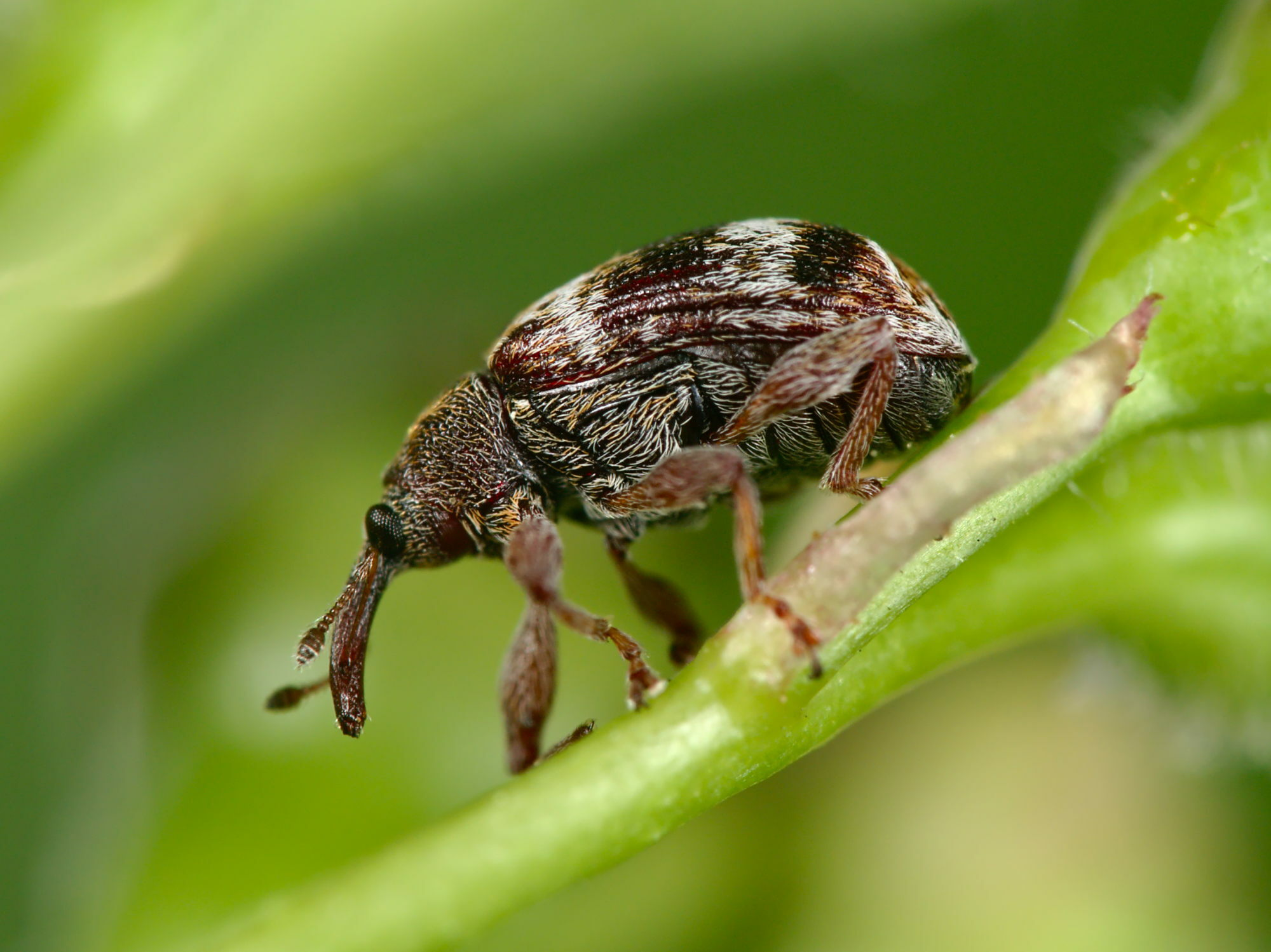

Scientific classification
- Kingdom: Animalia
- Phylum: Arthropoda
- Class: Insecta
- Order: Coleoptera
- Suborder: Polyphaga
- Infraorder: Cucujiformia
- Family: Curculionidae
- Genus: Anthonomus
- Species: A. pedicularius

Binomial name
- Anthonomus pedicularius (Linnaeus, 1758)

= Anthonomus pedicularius =

Lice Weevil

Species of beetle

Anthonomus pedicularius, the lice weevil, is a species of weevil native to Europe.

== Etymology ==
The lice weevil gets its name from its scientific name, Anthonomus pedicularius, particularly pedicularius, meaning pediculosis, which is the infestation of lice on a person.
