= Anthonomus fulvus =

Scientific classification
- Kingdom: Animalia
- Phylum: Arthropoda
- Clade: Pancrustacea
- Class: Insecta
- Order: Coleoptera
- Suborder: Polyphaga
- Infraorder: Cucujiformia
- Superfamily: Curculionoidea
- Family: Curculionidae
- Genus: Anthonomus
- Species: A. fulvus

Binomial name
- Anthonomus fulvus LeConte, 1858

Species of beetle

Anthonomus fulvus, the winecup weevil, is a species of true weevil in the beetle family Curculionidae. It is found in North America.
