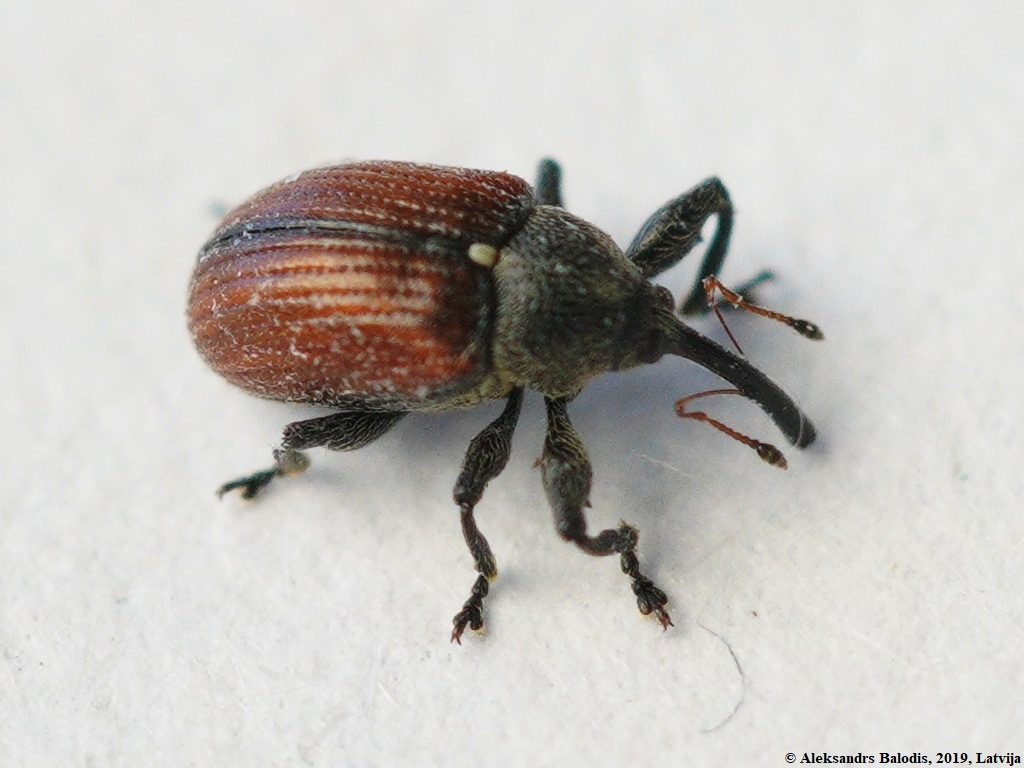

Scientific classification
- Kingdom: Animalia
- Phylum: Arthropoda
- Clade: Pancrustacea
- Class: Insecta
- Order: Coleoptera
- Suborder: Polyphaga
- Infraorder: Cucujiformia
- Superfamily: Curculionoidea
- Family: Curculionidae
- Genus: Anthonomus
- Species: A. phyllocola

Binomial name
- Anthonomus phyllocola Herbst

= Anthonomus phyllocola =

Species of beetle

Anthonomus phyllocola is a weevil and a major pest of lodgepole pine (Pinus contorta) in Scandinavia.

== Life history ==
Larvae develop in the male flowers of lodgepole pine.
