= Anthonomus convictus =

Scientific classification
- Kingdom: Animalia
- Phylum: Arthropoda
- Clade: Pancrustacea
- Class: Insecta
- Order: Coleoptera
- Suborder: Polyphaga
- Infraorder: Cucujiformia
- Superfamily: Curculionoidea
- Family: Curculionidae
- Genus: Anthonomus
- Species: A. convictus

Binomial name
- Anthonomus convictus Gates, 1972

Species of beetle

Anthonomus convictus is a species of true weevil in the family of beetles known as Curculionidae. It is found in North America, where it lives within the galls of Heliozela aesella.
