= Anthonomus lecontei =

Scientific classification
- Kingdom: Animalia
- Phylum: Arthropoda
- Clade: Pancrustacea
- Class: Insecta
- Order: Coleoptera
- Suborder: Polyphaga
- Infraorder: Cucujiformia
- Superfamily: Curculionoidea
- Family: Curculionidae
- Genus: Anthonomus
- Species: A. lecontei

Binomial name
- Anthonomus lecontei Burke, 1975

Species of beetle

Anthonomus lecontei is a species of snout or bark beetle in the family Curculionidae. It is found in North America.
