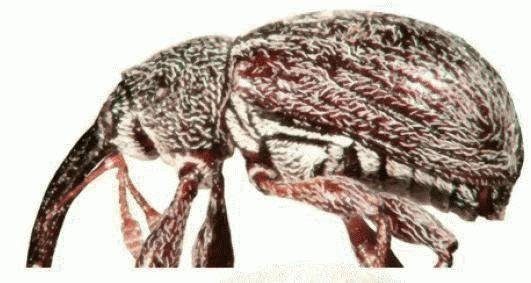

Scientific classification
- Kingdom: Animalia
- Phylum: Arthropoda
- Clade: Pancrustacea
- Class: Insecta
- Order: Coleoptera
- Suborder: Polyphaga
- Infraorder: Cucujiformia
- Superfamily: Curculionoidea
- Family: Curculionidae
- Genus: Anthonomus
- Species: A. aeneolus

Binomial name
- Anthonomus aeneolus Dietz, 1891

Synonyms
- Anthonomus brevirostris Linell, 1897

= Anthonomus aeneolus =

Species of beetle

Anthonomus aeneolus is a species of true weevil in the beetle family Curculionidae. It is found in North America. It normally develops within the flower buds of Solanum flowers, although eggs can be laid within galls on the plant. Larvae feed on the anthers of the flowers.
