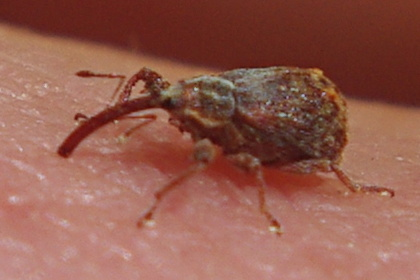

Scientific classification
- Kingdom: Animalia
- Phylum: Arthropoda
- Clade: Pancrustacea
- Class: Insecta
- Order: Coleoptera
- Suborder: Polyphaga
- Infraorder: Cucujiformia
- Superfamily: Curculionoidea
- Family: Curculionidae
- Genus: Anthonomus
- Species: A. quadrigibbus

Binomial name
- Anthonomus quadrigibbus Say, 1831

Synonyms
- Tachypterellus cerasi List, 1932; Tachypterellus magnus List, 1932

= Anthonomus quadrigibbus =

Species of beetle

Anthonomus quadrigibbus, the apple curculio, is a species of true weevil in the beetle family Curculionidae. It is found in North America.
