= Anthonomus morticinus =

Scientific classification
- Kingdom: Animalia
- Phylum: Arthropoda
- Clade: Pancrustacea
- Class: Insecta
- Order: Coleoptera
- Suborder: Polyphaga
- Infraorder: Cucujiformia
- Superfamily: Curculionoidea
- Family: Curculionidae
- Genus: Anthonomus
- Species: A. morticinus

Binomial name
- Anthonomus morticinus Clark, 1996

Species of beetle

Anthonomus morticinus is a weevil native to Brazil. Its host plant is Solanum mauritianum and it is being considered as a potential biocontrol agent for this plant in South Africa.
