= Anthonomus robustulus =

Scientific classification
- Kingdom: Animalia
- Phylum: Arthropoda
- Clade: Pancrustacea
- Class: Insecta
- Order: Coleoptera
- Suborder: Polyphaga
- Infraorder: Cucujiformia
- Superfamily: Curculionoidea
- Family: Curculionidae
- Genus: Anthonomus
- Species: A. robustulus

Binomial name
- Anthonomus robustulus LeConte, 1876

Synonyms
- Anthonomus moleculus Casey, 1885

Species of beetle

Anthonomus robustulus is a species of true weevil in the beetle family Curculionidae. It is found in North America. This species is described by its 6-jointed funicle, and light bluish-gray scales.
