= Anthonomus musculus =

Cranberry weevil
- Adult cranberry weevil feeding on blueberry flower bud

Scientific classification
- Kingdom: Animalia
- Phylum: Arthropoda
- Clade: Pancrustacea
- Class: Insecta
- Order: Coleoptera
- Suborder: Polyphaga
- Infraorder: Cucujiformia
- Superfamily: Curculionoidea
- Family: Curculionidae
- Genus: Anthonomus
- Species: A. musculus

Binomial name
- Anthonomus musculus Say, 1832

Species of beetle

Anthonomus musculus, the cranberry weevil, is a pest of blueberries and cranberries in Massachusetts, New Jersey, Wisconsin, and Michigan. A. musculus is native to North America and ranges from New England to Florida and west of the Rocky Mountains.

== Description ==
Adult cranberry weevils are tiny reddish-brown beetles approximately 1.6 to 2.0 millimeters long. They are stout, oval-shaped, and have a curved snout typical of weevils. The eggs are smooth, oblong, and a pale-yellow color approximately 0.4 to 0.5 millimeters long.

== Life history ==
Females deposit eggs in flower buds, and larvae develop inside, preventing fruit development. Adults are active during the day and feed on flowers, leaves, and buds. A. musculus is attracted to damaged cranberry flower buds. A. musculus males are attracted to volatile chemicals (hexanol, (Z)-3-hexenyl acetate, hexyl acetate, and (Z)-3-hexenyl butyrate) that blueberry buds emit.

In addition to cultivated cranberry and blueberry plants, host plants for cranberry weevil include swamp sweetbells, staggerbush, dangleberry, sheep laurel, swamp honeysuckle, and chokeberry.
