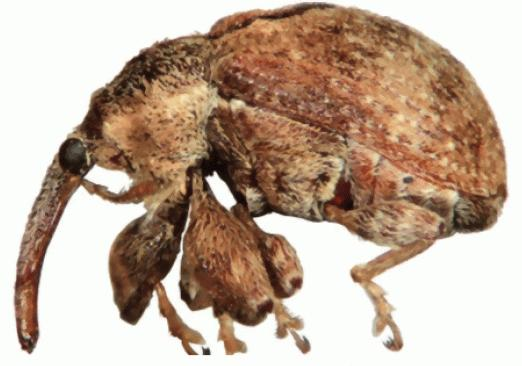

Scientific classification
- Kingdom: Animalia
- Phylum: Arthropoda
- Clade: Pancrustacea
- Class: Insecta
- Order: Coleoptera
- Suborder: Polyphaga
- Infraorder: Cucujiformia
- Superfamily: Curculionoidea
- Family: Curculionidae
- Genus: Anthonomus
- Species: A. eugenii

Binomial name
- Anthonomus eugenii Cano, 1894

Synonyms
- Anthonomus aeneotinctus Champion, 1903

= Anthonomus eugenii =

Species of beetle

Anthonomus eugenii is known as the pepper weevil. This beetle feeds and lays eggs on plants in the genus Capsicum and a few species in the genus Solanum. A. eugenii is native to Mexico, however, it is an important pest of Capsicum in Florida, Puerto Rico, and Central America.

== Identification ==
Adult A. eugenii are dark brown in colour with cream coloured scales covering their bodies. They are approximately 3 millimetres in length and have an oval-shaped body. A. eugenii have a curved rostrum, which is characteristic of the genus Anthonomus. Female A. eugenii have a greater length between the antennae and mandibles on the rostrum, which is thought to aid in burrowing into host plants for oviposition.

== Distribution ==
A. eugenii are predominately found throughout Mexico, Central America, the Caribbean, and the southernmost states of the United States of America. The northern range of A. eugenii is limited by cold temperatures and the lack of plant host material during winter months. However, economically damaging A. eugenii infestations have been reported in more northern areas, such as Canada, the Netherlands, and some northern states of the United States of America. These infestations are thought to occur from the importation of infested fruit.

== Life cycle ==
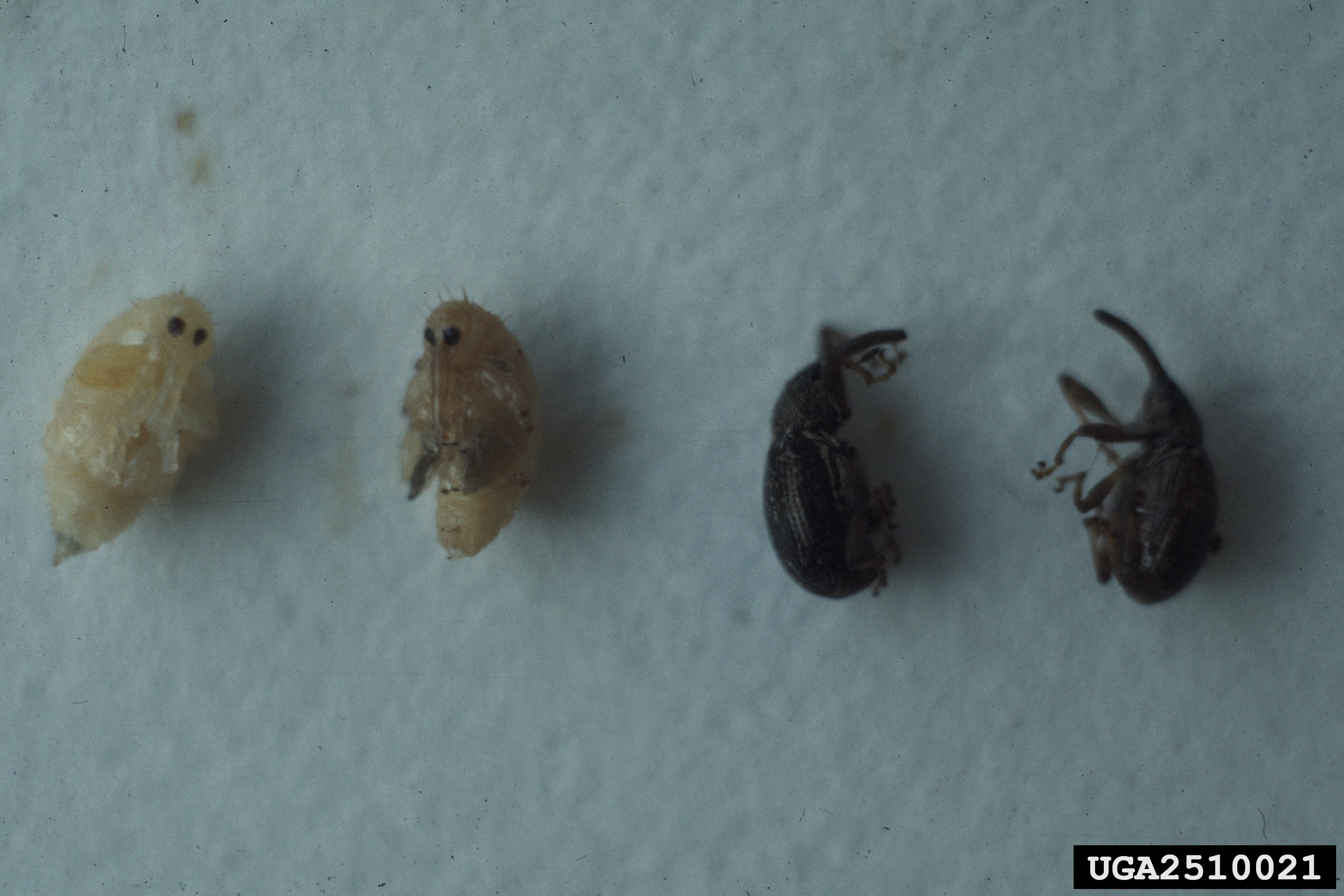
A. eugenii pupae and adults.

Female A. eugenii create an egg cavity in host plants using their mouthparts and deposit a single egg within this cavity, then the cavity is covered with a light brown fluid that eventually hardens and closes the opening. A female can oviposit five to seven eggs per day and A. eugenii females display a mean fecundity of 341 eggs per lifetime. Eggs are pearl-shaped and range from 0.3 to 0.4 millimetres in diameter and the egg stage lasts for approximately 4.3 days. A. eugenii exhibit three instars in their life cycle and the larvae typically develop within the fruits of host plants. Larvae have a legless, c-shaped body with visible setae and progress through three instars in approximately 12.3 days. The pupae form of A. eugenii closely resembles adults and this life stage lasts approximately 4.7 days. Pupation occurs within the host plant and the adult creates a round exit hole when it emerges from the plant. The total duration from egg to adult emergence is 21.3 days.

== Interactions with humans ==
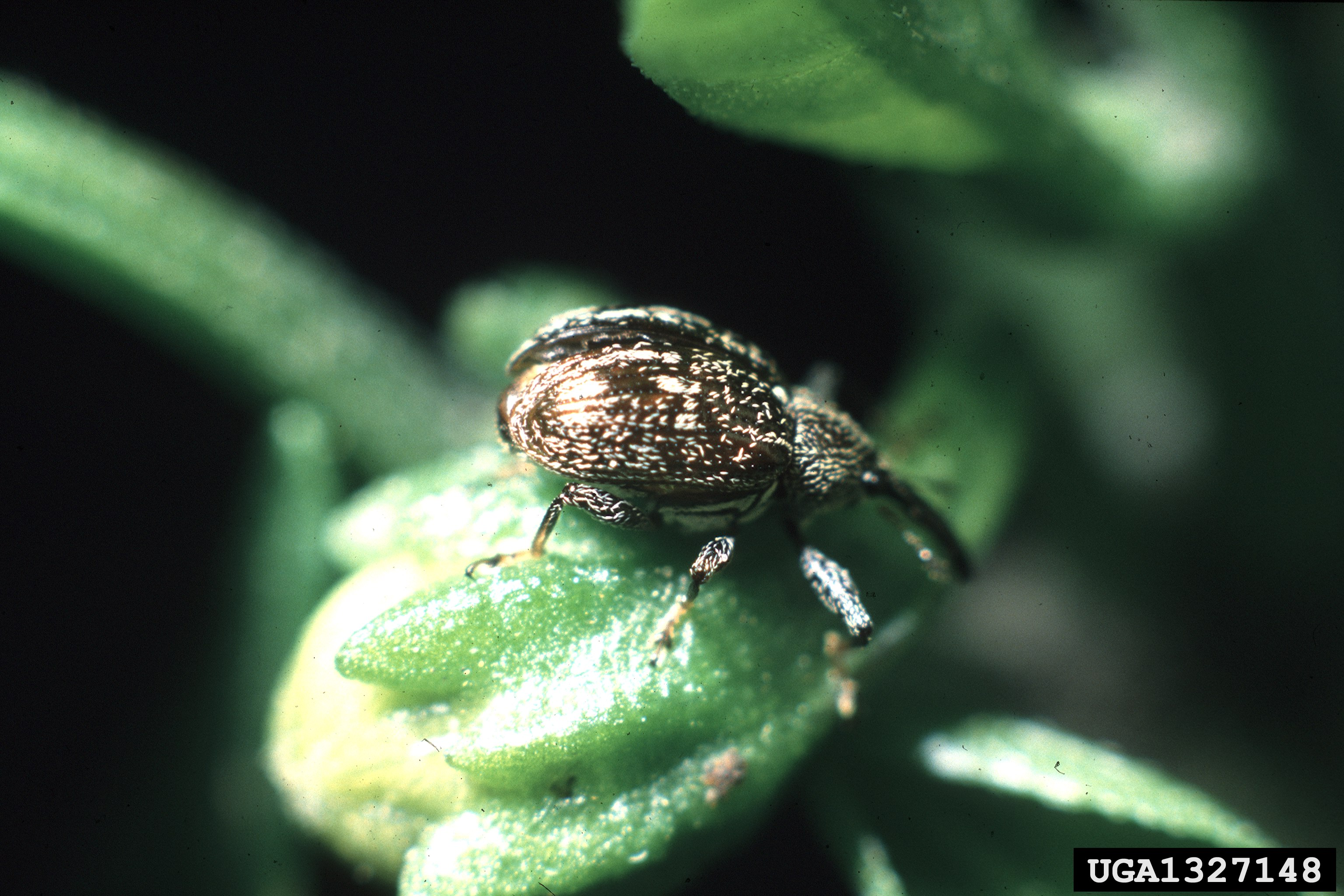
Adult A. eugenii on pepper bud.

A. eugenii is a major pest to farmed pepper plants and displays a large plant host range of several Capsicum species. The adult and larval life stages of A. eugenii inflict the most damage upon crops through oviposition and feeding behaviours. A. eugenii show a preference for young fruits in both feeding and oviposition. Females deposit a single egg into the fruit of the plant host and use pheromones to avoid oviposition on the same fruit. This oviposition behaviour can lead to extensive infestation rates of 70 to 90 percent of a cultivated pepper field. Larvae feed on the internal tissues of the fruit, which causes a significant amount of damage and makes the fruit more susceptible to decay and disease.

=== Pest status ===
The short development time, oviposition preferences and destructive feeding behaviours of A. eugenii make it an important pest of cultivated peppers. A. eugenii have a limited plant host range and species of Capsicum and Solanum are the only known reproductive hosts. However, these plant genera display great diversity and A. eugenii are able to reproduce on a variety of different plant species within the genus Capsicum and Solanum. The ability to reproduce on a variety of different plant host species makes management of A. eugenii infestations difficult, as populations can be maintained in both wild and cultivated plant hosts. Infestation of wild, unmanaged plant hosts creates the potential for A. eugenii populations to re-establish and colonize nearby crops from which the pest had previously been eliminated from. Although A. eugenii feed on and develop within both Capsicum and Solanum species, it is only considered to be a pest of Capsicum.

In Northern Florida seasonal growth and development of A. eugenii is observed, which can help inform pest management strategies. Periods of low infestation rates provide optimal timing for pest control measures, and A. eugenii display the lowest infestation rates in late April, late June, and early August in Florida. Successful management of A. eugenii pests requires an understanding of population dynamics, life history traits, and the use of chemical and biological control methods.

=== Management threshold ===
Action thresholds for the control of A. eugenii pests through the use of insecticides have been developed. One described action threshold is to apply insecticide when A. eugenii infestation levels reach one adult per 100 pepper bud clusters. Additionally, the amount of damage can serve as a practical measure of pest activity. The action threshold for damage is to apply insecticide treatments when five percent of bud clusters are damaged. The use of action thresholds to inform pest management treatments can reduce damage to crops, increase crop yield, and improve net economic returns.

=== Biological control ===
A. eugenii are difficult to control with insecticides because eggs are deposited in flower buds and fruits, which protects larvae and pupae from insecticides. Biological control utilizing natural enemies of A. eugenii have been suggested as pest management strategies. A considerable diversity of Hymenopteran parasitoids have been identified to attack A. eugenii, which highlights a potential for these natural enemies to be implemented in A. eugenii pest management.

Catolaccus hunteri Crawford is the most common parasitoid of A. eugenii in Florida, and this parasitoid wasp has been identified as a potential biological control method for A. eugenii pests. C. hunteri is an external parasitoid, and it mainly attacks third instar A. eugenii that are located within host plants. It is suggested that C. hunteri feeds on the eggs and larvae of A. eugenii, which would aid in the suppression of A. eugenii infestations of cultivated peppers.
