= Anthonomus santacruzi =

Scientific classification
- Kingdom: Animalia
- Phylum: Arthropoda
- Clade: Pancrustacea
- Class: Insecta
- Order: Coleoptera
- Suborder: Polyphaga
- Infraorder: Cucujiformia
- Superfamily: Curculionoidea
- Family: Curculionidae
- Genus: Anthonomus
- Species: A. santacruzi

Binomial name
- Anthonomus santacruzi Hustache, 1924

Species of beetle

Anthonomus santacruzi is a species of weevil that is a promising biocontrol agent for Solanum mauritianum, a major ecological weed in high-rainfall regions of South Africa.

The weevil exhibits a preference for S. mauritianum and possibly two South African native species of Solanum, namely S. linnaeanum and S. tomentosum.
