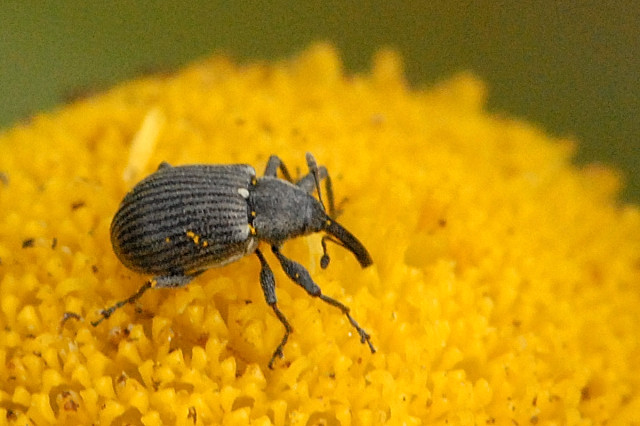

Scientific classification
- Kingdom: Animalia
- Phylum: Arthropoda
- Clade: Pancrustacea
- Class: Insecta
- Order: Coleoptera
- Suborder: Polyphaga
- Infraorder: Cucujiformia
- Superfamily: Curculionoidea
- Family: Curculionidae
- Genus: Anthonomus
- Species: A. rubi

Binomial name
- Anthonomus rubi (Herbst, 1795)

Synonyms
- Curculio rubi Herbst, 1795; Curculio ater Marsham, 1802; Curculio melanopterus Marsham, 1802; Anthonomus (Anthonomus) obscurus Stephens, 1831; Anthonomus (Anthonomus) gracilipes Desbrochers, 1873; Anthonomus (Anthonomus) leptopus Gozis, 1881; Anthonomus (Anthonomus) uniformis Faust, 1890

= Anthonomus rubi =

Strawberry blossom weevil

Species of beetle

Anthonomus rubi, the strawberry-blossom weevil or strawberry blossom weevil, is a species of weevil found in Europe and western Asia. It feeds on plants of the family Rosaceae and is an important pest of strawberry (Fragaria × ananassa Duchesne) and raspberry (Rubus idaeus L.). This insect is a particularly problematic pest of strawberry in Europe, in some cases responsible for up to 80% loss of the berry crop.

== Ecology and description ==
Adults are 2–4 mm (0.079–0.157 in) long and dull black, covered with a fine grey pubescence. The larvae are 3–3.5 mm (0.12–0.14 in) long, curved, and white with brown head. Adults feed on strawberry foliage, and females lay eggs inside unopened flower buds (one egg per bud) before partially or totally severing the stalk; larvae develop inside the severed buds, feeding on the wilting tissue.

=== Role of pheromones ===
Adults are thought to be attracted to strawberries by chemicals released by the plants. Monoterpenes, sesquiterpenes, and aromatic compounds acted as odorants (attractors) on weevils' receptor neurons. Male A. rubi then release their own blend of aggregation pheromone, three components of which have been shown to attract weevils to baited traps.

== Presence in North America ==
In 2019, Anthonomus rubi was found in Abbotsford, British Columbia, Canada. This represented the first North American record of this species. In 2021, the weevil was found to have crossed into Washington State, USA. In British Columbia, A. rubi feeds on a variety of non-crop hosts that are not present in its native range, including Salmonberry and Thimbleberry.

== See also ==
- Anthonomus signatus (Strawberry bud weevil)
