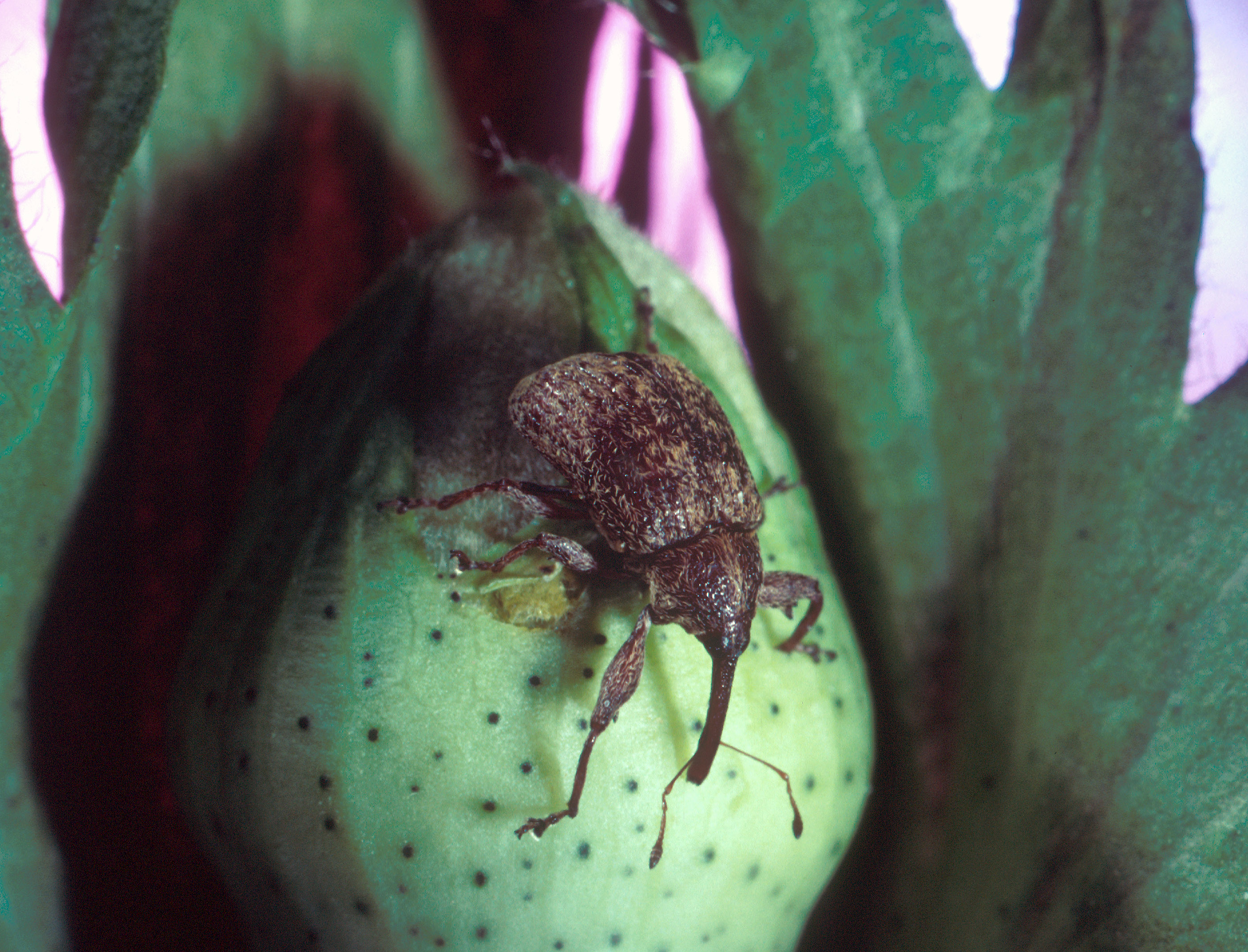
- Anthonomus grandis

Scientific classification
- Domain: Eukaryota
- Kingdom: Animalia
- Phylum: Arthropoda
- Class: Insecta
- Order: Coleoptera
- Suborder: Polyphaga
- Infraorder: Cucujiformia
- Family: Curculionidae
- Tribe: Anthonomini
- Genus: Anthonomus; Germar, 1817

Synonyms
- Furcipus

= Anthonomus =

Genus of beetles

Anthonomus is a genus of weevils. This genus includes major agricultural pests such as the boll weevil, strawberry blossom weevil, and pepper weevil, as well as promising biological pest control agents such as Anthonomus santacruzi.

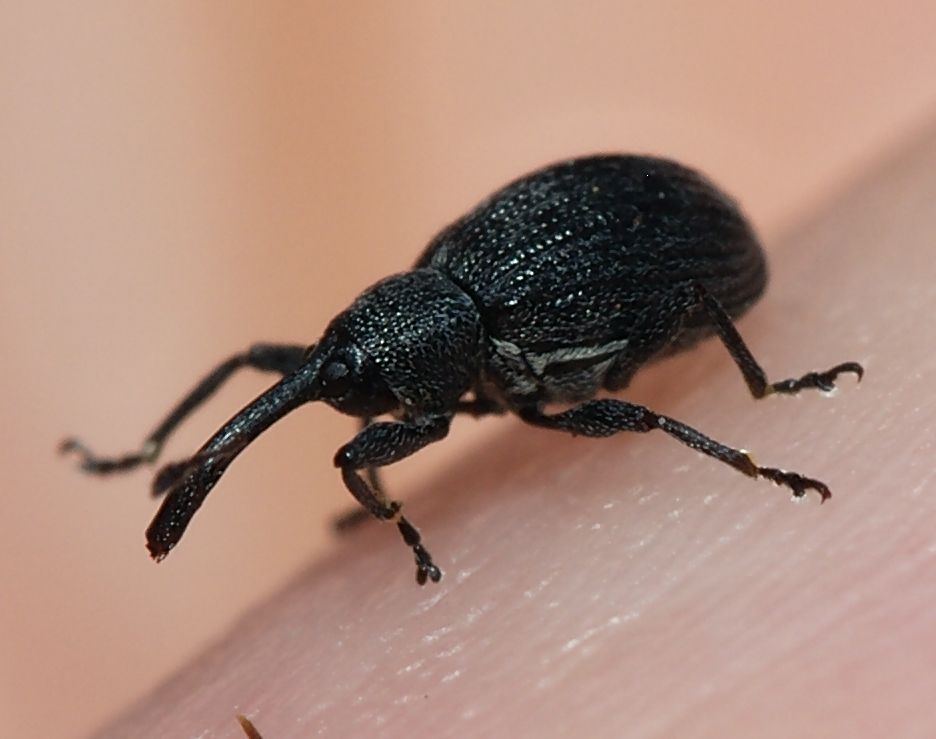
A. rubi from Germany

== Taxonomy ==
The taxonomy of the genus is still under revision. It is unclear whether Cnemocyllus should be a genus or a subgenus within Anthonomus. Research suggests that the genus Hampea in the mallow family was the original host plant for the A. grandis species group.

== See also ==
- List of Anthonomus species
