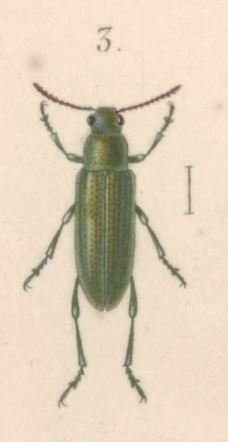

Scientific classification
- Kingdom: Animalia
- Phylum: Arthropoda
- Class: Insecta
- Order: Coleoptera
- Suborder: Polyphaga
- Infraorder: Cucujiformia
- Family: Chrysomelidae
- Subfamily: Bruchinae
- Tribe: Rhaebini
- Genus: Rhaebus
- Species: R. gebleri

Binomial name
- Rhaebus gebleri Fischer von Waldheim, 1824
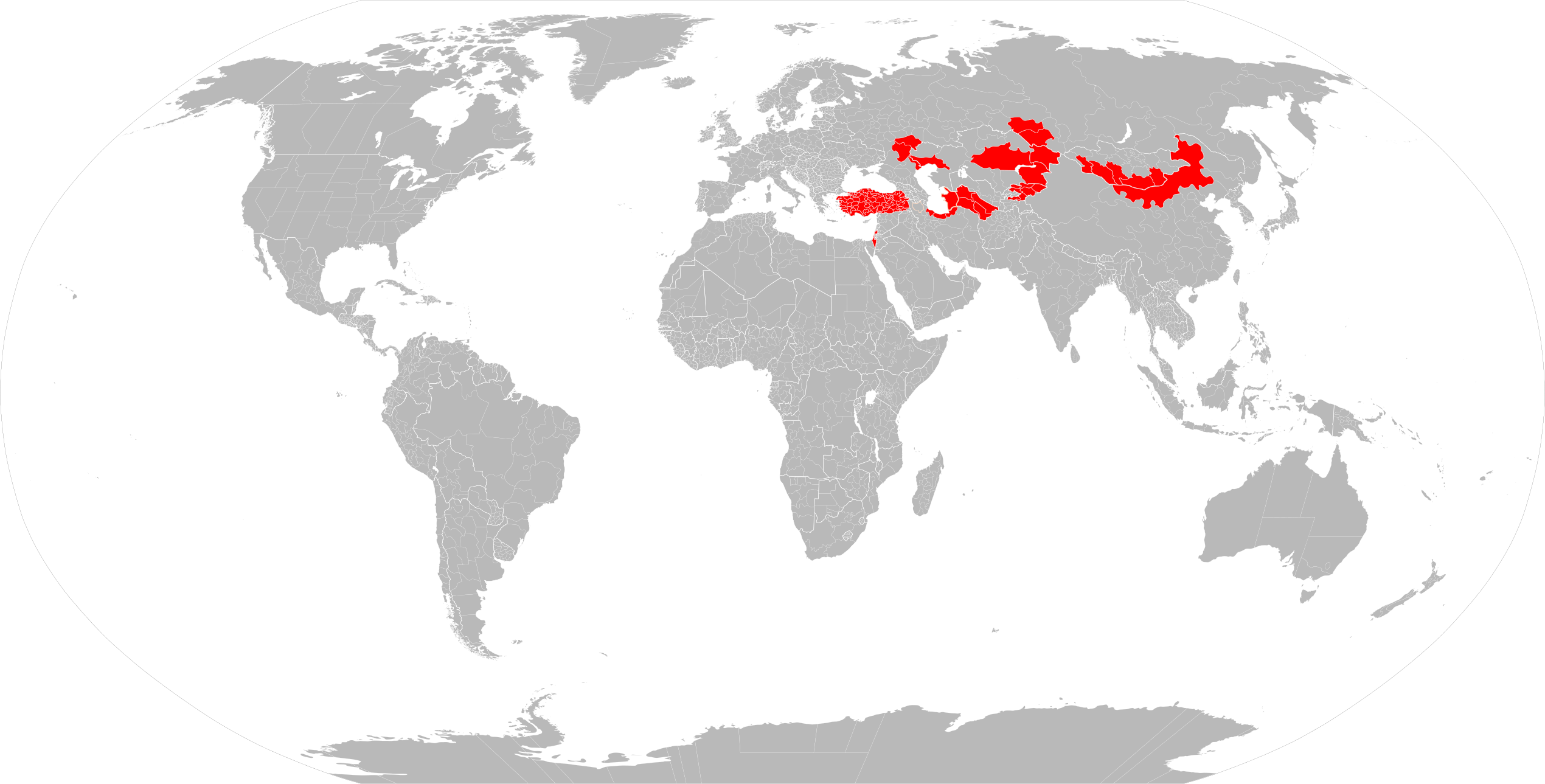

Synonyms
- Rh. mannerheimi; Rh. komarovi; Rh. amnoni

= Rhaebus gebleri =

Species of seed beetle

Rhaebus gebleri is a species of bean weevil in the tribe Rhaebini. This species was described by Gotthelf Fischer von Waldheim in 1824, and is the type species of the genus Rhaebus.

== Distribution ==
Rhaebus gebleri is restricted to the Palearctic realm, and is found in South-western Russia, Turkey, Israel, Iran, Kazakhstan, and Mongolia. It is found in semi-desert and steppes, especially near the shores of saline ponds and lakes.
