= Megacerus discoidus =

Scientific classification
- Kingdom: Animalia
- Phylum: Arthropoda
- Clade: Pancrustacea
- Class: Insecta
- Order: Coleoptera
- Suborder: Polyphaga
- Infraorder: Cucujiformia
- Family: Chrysomelidae
- Genus: Megacerus
- Species: M. discoidus

Binomial name
- Megacerus discoidus (Say, 1824)

Species of beetle

Megacerus discoidus is a species of pea or bean weevil in the family Chrysomelidae. It is found in Central America and North America.
