= Rhaebus =

Rhaebus (Greek: ραιβὸς curved) may refer to:

- Rhaebus (beetle), a genus of insects in the family Chrysomelidae
- Rhaebus, the horse of the mythical king Mezentius
