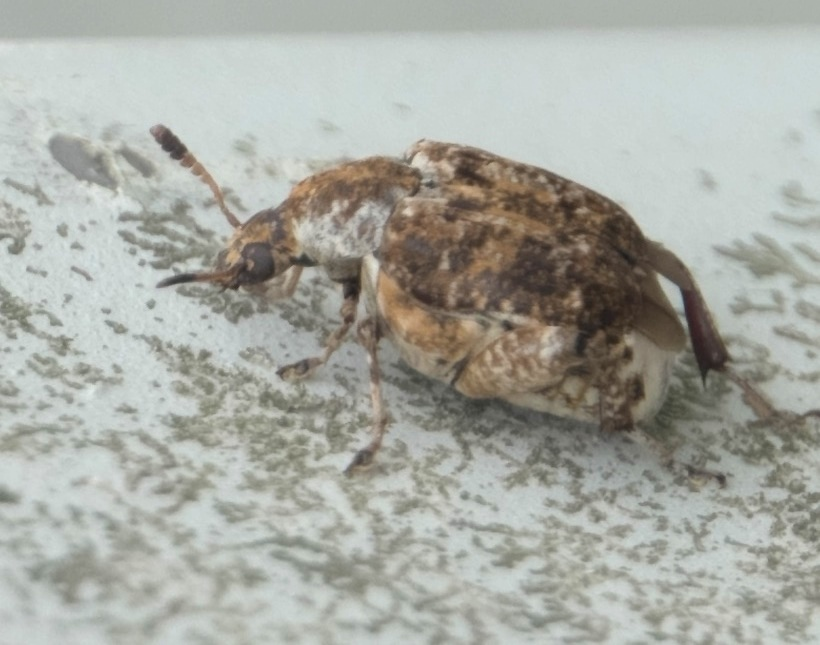

Scientific classification
- Kingdom: Animalia
- Phylum: Arthropoda
- Class: Insecta
- Order: Coleoptera
- Suborder: Polyphaga
- Infraorder: Cucujiformia
- Family: Chrysomelidae
- Subfamily: Bruchinae
- Tribe: Bruchini
- Genus: Merobruchus; Bridwell, 1946

= Merobruchus =

Genus of beetles

Merobruchus is a genus of pea and bean weevils in the beetle family Chrysomelidae. There are more than 20 described species in Merobruchus.

== Species ==
These 21 species belong to the genus Merobruchus:

- Merobruchus bicoloripes Pic, 1927
- Merobruchus boucheri Kingsolver
- Merobruchus chetumalae Kingsolver
- Merobruchus hastatus Kingsolver
- Merobruchus insolitus (Sharp, 1885)
- Merobruchus julianus (Horn, 1894)
- Merobruchus knulli (White, 1941)
- Merobruchus lysilomae Kingsolver, 1988
- Merobruchus major (Fall, 1912) (Texas ebony bruchid)
- Merobruchus paquetae Kingsolver
- Merobruchus pickeli
- Merobruchus placidus (Horn, 1873)
- Merobruchus politus Kingsolver
- Merobruchus poryphreus Kingsolver
- Merobruchus santarosae Kingsolver
- Merobruchus santiagoi Ribeiro-Costa, 2007
- Merobruchus sonorensis Kingsolver
- Merobruchus terani Kingsolver, 1980
- Merobruchus triacanthus Kingsolver
- Merobruchus vacillator (Sharp, 1885)
- Merobruchus xanthopygus Kingsolver
