= Mimosestes nubigens =

Scientific classification
- Kingdom: Animalia
- Phylum: Arthropoda
- Class: Insecta
- Order: Coleoptera
- Suborder: Polyphaga
- Infraorder: Cucujiformia
- Family: Chrysomelidae
- Genus: Mimosestes
- Species: M. nubigens

Binomial name
- Mimosestes nubigens (Motschulsky, 1874)

Species of beetle

Mimosestes nubigens is a species of leaf beetle in the family Chrysomelidae. It is found in Central America, North America, Oceania, South America, and Southern Asia.
