= Sennius discolor =

Scientific classification
- Kingdom: Animalia
- Phylum: Arthropoda
- Class: Insecta
- Order: Coleoptera
- Suborder: Polyphaga
- Infraorder: Cucujiformia
- Family: Chrysomelidae
- Genus: Sennius
- Species: S. discolor

Binomial name
- Sennius discolor (Horn, 1873)

Species of beetle

Sennius discolor is a species of leaf beetle in the family Chrysomelidae. It is found in Central America and North America.
