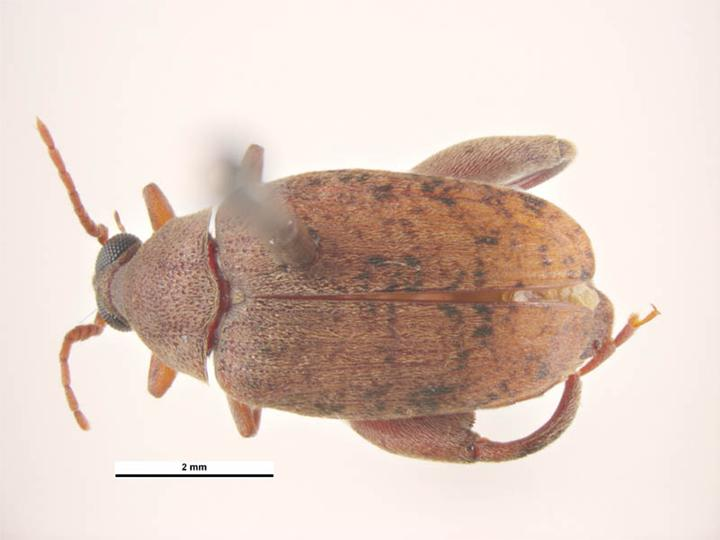
- Caryedon gonagra

Scientific classification
- Kingdom: Animalia
- Phylum: Arthropoda
- Clade: Pancrustacea
- Class: Insecta
- Order: Coleoptera
- Suborder: Polyphaga
- Infraorder: Cucujiformia
- Family: Chrysomelidae
- Subfamily: Bruchinae
- Tribe: Pachymerini
- Genus: Caryedon; Schoenherr, 1823

= Caryedon =

Genus of beetles

Caryedon is a genus of pea and bean weevils in the beetle family Chrysomelidae. There are about 11 described species in Caryedon.

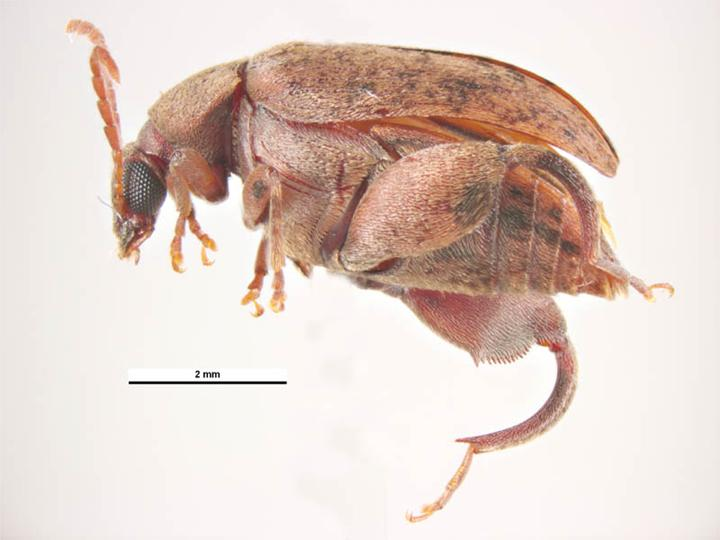
Caryedon gonagra

== Species ==
These 11 species belong to the genus Caryedon:

- Caryedon acaciae Gyllenhal, 1833
- Caryedon angeri Semenov, 1896
- Caryedon germari Kuster, 1845
- Caryedon gonagra (Fabricius, 1798)
- Caryedon kizilkumensis Ter-Minassian, 1977
- Caryedon lagonychii Motschulsky, 1873
- Caryedon lisaeae Southgate, 1971
- Caryedon mesra Johnson, Southgate & Delobel, 2004
- Caryedon prosopidis Arora, 1977
- Caryedon serratus (Olivier, 1790) (groundnut bruchid)
- Caryedon yemenensis Decelle, 1979
