= Algarobius prosopis =

Scientific classification
- Kingdom: Animalia
- Phylum: Arthropoda
- Clade: Pancrustacea
- Class: Insecta
- Order: Coleoptera
- Suborder: Polyphaga
- Infraorder: Cucujiformia
- Family: Chrysomelidae
- Genus: Algarobius
- Species: A. prosopis

Binomial name
- Algarobius prosopis (J. L. LeConte, 1858)

Species of beetle

Algarobius prosopis is a species of leaf beetle in the family Chrysomelidae. It is found in Africa, Europe & Northern Asia (excluding China), Central America, and North America.
