= Merobruchus terani =

Scientific classification
- Domain: Eukaryota
- Kingdom: Animalia
- Phylum: Arthropoda
- Class: Insecta
- Order: Coleoptera
- Suborder: Polyphaga
- Infraorder: Cucujiformia
- Family: Chrysomelidae
- Genus: Merobruchus
- Species: M. terani

Binomial name
- Merobruchus terani Kingsolver, 1980

Species of beetle

Merobruchus terani is a species of leaf beetle in the family Chrysomelidae. It is found in Central America and North America.
