= Megacerus leucospilus =

Scientific classification
- Kingdom: Animalia
- Phylum: Arthropoda
- Class: Insecta
- Order: Coleoptera
- Suborder: Polyphaga
- Infraorder: Cucujiformia
- Family: Chrysomelidae
- Genus: Megacerus
- Species: M. leucospilus

Binomial name
- Megacerus leucospilus (Sharp, 1885)

Species of beetle

Megacerus leucospilus is a species of leaf beetle in the family Chrysomelidae. It is found in Central America, North America, and Oceania.
