= Stylantheus =

Scientific classification
- Domain: Eukaryota
- Kingdom: Animalia
- Phylum: Arthropoda
- Class: Insecta
- Order: Coleoptera
- Suborder: Polyphaga
- Infraorder: Cucujiformia
- Family: Chrysomelidae
- Subfamily: Bruchinae
- Tribe: Bruchini
- Genus: Stylantheus; Bridwell, 1946

Genus of beetles

Stylantheus is a genus of pea and bean weevils in the beetle family Chrysomelidae. There is one described species in Stylantheus, S. macrocerus.
