= Sennius leucostauros =

Scientific classification
- Kingdom: Animalia
- Phylum: Arthropoda
- Class: Insecta
- Order: Coleoptera
- Suborder: Polyphaga
- Infraorder: Cucujiformia
- Family: Chrysomelidae
- Genus: Sennius
- Species: S. leucostauros

Binomial name
- Sennius leucostauros Johnson & Kingsolver, 1973

Species of beetle

Sennius leucostauros is a species of leaf beetle in the family Chrysomelidae. It is found in Central America and North America.
