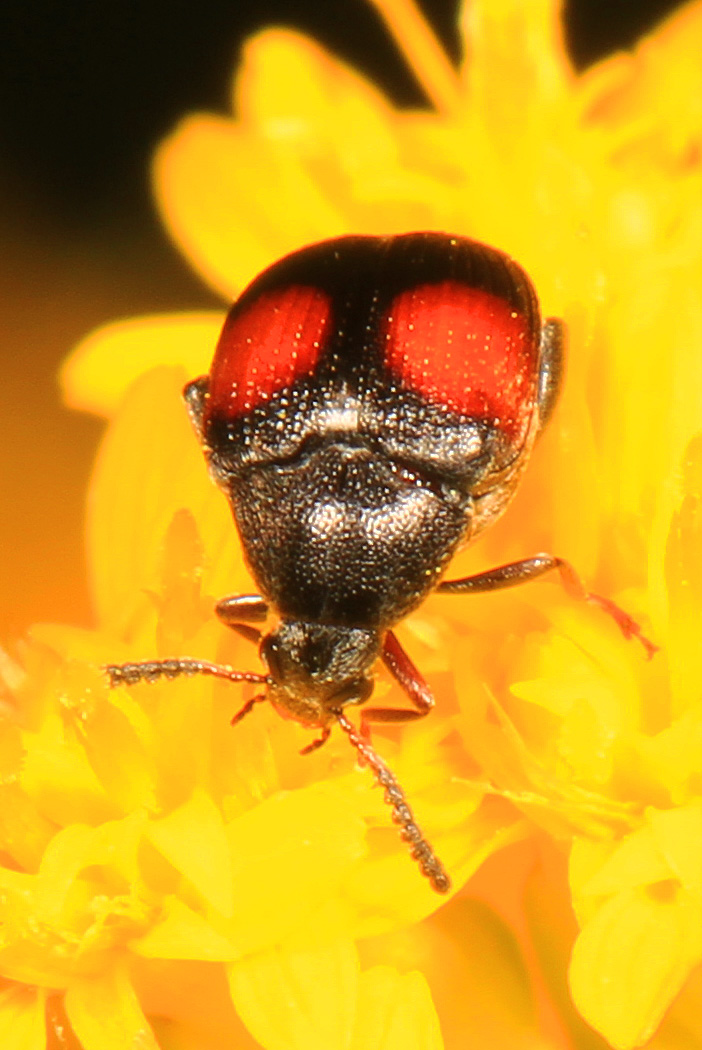

Scientific classification
- Kingdom: Animalia
- Phylum: Arthropoda
- Class: Insecta
- Order: Coleoptera
- Suborder: Polyphaga
- Infraorder: Cucujiformia
- Family: Chrysomelidae
- Genus: Sennius
- Species: S. abbreviatus

Binomial name
- Sennius abbreviatus (Say, 1824)

= Sennius abbreviatus =

Species of beetle

Sennius abbreviatus is a species of leaf beetle in the family Chrysomelidae. It is found in North America.
