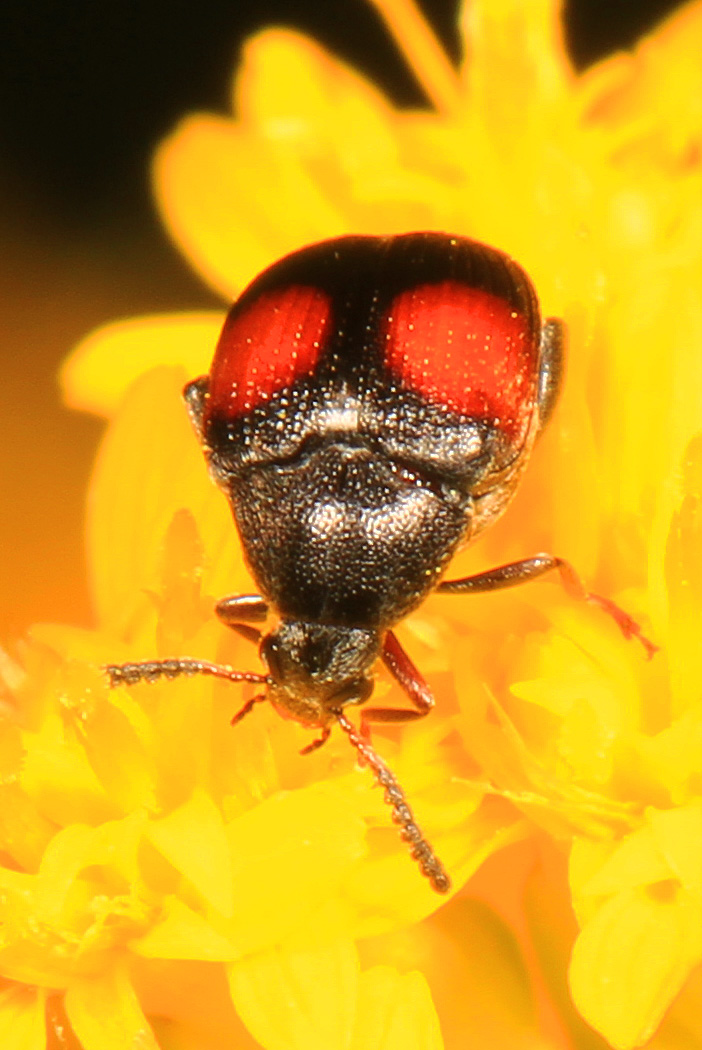
- Sennius abbreviatus

Scientific classification
- Kingdom: Animalia
- Phylum: Arthropoda
- Class: Insecta
- Order: Coleoptera
- Suborder: Polyphaga
- Infraorder: Cucujiformia
- Family: Chrysomelidae
- Subfamily: Bruchinae
- Tribe: Bruchini
- Genus: Sennius; Bridwell, 1946

= Sennius =

Genus of beetles

Sennius is a genus of pea and bean weevils in the family Chrysomelidae. There are at least 20 described species in Sennius.

== Species ==
These 28 species belong to the genus Sennius:

- Sennius abbreviatus (Say, 1824)^{i c g b}
- Sennius batesii Jekel, 1855^{g}
- Sennius bondari Pic^{g}
- Sennius bruneus Silva, Ribeiro-Costa & Johnson, 2003^{g}
- Sennius crudelis Ribeiro-Costa & Reynaud^{g}
- Sennius cruentatus (Horn, 1873)^{i c g b}
- Sennius discolor (Horn, 1873)^{i c g b}
- Sennius falcatus Kingsolver & Ribeiro-Costa, 2001^{g}
- Sennius fallax (Boheman, 1839)^{i c g}
- Sennius flinte^{g}
- Sennius guttifer (Sharp, 1885)^{b}
- Sennius kingsolveri Silva, Ribeiro-Costa & Johnson, 2003^{g}
- Sennius lawrencei Johnson, 1977^{g}
- Sennius lebasi (Fahraeus, 1839)^{i c g b}
- Sennius leptophyllicola Ribeiro-Costa^{g}
- Sennius leucostauros Johnson & Kingsolver, 1973^{i c g b}
- Sennius lojaensis Pic, 1933^{g}
- Sennius maculatus Silva, Ribeiro-Costa & Johnson, 2003^{g}
- Sennius medialis (Sharp, 1885)^{i c g}
- Sennius morosus (Sharp, 1885)^{i c g b}
- Sennius nappi Ribeiro-Costa & Reynaud^{g}
- Sennius niger Silva, Ribeiro-Costa & Johnson, 2003^{g}
- Sennius obesulus (Sharp, 1885)^{i c g}
- Sennius rufomaculatus (Motschulsky, 1874)^{g}
- Sennius simulans (Schaeffer, 1907)^{i c}
- Sennius ventralis Fahraeus, 1839^{g}
- Sennius vivi^{g}
- Sennius whitei Johnson and Kingsolver, 1973^{i c g}

Data sources: i = ITIS, c = Catalogue of Life, g = GBIF, b = Bugguide.net
