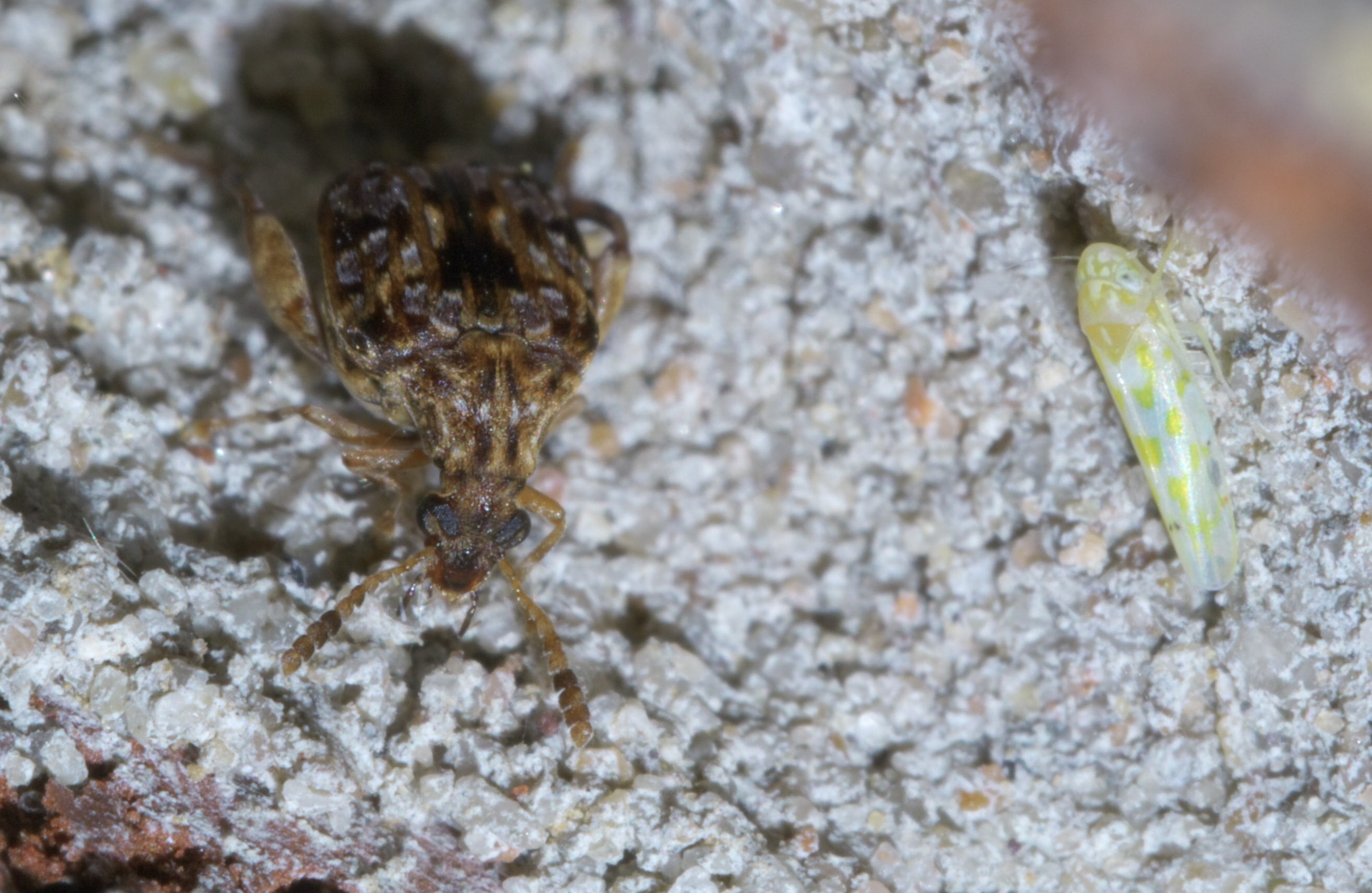
- Gibbobruchus mimus

Scientific classification
- Kingdom: Animalia
- Phylum: Arthropoda
- Class: Insecta
- Order: Coleoptera
- Suborder: Polyphaga
- Infraorder: Cucujiformia
- Family: Chrysomelidae
- Subfamily: Bruchinae
- Tribe: Bruchini
- Genus: Gibbobruchus; Pic, 1913

= Gibbobruchus =

Genus of beetles

Gibbobruchus is a genus of pea and bean weevils in the family Chrysomelidae. There are about seven described species in Gibbobruchus.

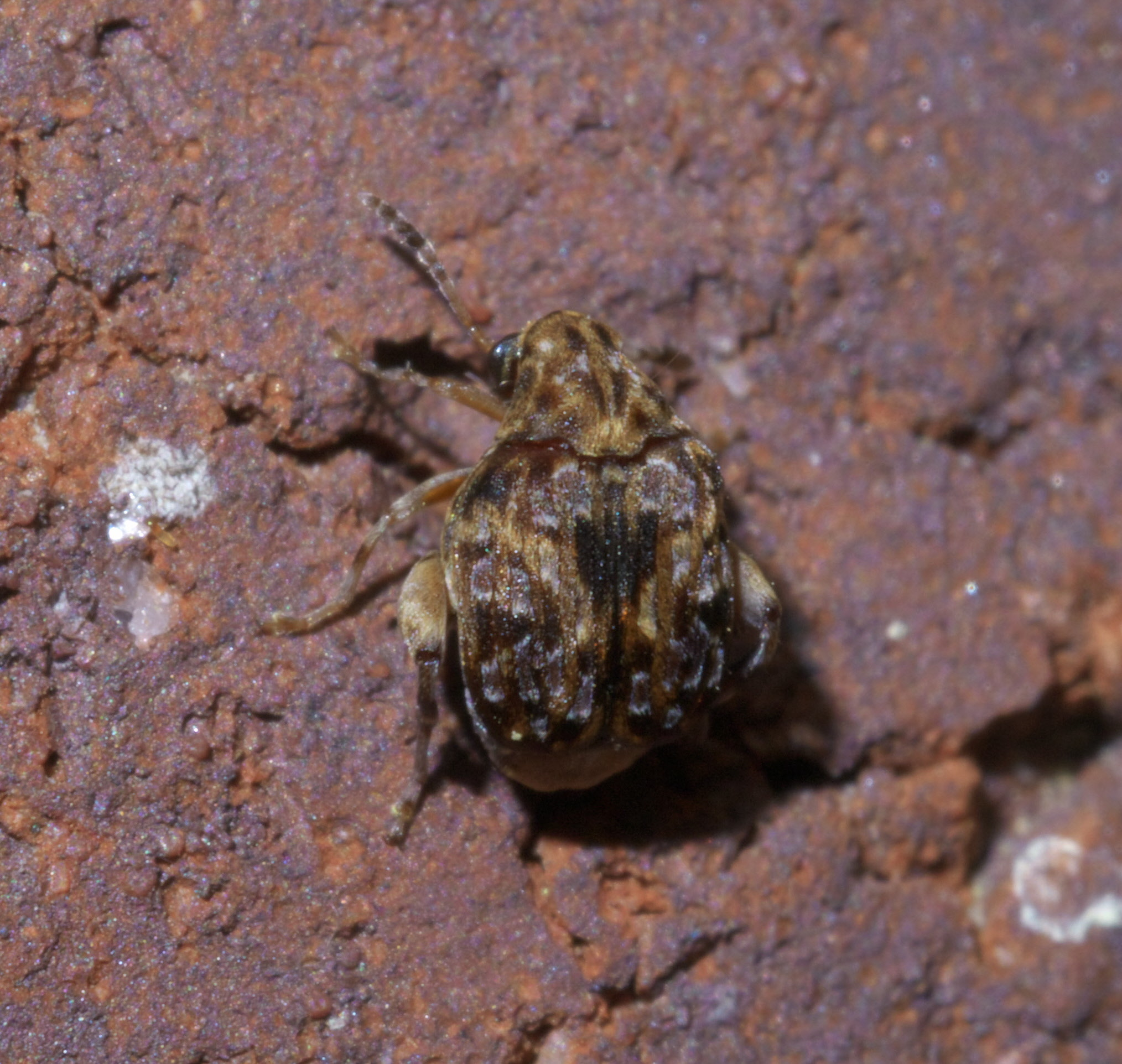
Gibbobruchus mimus

== Species ==
These seven species belong to the genus Gibbobruchus:

- Gibbobruchus bergamini Manfio & Ribeiro-Costa, 2014^{g}
- Gibbobruchus cavillator Fahraeus, 1839^{g}
- Gibbobruchus cristicollis (Sharp, 1885)^{i c g}
- Gibbobruchus divaricatae Whitehead and Kingsolver, 1975^{i c g}
- Gibbobruchus mimus (Say, 1831)^{i c g b} (redbud bruchid)
- Gibbobruchus polycoccus Fahraeus, 1839^{g}
- Gibbobruchus scurra Boheman, 1833^{g}

Data sources: i = ITIS, c = Catalogue of Life, g = GBIF, b = Bugguide.net
