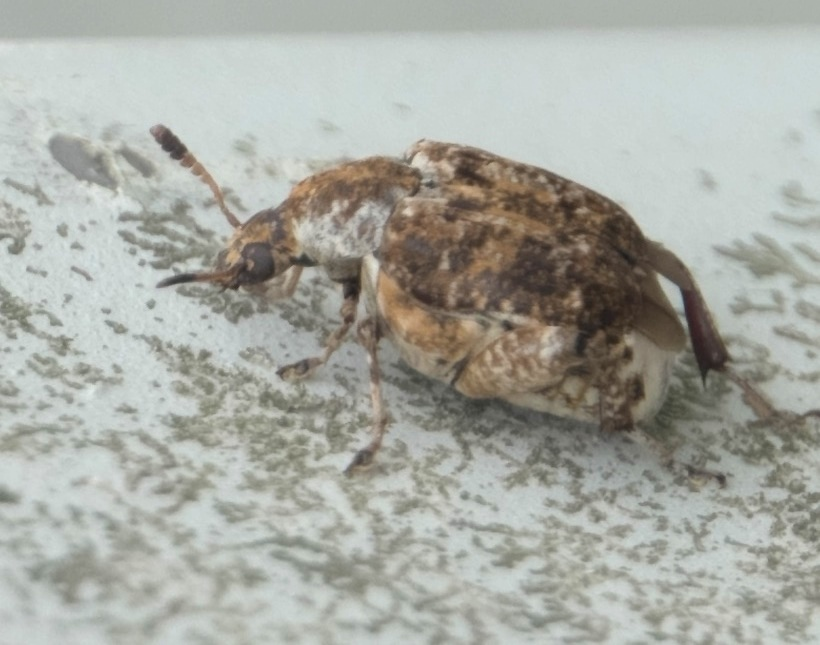
- Merobruchus major, Texas

Scientific classification
- Domain: Eukaryota
- Kingdom: Animalia
- Phylum: Arthropoda
- Class: Insecta
- Order: Coleoptera
- Suborder: Polyphaga
- Infraorder: Cucujiformia
- Family: Chrysomelidae
- Genus: Merobruchus
- Species: M. major

Binomial name
- Merobruchus major (Fall, 1912)

= Merobruchus major =

Species of beetle

Merobruchus major, known generally as the Texas ebony bruchid or Texas ebony bean weevil, is a species of leaf beetle in the family Chrysomelidae. It is found in Central America and North America.
