= Meibomeus =

Scientific classification
- Domain: Eukaryota
- Kingdom: Animalia
- Phylum: Arthropoda
- Class: Insecta
- Order: Coleoptera
- Suborder: Polyphaga
- Infraorder: Cucujiformia
- Family: Chrysomelidae
- Subfamily: Bruchinae
- Tribe: Bruchini
- Genus: Meibomeus; Bridwell, 1946

Genus of beetles

Meibomeus is a genus of pea and bean weevils in the beetle family Chrysomelidae. There are about 12 described species in Meibomeus.

== Species ==
These 12 species belong to the genus Meibomeus:

- Meibomeus desmoportheus Kingsolver & Whitehead, 1976
- Meibomeus dirli Romero & Johnson
- Meibomeus jacki Romero & Johnson
- Meibomeus juarez Romero & Johnson
- Meibomeus kirki Romero & Johnson
- Meibomeus minimus Silva & Ribeiro-Costa, 2001
- Meibomeus musculus (Say, 1831)
- Meibomeus petrolinae Silva & Ribeiro-Costa, 2001
- Meibomeus rodneyi Romero & Johnson
- Meibomeus spinifer Silva & Ribeiro-Costa, 2001
- Meibomeus sulinus Silva & Ribeiro-Costa, 2001
- Meibomeus surrubresus (Pic, 1933)
