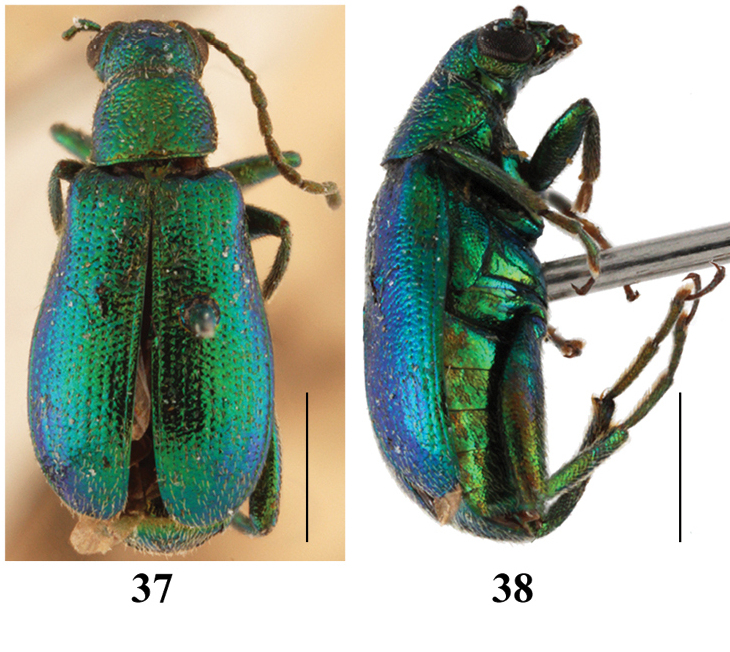
- Rhaebus solskyi

Scientific classification
- Kingdom: Animalia
- Phylum: Arthropoda
- Class: Insecta
- Order: Coleoptera
- Suborder: Polyphaga
- Infraorder: Cucujiformia
- Family: Chrysomelidae
- Subfamily: Bruchinae
- Tribe: Rhaebini; Blanchard, 1845
- Genus: Rhaebus; Fischer von Waldheim, 1824

Type species
- Rhaebus gebleri Fischer von Waldheim, 1824

= Rhaebus (beetle) =

Genus of seed beetles

Rhaebus (from the Greek: ῥαιβός curved) is a genus of metallic bean weevils in the subfamily Bruchinae, and the only member of the tribe Rhaebini. It is restricted to the Palearctic region.

== Appearance ==
Rhaebus beetles are small, measuring between 3–5 millimetres in length, and are metallic in colour, which is rare in members of the Bruchinae subfamily. Their bodies are elongated in shape, and the antennae vary.

== Diet and life cycle ==
Rhaebus beetles feed exclusively on plants of the genus Nitraria, where their young also develop.

== Taxonomic history ==
The genus was first described in 1824 by Gotthelf Fischer von Waldheim in his book Entomographie de la Russie. He described it with only one species, Rh. gebleri, making the genus monotypic.

=== Species creation & synonymy ===
- 1845: Rhaebus fischeri mentioned by Jean T. Lacordaire, not described.
- 1845: Rhaebus mannerheimi named and described by Victor Motschulsky.
- 1866: Rhaebus sagroides named and described by Simon Martinovitch Solsky.
- 1867: Rhaebus beckeri named and described by Christian W. L. E. Suffrain. The original description (in German) is available from Wikimedia Commons.
- 1869: Rh. beckeri and Rh. sagroides synonymized with Rh. mannerheimi by Victor Motchulsky.
- 1879: Rhaebus solskyi proposed by Ernst Gustav Kraatz.
- 1939: Rhaebus komarovi named and described by Fyodor Lukyanovich.
- 1973: Rhaebus lukjanovitschi named and described by Margarita Ervandovna Ter-Minassian.
- 2000: Rhaebus amnoni named and described by Igor Lopatin and Vladimir Chikatunov, after Dr. Amnon Freidberg.
- 2022: Rh. amnoni, Rh. komarovi, and Rh. mannerheimi synonymized with Rh. gebleri by Andrei Legalov.

== Species ==
Since a taxonomic review in August 2022, Rhaebus has three species:

- Rhaebus gebleri Fischer von Waldheim, 1824 (Rh. mannerheimi, Rh. amnoni, Rh. komarovi) – Found in China, Iran, Israel, Kazakhstan, Mongolia, Russia and Turkey.
- Rhaebus lukjanovitschi Ter-Minassian, 1973 – Found in China and Mongolia.
- Rhaebus solskyi Kraatz, 1879 – Found in China, Kazakhstan, Kyrgyzstan, Mongolia, Russia and Turkmenistan.
