= Neltumius arizonensis =

Scientific classification
- Domain: Eukaryota
- Kingdom: Animalia
- Phylum: Arthropoda
- Class: Insecta
- Order: Coleoptera
- Suborder: Polyphaga
- Infraorder: Cucujiformia
- Family: Chrysomelidae
- Genus: Neltumius
- Species: N. arizonensis

Binomial name
- Neltumius arizonensis (Schaeffer, 1904)

Species of beetle

Neltumius arizonensis is a species of leaf beetle in the family Chrysomelidae. It is found in Central America and North America.
