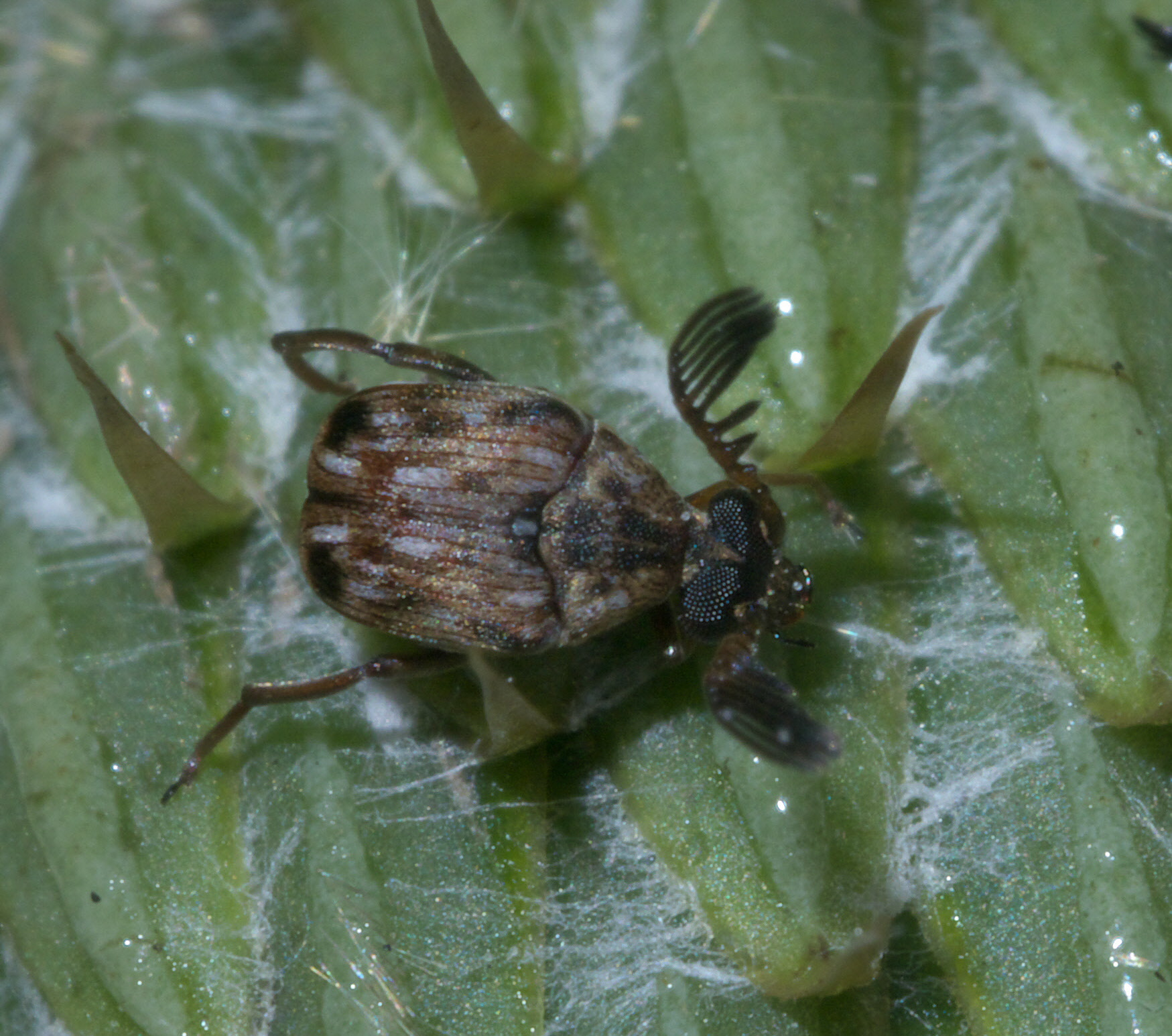
- Megacerus cubiculus

Scientific classification
- Kingdom: Animalia
- Phylum: Arthropoda
- Class: Insecta
- Order: Coleoptera
- Suborder: Polyphaga
- Infraorder: Cucujiformia
- Family: Chrysomelidae
- Subfamily: Bruchinae
- Tribe: Bruchini
- Genus: Megacerus; Fåhraeus, 1839

= Megacerus =

Genus of beetles

Megacerus is a genus of large-horned bruchines in the family Chrysomelidae. There are about 9 described species in Megacerus in North America.

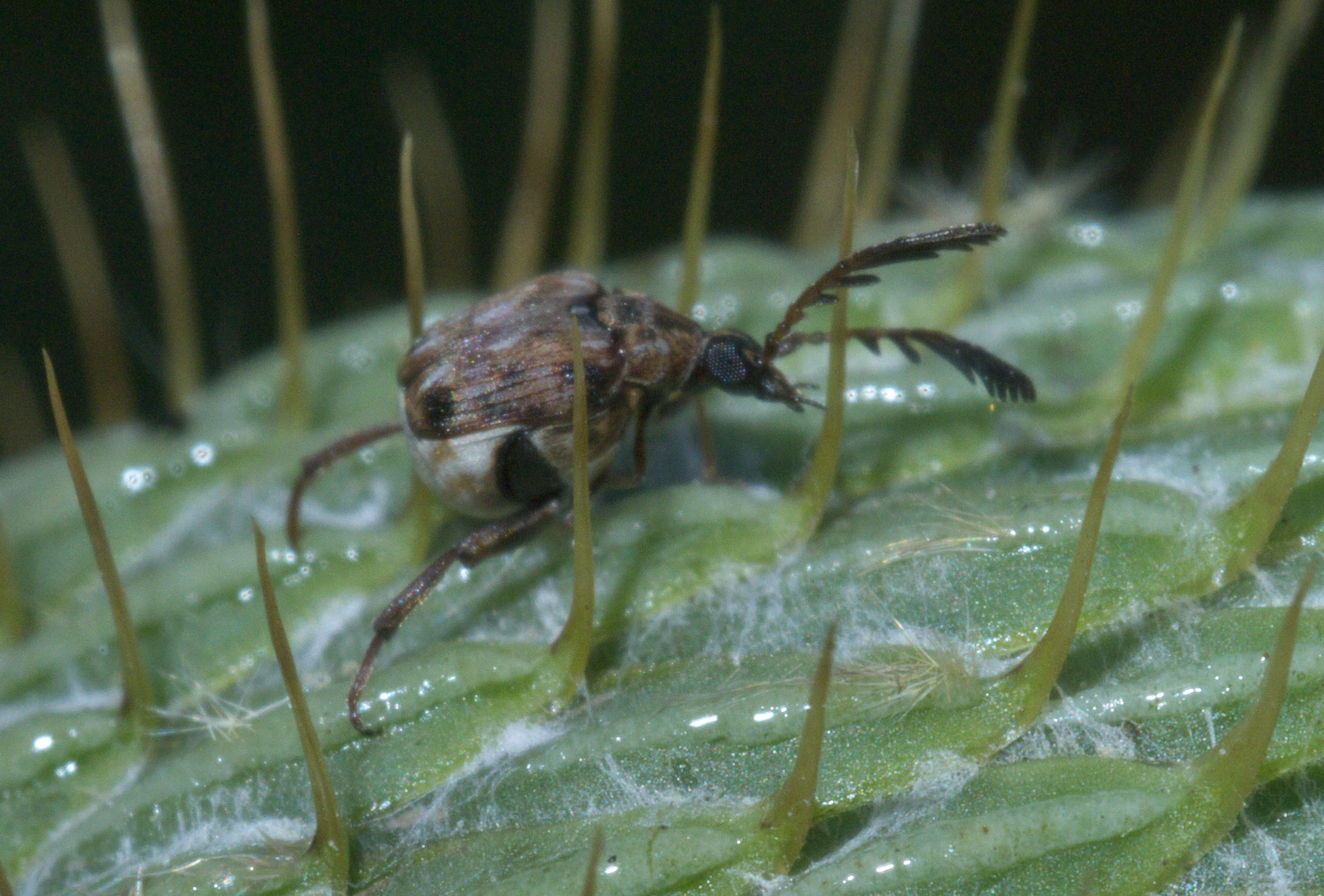
Megacerus cubiculus

== North American Species ==
- Megacerus coryphae (Olivier, 1795)
- Megacerus cubiculus (Casey, 1884)
- Megacerus cubicus (Motschulsky, 1874)
- Megacerus discoidus (Say, 1824)
- Megacerus impiger (Horn, 1873)
- Megacerus leucospilus (Sharp, 1885)
- Megacerus maculiventris (Fahraeus, 1839)
- Megacerus ripiphorus (Fahraeus, 1839)
- Megacerus schaefferianus Bridwell, 1929
