= Sennius lebasi =

Scientific classification
- Kingdom: Animalia
- Phylum: Arthropoda
- Clade: Pancrustacea
- Class: Insecta
- Order: Coleoptera
- Suborder: Polyphaga
- Infraorder: Cucujiformia
- Family: Chrysomelidae
- Genus: Sennius
- Species: S. lebasi

Binomial name
- Sennius lebasi (Fahraeus, 1839)

Species of beetle

Sennius lebasi is a species of pea or bean weevil in the family Chrysomelidae. It is found in the Caribbean, Central America, North America, and South America.
