= Mimosestes ulkei =

Scientific classification
- Kingdom: Animalia
- Phylum: Arthropoda
- Class: Insecta
- Order: Coleoptera
- Suborder: Polyphaga
- Infraorder: Cucujiformia
- Family: Chrysomelidae
- Genus: Mimosestes
- Species: M. ulkei

Binomial name
- Mimosestes ulkei (Horn, 1873)

Species of beetle

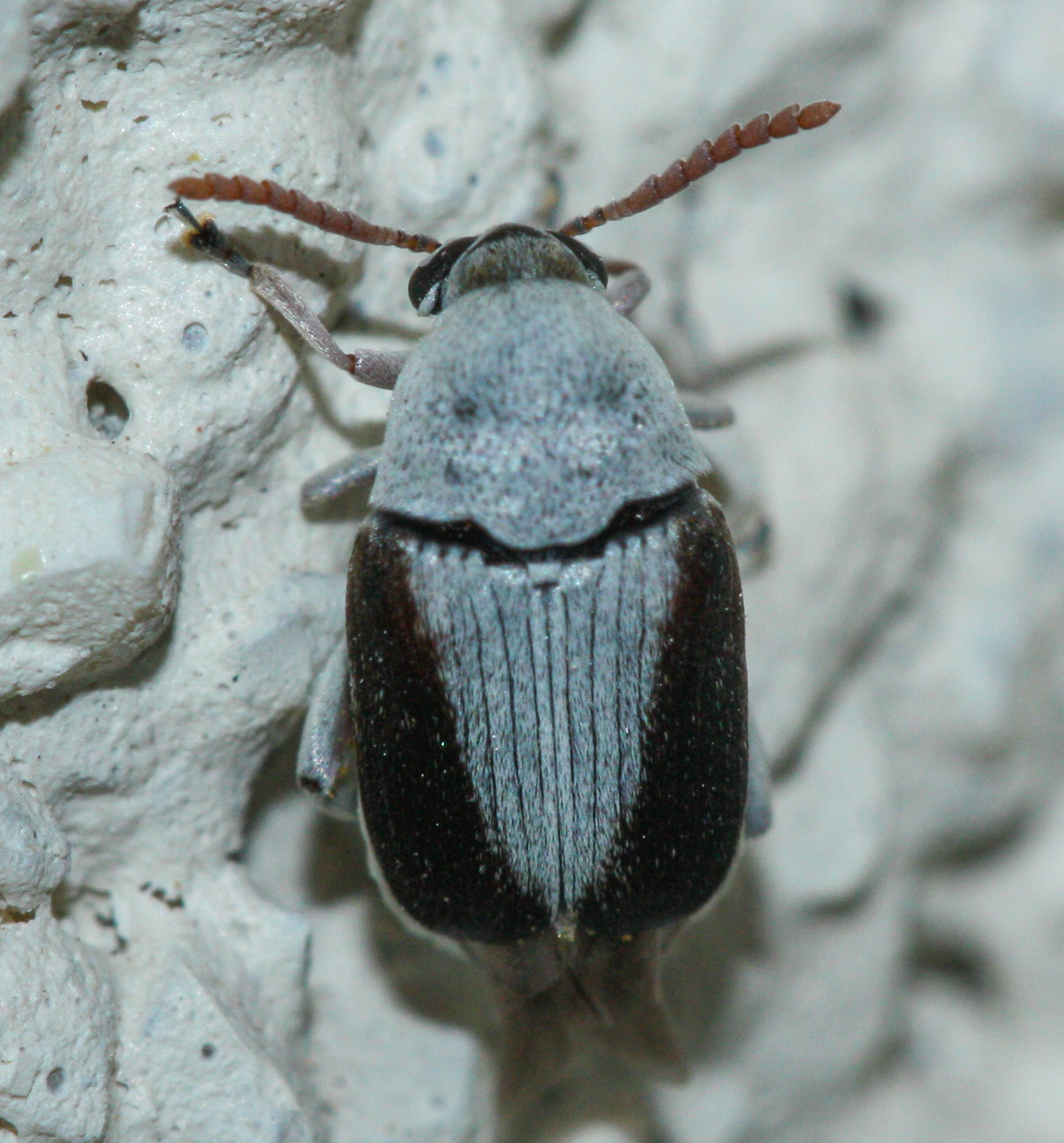
Mimosestes ulkei

Mimosestes ulkei, the retama weevil, is a species of leaf beetle in the family Chrysomelidae. It is found in Central America and North America.
