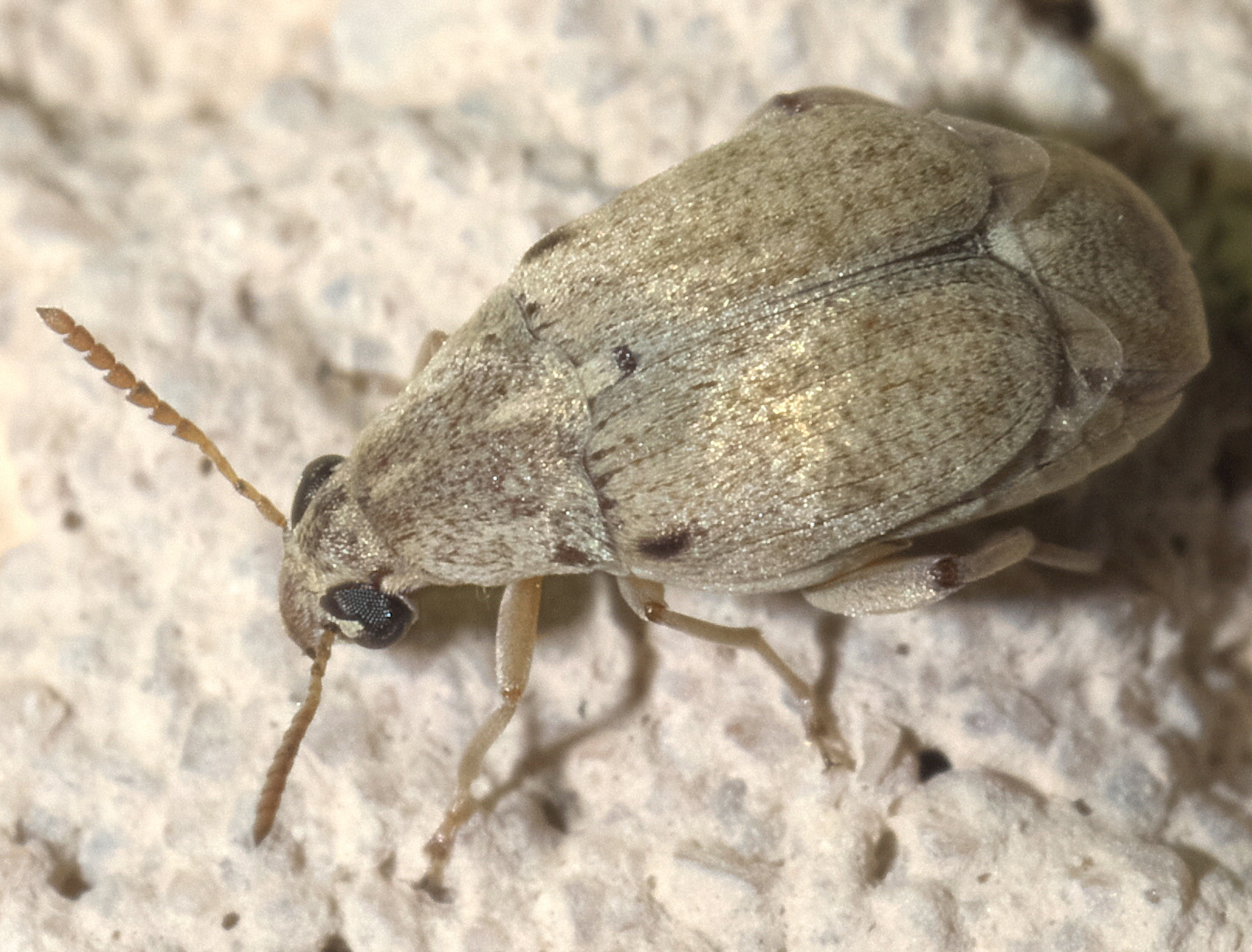

Scientific classification
- Domain: Eukaryota
- Kingdom: Animalia
- Phylum: Arthropoda
- Class: Insecta
- Order: Coleoptera
- Suborder: Polyphaga
- Infraorder: Cucujiformia
- Family: Chrysomelidae
- Subfamily: Bruchinae
- Tribe: Bruchini
- Genus: Algarobius; Bridwell, 1946

= Algarobius =

Genus of beetles

Algarobius is a genus of pea and bean weevils in the beetle family Chrysomelidae. There are about six described species in Algarobius.

== Species ==
These six species belong to the genus Algarobius:

- Algarobius atratus Kingsolver
- Algarobius bottimeri Kingsolver, 1972 (kiawe bean weevil)
- Algarobius johnsoni Kingsolver
- Algarobius nicoya Kingsolver
- Algarobius prosopis (J. L. LeConte, 1858)
- Algarobius riochama Kingsolver
