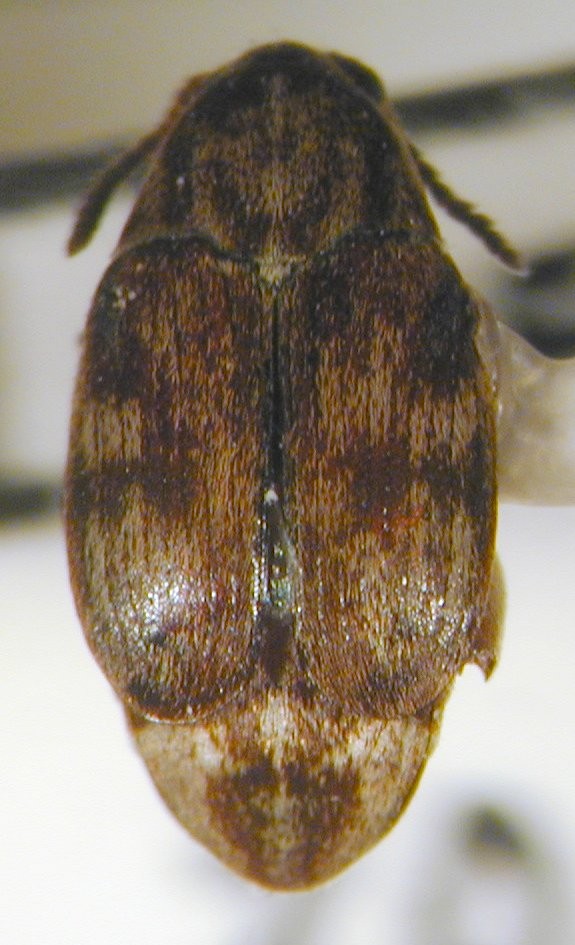

Scientific classification
- Kingdom: Animalia
- Phylum: Arthropoda
- Class: Insecta
- Order: Coleoptera
- Suborder: Polyphaga
- Infraorder: Cucujiformia
- Family: Chrysomelidae
- Genus: Algarobius
- Species: A. bottimeri

Binomial name
- Algarobius bottimeri Kingsolver, 1972

= Algarobius bottimeri =

Species of beetle

Algarobius bottimeri, known generally as the kiawe bean weevil or Bottimer's Texas bruchid, is a species of leaf beetle in the family Chrysomelidae. It is found in Central America, North America, and Oceania.
