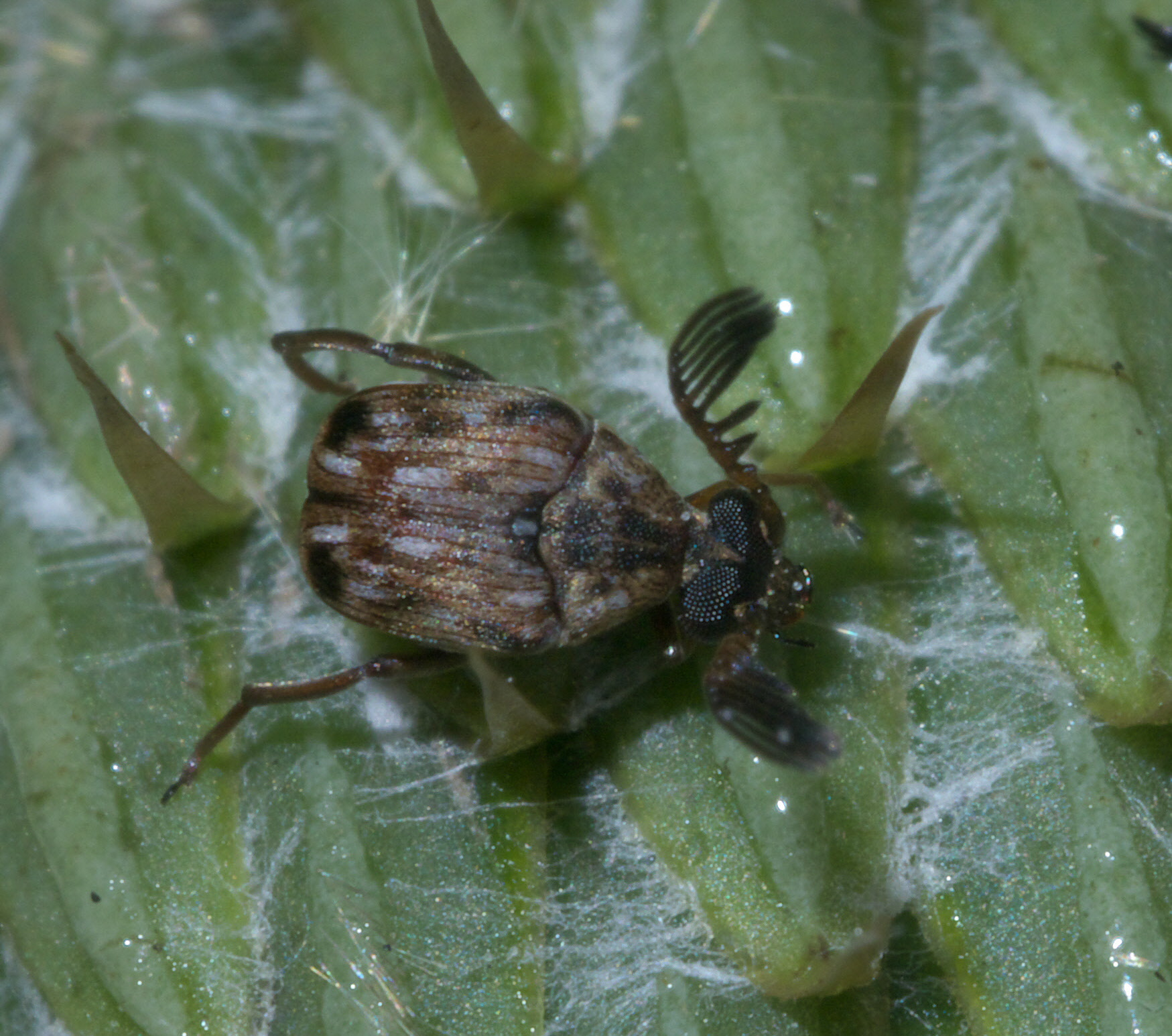

Scientific classification
- Kingdom: Animalia
- Phylum: Arthropoda
- Class: Insecta
- Order: Coleoptera
- Suborder: Polyphaga
- Infraorder: Cucujiformia
- Family: Chrysomelidae
- Genus: Megacerus
- Species: M. cubiculus

Binomial name
- Megacerus cubiculus (Casey, 1884)

= Megacerus cubiculus =

Species of beetle

Megacerus cubiculus is a species of leaf beetle in the family Chrysomelidae. It is found in Central America and North America.

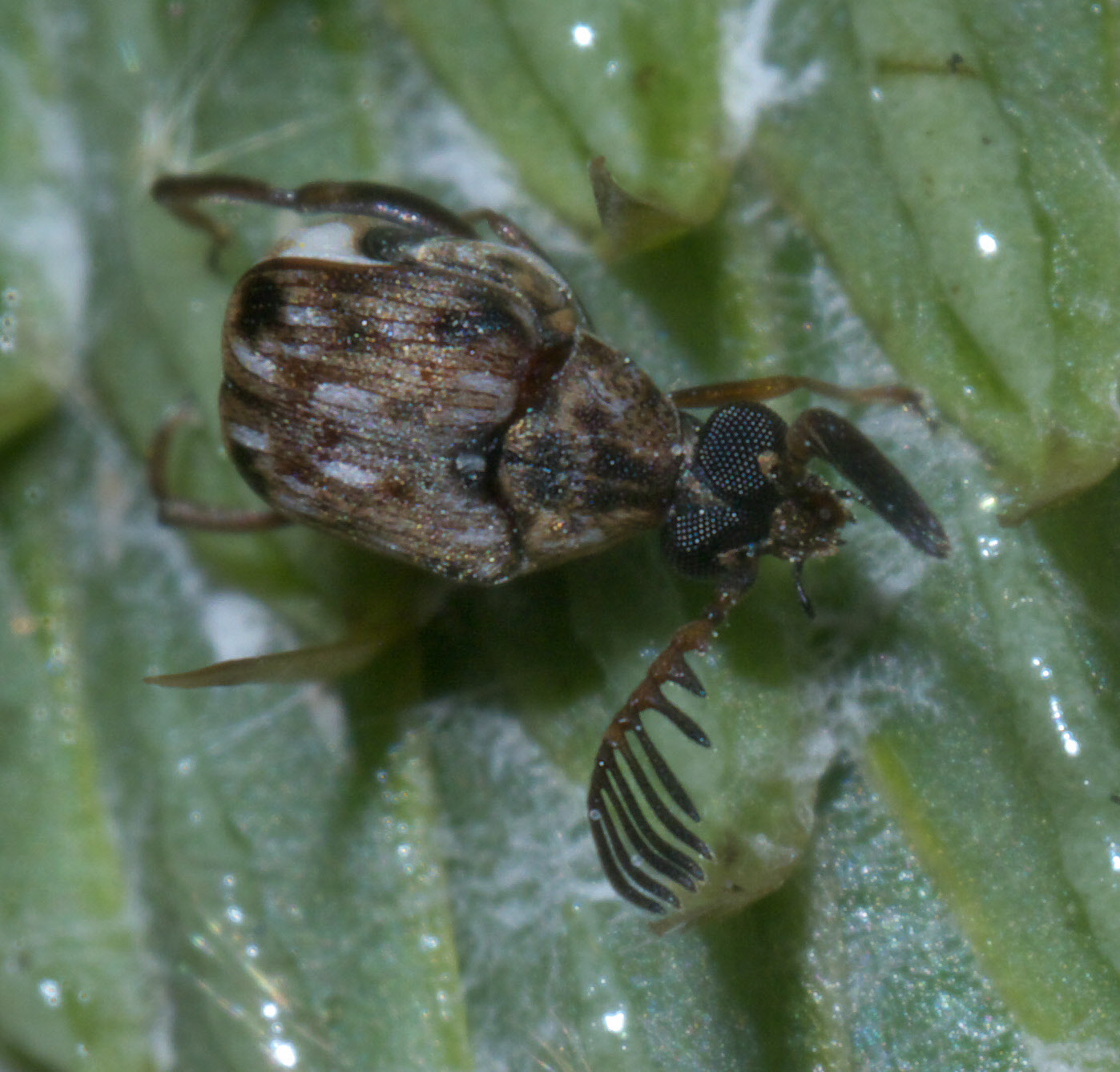

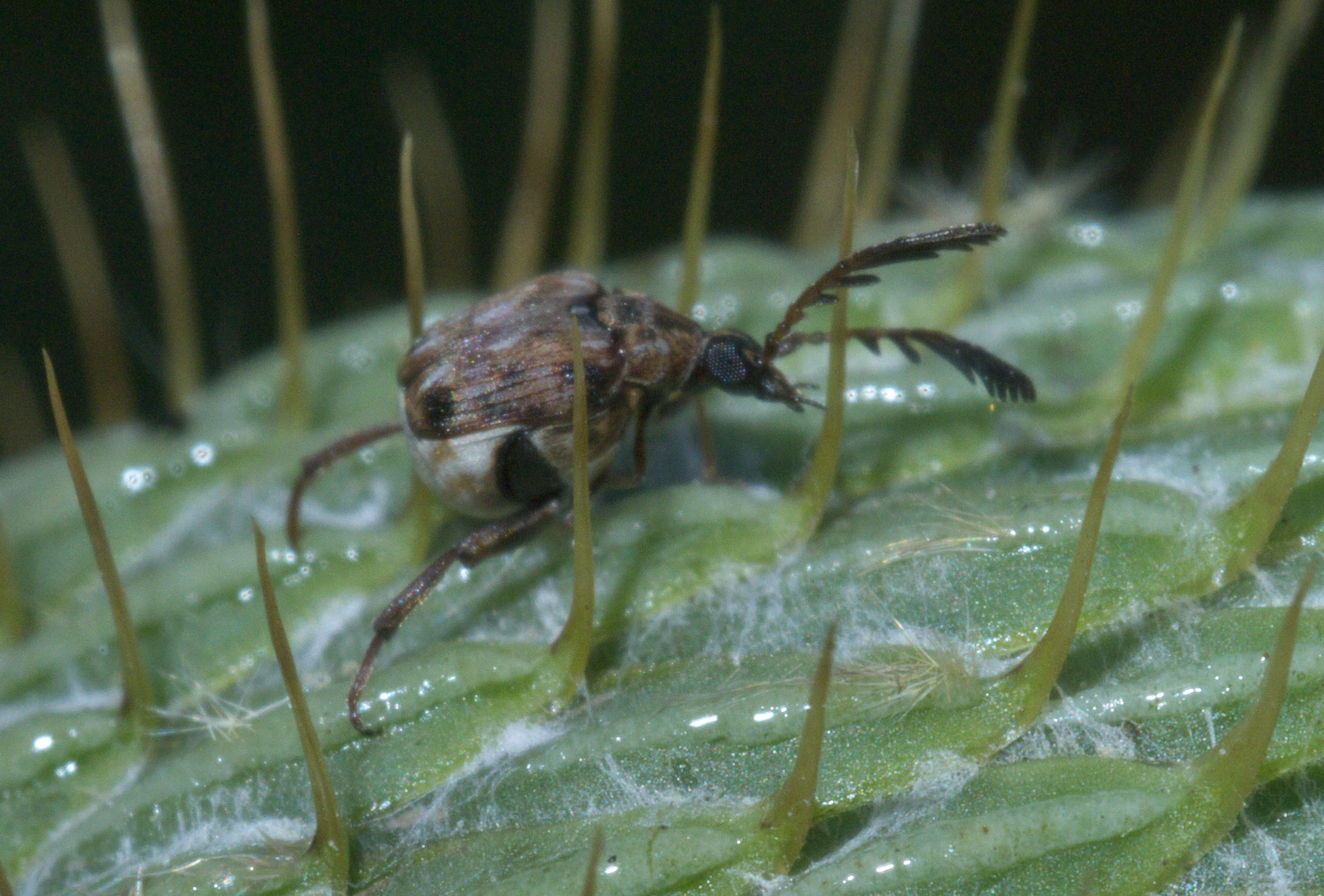
