= Megacerus coryphae =

Scientific classification
- Kingdom: Animalia
- Phylum: Arthropoda
- Clade: Pancrustacea
- Class: Insecta
- Order: Coleoptera
- Suborder: Polyphaga
- Infraorder: Cucujiformia
- Family: Chrysomelidae
- Genus: Megacerus
- Species: M. coryphae

Binomial name
- Megacerus coryphae (Olivier, 1795)

Species of beetle

Megacerus coryphae is a species of leaf beetle in the family Chrysomelidae. It is found in North America.
