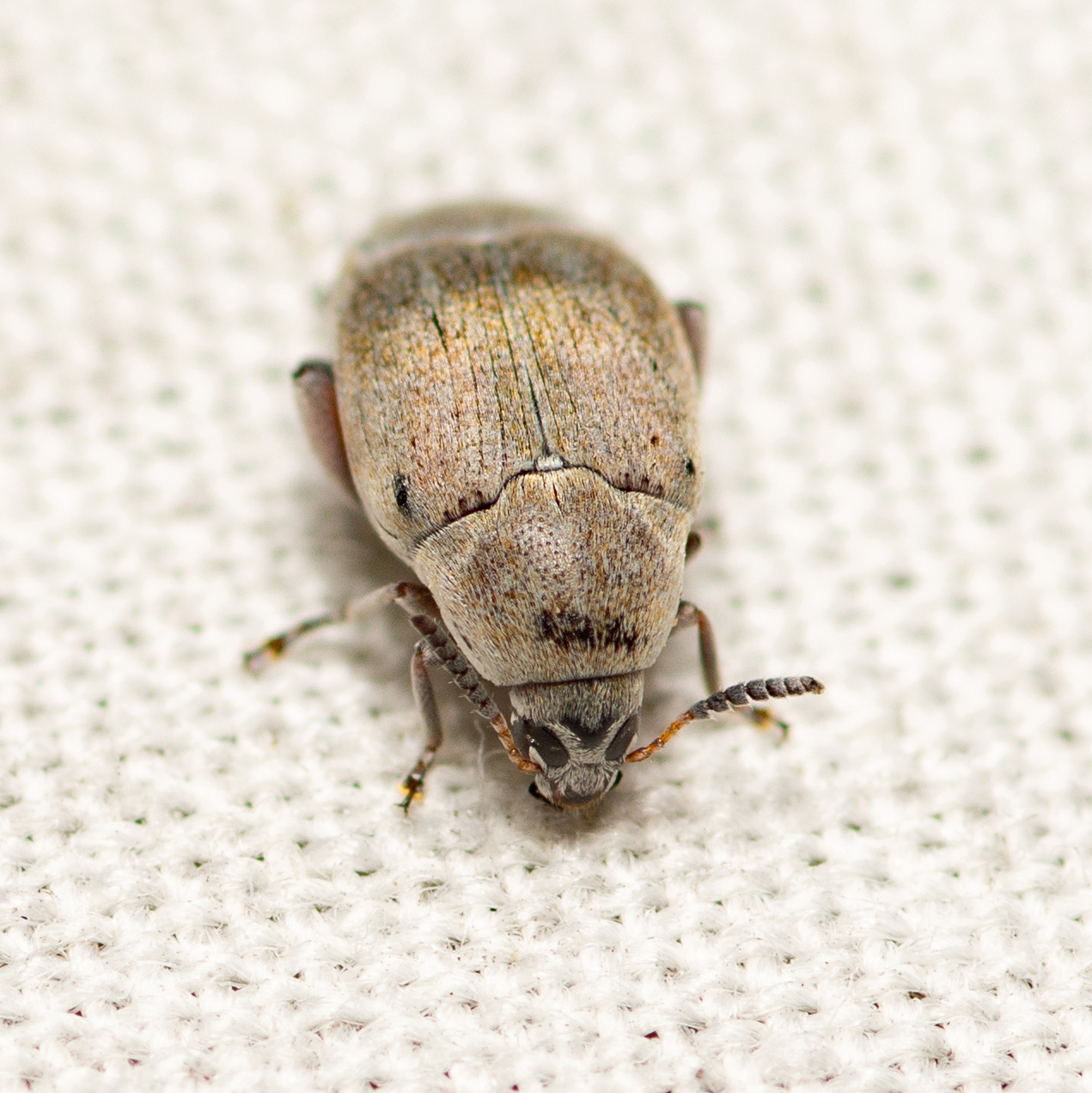
- Mimosestes amicus

Scientific classification
- Kingdom: Animalia
- Phylum: Arthropoda
- Class: Insecta
- Order: Coleoptera
- Suborder: Polyphaga
- Infraorder: Cucujiformia
- Family: Chrysomelidae
- Subfamily: Bruchinae
- Tribe: Bruchini
- Genus: Mimosestes; Bridwell, 1946

= Mimosestes =

Genus of beetles

Mimosestes is a genus of pea and bean weevils in the beetle family Chrysomelidae. There are about 13 described species in Mimosestes.

== Species ==
At least these 12 species belong to the genus Mimosestes:

- Mimosestes acaciestes Kingsolver & Johnson, 1978
- Mimosestes amicus (Horn, 1873)
- Mimosestes anomalus Johnson
- Mimosestes chrysocosmus Kingsolver, 1985
- Mimosestes enterolobii Johnson
- Mimosestes insularis Kingsolver & Johnson, 1978
- Mimosestes janzeni Johnson
- Mimosestes mimosae (Fabricius, 1781)
- Mimosestes nubigens (Motschulsky, 1874)
- Mimosestes playazul Johnson
- Mimosestes protractus (Horn, 1873)
- Mimosestes ulkei (Horn, 1873) (retama weevil)
