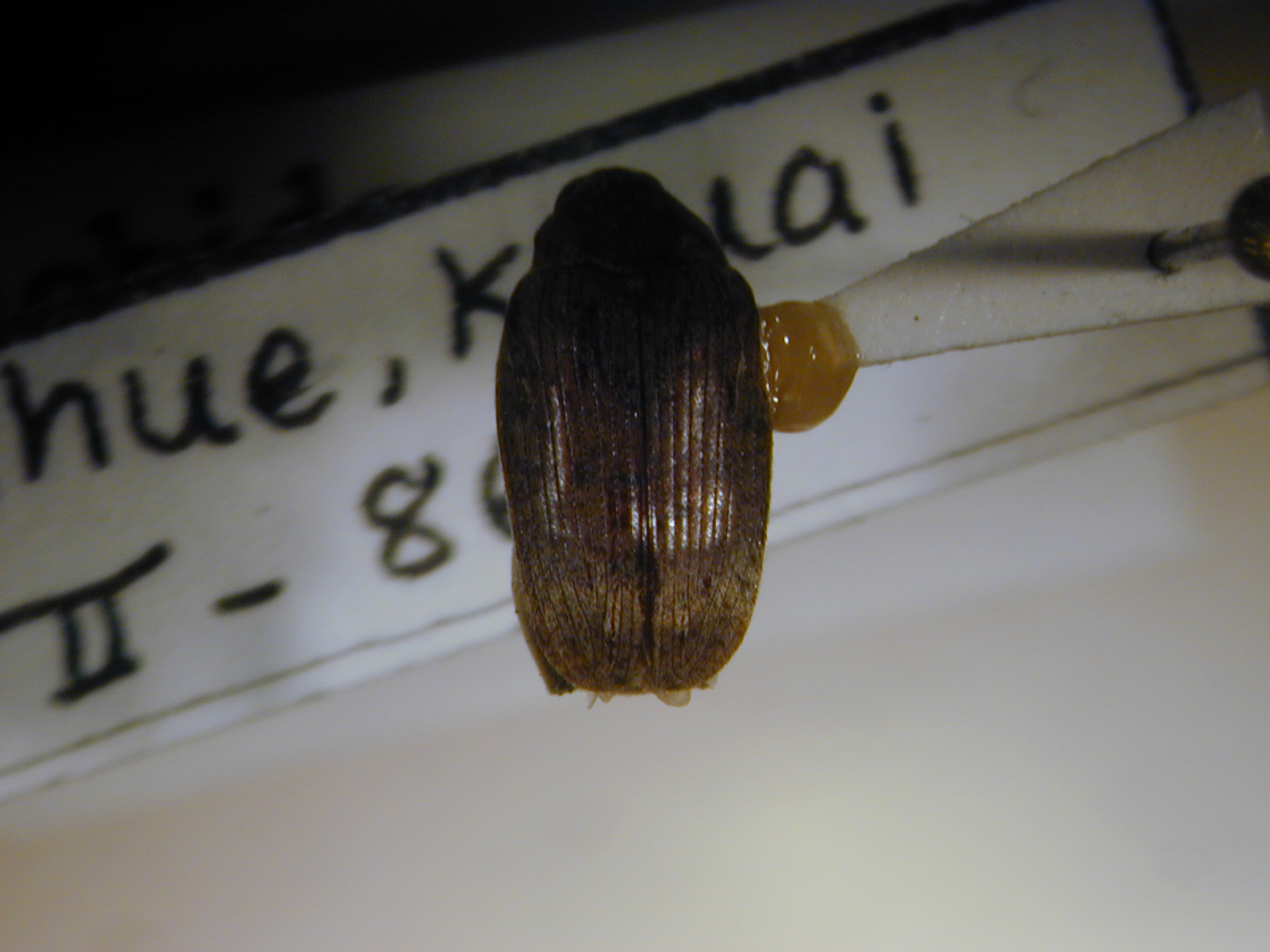

Scientific classification
- Kingdom: Animalia
- Phylum: Arthropoda
- Clade: Pancrustacea
- Class: Insecta
- Order: Coleoptera
- Suborder: Polyphaga
- Infraorder: Cucujiformia
- Family: Chrysomelidae
- Genus: Caryedon
- Species: C. serratus

Binomial name
- Caryedon serratus (Olivier, 1790)

= Caryedon serratus =

Species of beetle

Caryedon serratus, known generally as the groundnut bruchid or groundnut borer, is a species of leaf beetle in the family Chrysomelidae. It is found in Africa, the Caribbean, Europe and Northern Asia (excluding China), Central America, North America, Oceania, and South America.
