= Mimosestes acaciestes =

Scientific classification
- Kingdom: Animalia
- Phylum: Arthropoda
- Class: Insecta
- Order: Coleoptera
- Suborder: Polyphaga
- Infraorder: Cucujiformia
- Family: Chrysomelidae
- Genus: Mimosestes
- Species: M. acaciestes

Binomial name
- Mimosestes acaciestes Kingsolver & Johnson, 1978

Species of beetle

Mimosestes acaciestes is a species of leaf beetle in the family Chrysomelidae. It is found in Central America and North America.
