= Meibomeus musculus =

Scientific classification
- Domain: Eukaryota
- Kingdom: Animalia
- Phylum: Arthropoda
- Class: Insecta
- Order: Coleoptera
- Suborder: Polyphaga
- Infraorder: Cucujiformia
- Family: Chrysomelidae
- Genus: Meibomeus
- Species: M. musculus

Binomial name
- Meibomeus musculus (Say, 1831)

Species of beetle

Meibomeus musculus is a species of leaf beetle in the family Chrysomelidae. It is found in North America.
