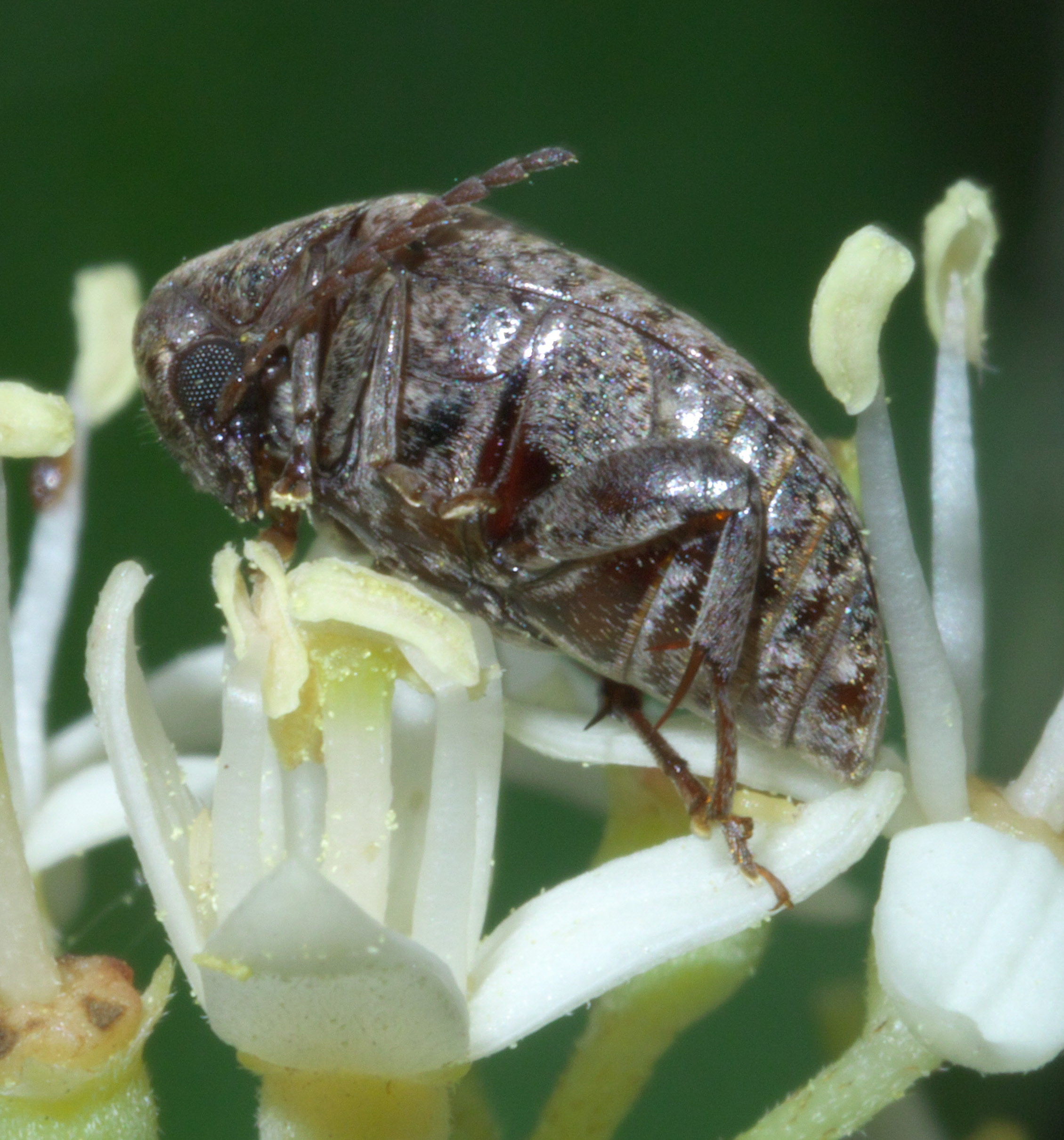
- Amblycerus robiniae

Scientific classification
- Domain: Eukaryota
- Kingdom: Animalia
- Phylum: Arthropoda
- Class: Insecta
- Order: Coleoptera
- Suborder: Polyphaga
- Infraorder: Cucujiformia
- Family: Chrysomelidae
- Subfamily: Bruchinae
- Tribe: Amblycerini
- Genus: Amblycerus; Thunberg, 1815

= Amblycerus =

Genus of beetles

Amblycerus is a genus of pea and bean weevils in the beetle family Chrysomelidae. There are more than 60 described species in Amblycerus.

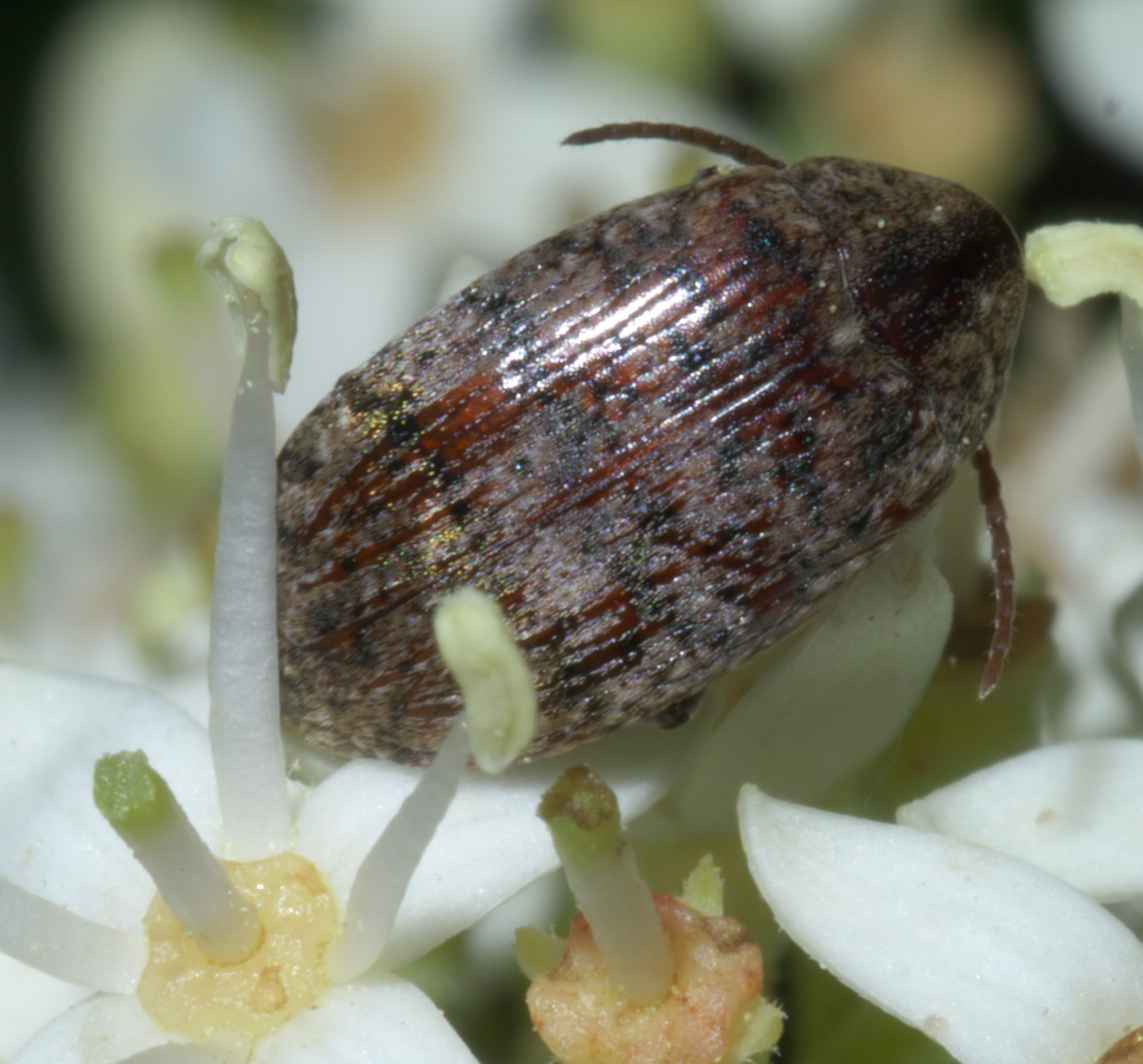
Amblycerus robiniae

== Species ==
These 63 species belong to the genus Amblycerus:

- Amblycerus acapulcensis Kingsolver
- Amblycerus atrogaster Ribeiro-Costa, 1998
- Amblycerus atypicus Ribeiro-Costa, 1999
- Amblycerus baracoensis Kingsolver
- Amblycerus bidentatus Ribeiro-Costa, 1999
- Amblycerus cerdnicola Kingsolver
- Amblycerus chapadicola Ribeiro-Costa, 1998
- Amblycerus chapini Kingsolver
- Amblycerus crassipunctatus Ribeiro-Costa, 1999
- Amblycerus cuernavace
- Amblycerus dispar (Sharp, 1885)
- Amblycerus epsilon Kingsolver
- Amblycerus eustrophoides (Schaeffer, 1904)
- Amblycerus evangelinae
- Amblycerus flavidus (Chevrolat, 1877)
- Amblycerus guazumicola Johnson & Kingsolver
- Amblycerus guerrerensis
- Amblycerus guinaeensis Thunberg, 1815
- Amblycerus imperfectus Kingsolver
- Amblycerus ireriae Romero, Johnson & Kingsolver, 1996
- Amblycerus isabelae Ribeiro-Costa, 1999
- Amblycerus isocalcaratus Ribeiro-Costa, 1999
- Amblycerus japonicus Thunberg, 1815
- Amblycerus kingsolveri Ribeiro-Costa, 1993
- Amblycerus longesuturalis (Pic, 1954)
- Amblycerus luciae Ribeiro-Costa, 1999
- Amblycerus maculicollis Ribeiro-Costa, 2000
- Amblycerus mariae
- Amblycerus marinonii Ribeiro-Costa, 1993
- Amblycerus martorelli Bridwell
- Amblycerus medialis Ribeiro-Costa, Vieira & Manfio, 2014
- Amblycerus megalobus Ribeiro-Costa, 1998
- Amblycerus mourei Ribeiro-Costa, 1998
- Amblycerus multiflocculus Kingsolver
- Amblycerus nigromarginatus (Motschulsky, 1874)
- Amblycerus obscurus (Sharp, 1885)
- Amblycerus piurae (Pierce, 1915)
- Amblycerus pollens (Sharp, 1855)
- Amblycerus profaupar Ribeiro-Costa, 2000
- Amblycerus pterocarpae Kingsolver
- Amblycerus puncticollis (Gyllenhal, 1839)
- Amblycerus pusillus Ribeiro-Costa, 2000
- Amblycerus robiniae (Fabricius, 1781)
- Amblycerus schwarzi Kingsolver, 1970
- Amblycerus sclerolobii Ribeiro-Costa, 2000
- Amblycerus scutellaris (Sharp, 1885)
- Amblycerus similaris Ribeiro-Costa, 1999
- Amblycerus similis Ribeiro-Costa, 1999
- Amblycerus sosia Ribeiro-Costa & Kingsolver, 1993
- Amblycerus spiniger Ribeiro-Costa, 2000
- Amblycerus spondiae Kingsolver
- Amblycerus stridulator Kingsolver, Romero-Napoles & Johnson, 1993
- Amblycerus tachigaliae Kingsolver
- Amblycerus teutoniensis Ribeiro-Costa & Kingsolver, 1993
- Amblycerus vega Kingsolver
- Amblycerus veracruz
- Amblycerus virens (Jekel, 1885)
- Amblycerus virescens Ribeiro-Costa, 1998
- Amblycerus viridans Ribeiro-Costa, 1998
- Amblycerus viridis Ribeiro-Costa, 1998
- Amblycerus vitis (Schaeffer, 1907)
- Amblycerus whiteheadi Kingsolver, 1991
- Amblycerus wolcotti Kingsolver
