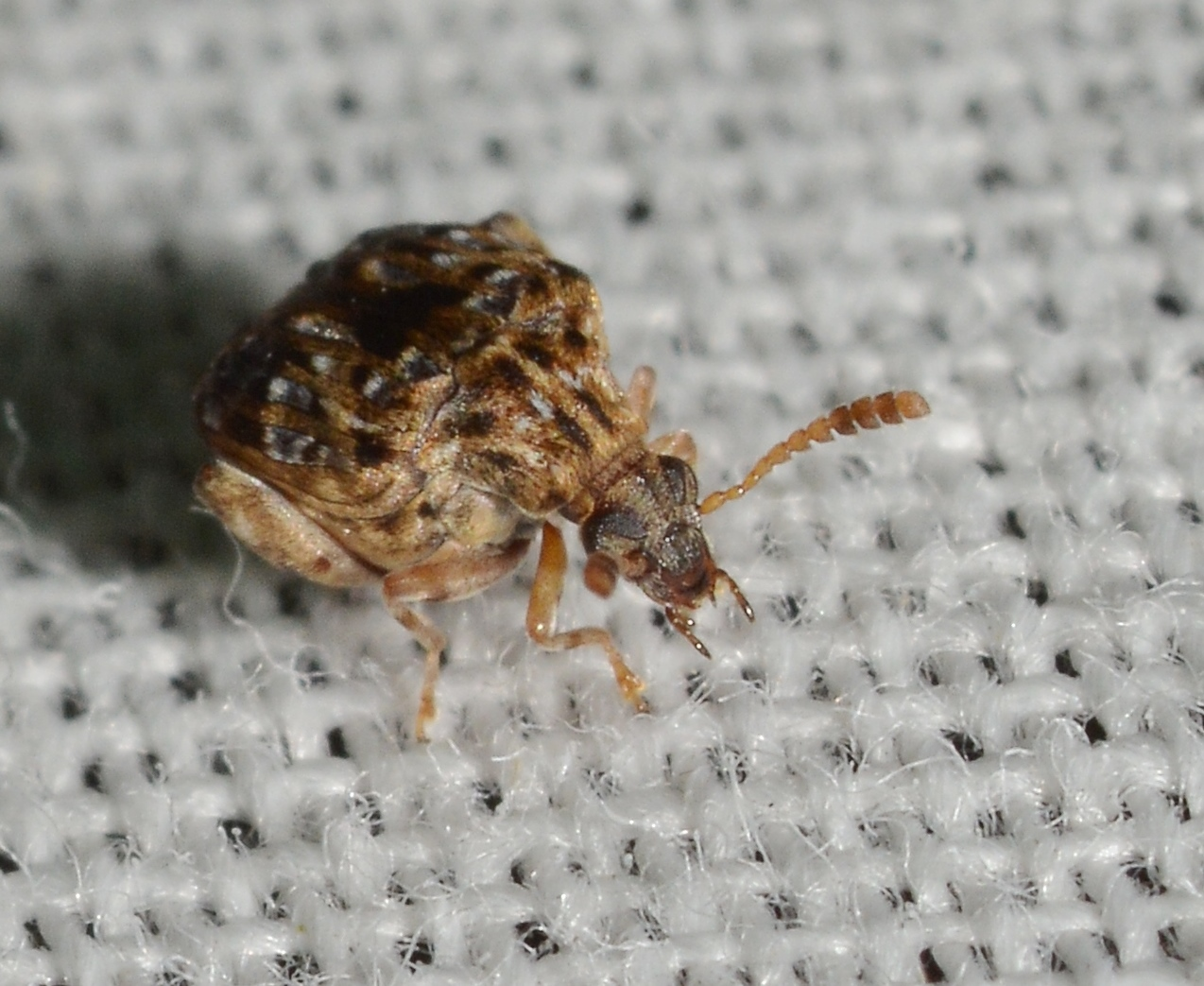

Scientific classification
- Domain: Eukaryota
- Kingdom: Animalia
- Phylum: Arthropoda
- Class: Insecta
- Order: Coleoptera
- Suborder: Polyphaga
- Infraorder: Cucujiformia
- Family: Chrysomelidae
- Genus: Gibbobruchus
- Species: G. mimus

Binomial name
- Gibbobruchus mimus (Say, 1831)

= Gibbobruchus mimus =

Species of beetle

Gibbobruchus mimus, the redbud bruchid, is a species of pea or bean weevil in the family Chrysomelidae. It is found in Central America and North America.

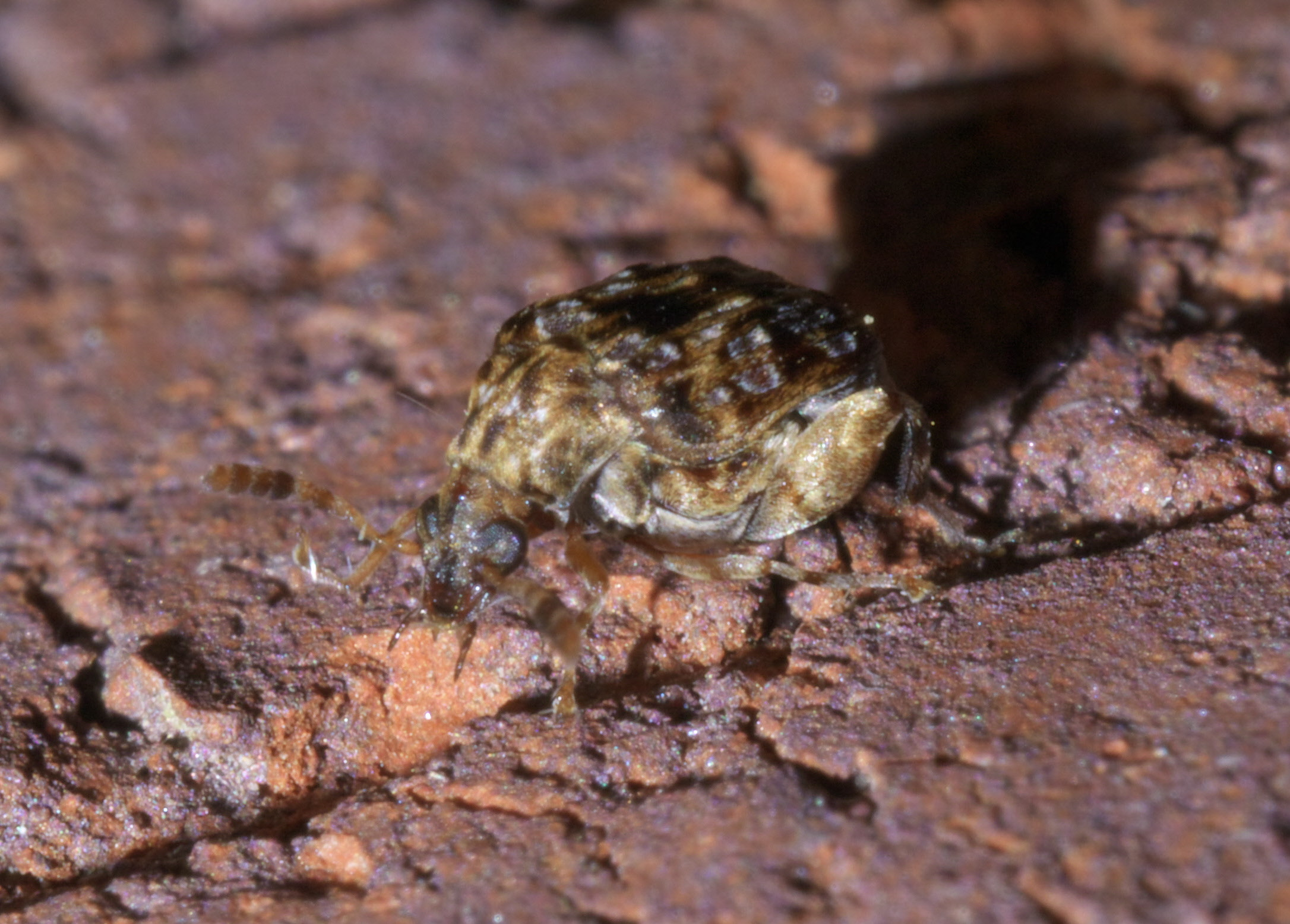
Redbud bruchid, Gibbobruchus mimus

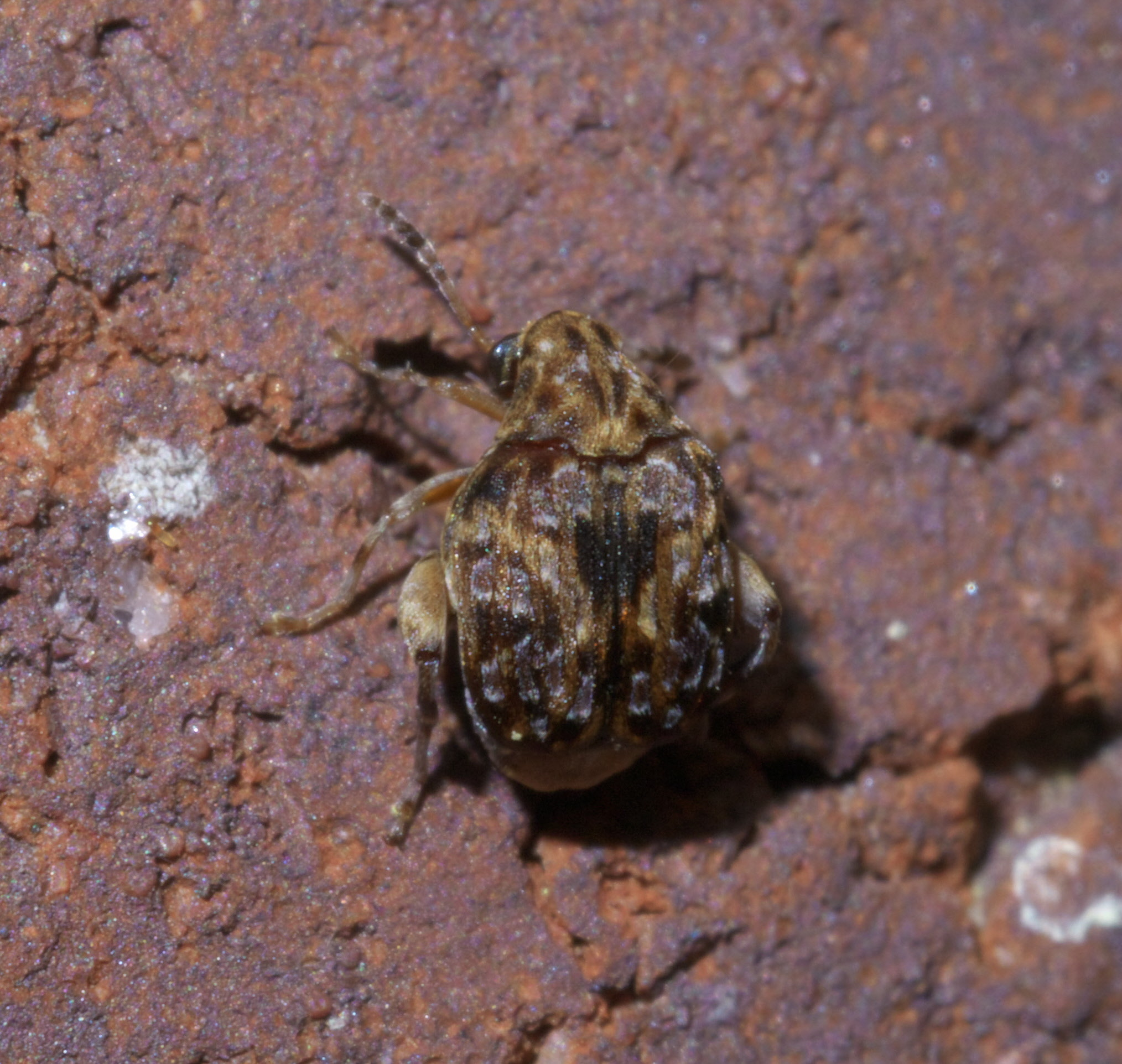
Redbud bruchid, Gibbobruchus mimus
