= Neltumius =

Scientific classification
- Domain: Eukaryota
- Kingdom: Animalia
- Phylum: Arthropoda
- Class: Insecta
- Order: Coleoptera
- Suborder: Polyphaga
- Infraorder: Cucujiformia
- Family: Chrysomelidae
- Subfamily: Bruchinae
- Tribe: Bruchini
- Genus: Neltumius; Bridwell, 1946

Genus of beetles

Neltumius is a genus of pea and bean weevils in the beetle family Chrysomelidae. There are at least three described species in Neltumius.

== Species ==
These three species belong to the genus Neltumius:

- Neltumius arizonensis (Schaeffer, 1904)
- Neltumius gibbithorax (Schaeffer, 1904)
- Neltumius texanus (Schaeffer, 1904)
