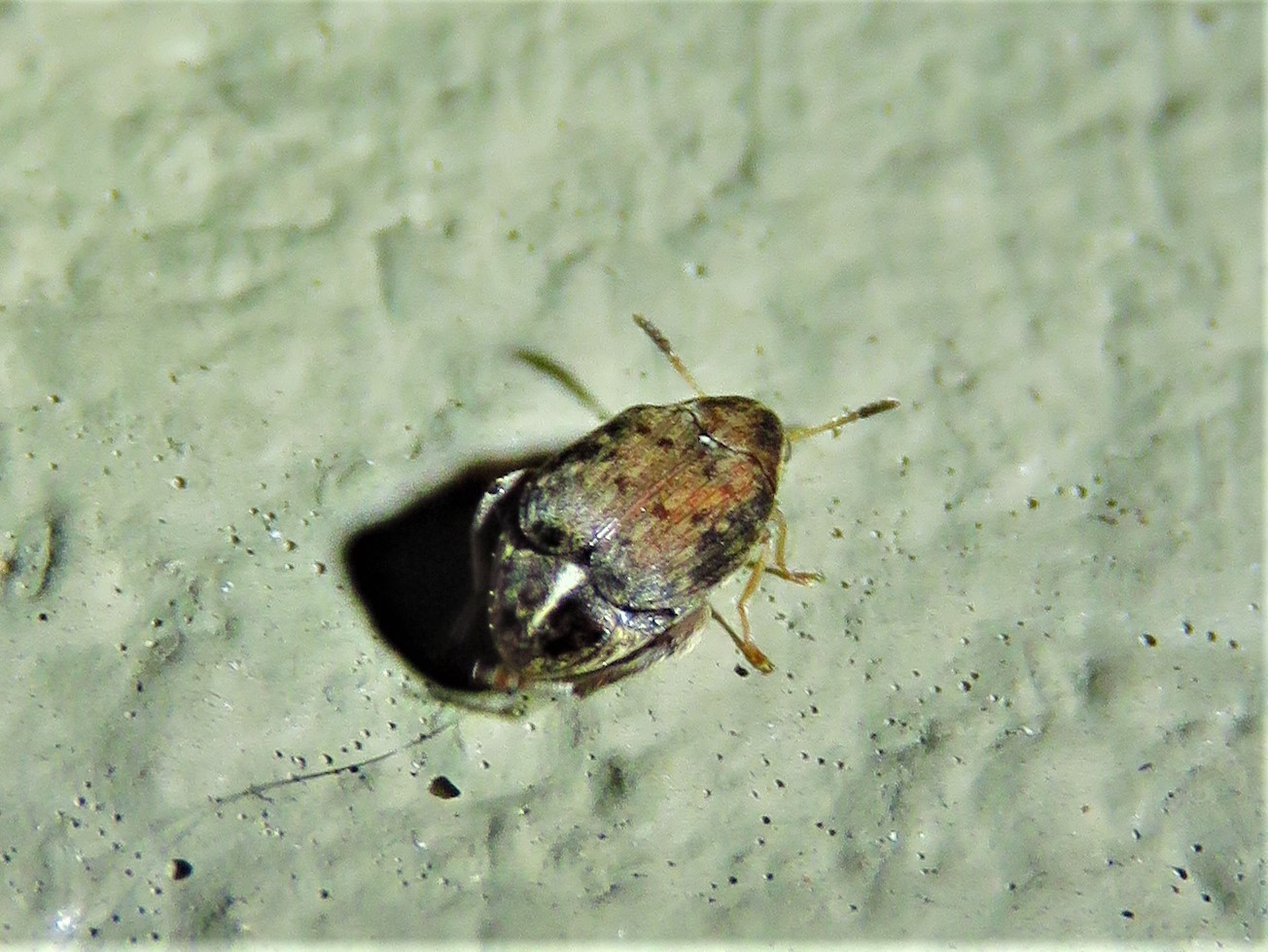

Scientific classification
- Kingdom: Animalia
- Phylum: Arthropoda
- Class: Insecta
- Order: Coleoptera
- Suborder: Polyphaga
- Infraorder: Cucujiformia
- Family: Chrysomelidae
- Genus: Merobruchus
- Species: M. insolitus

Binomial name
- Merobruchus insolitus (Sharp, 1885)

= Merobruchus insolitus =

Species of beetle

Merobruchus insolitus is a species of leaf beetle in the family Chrysomelidae. It is found in Central America and North America.
