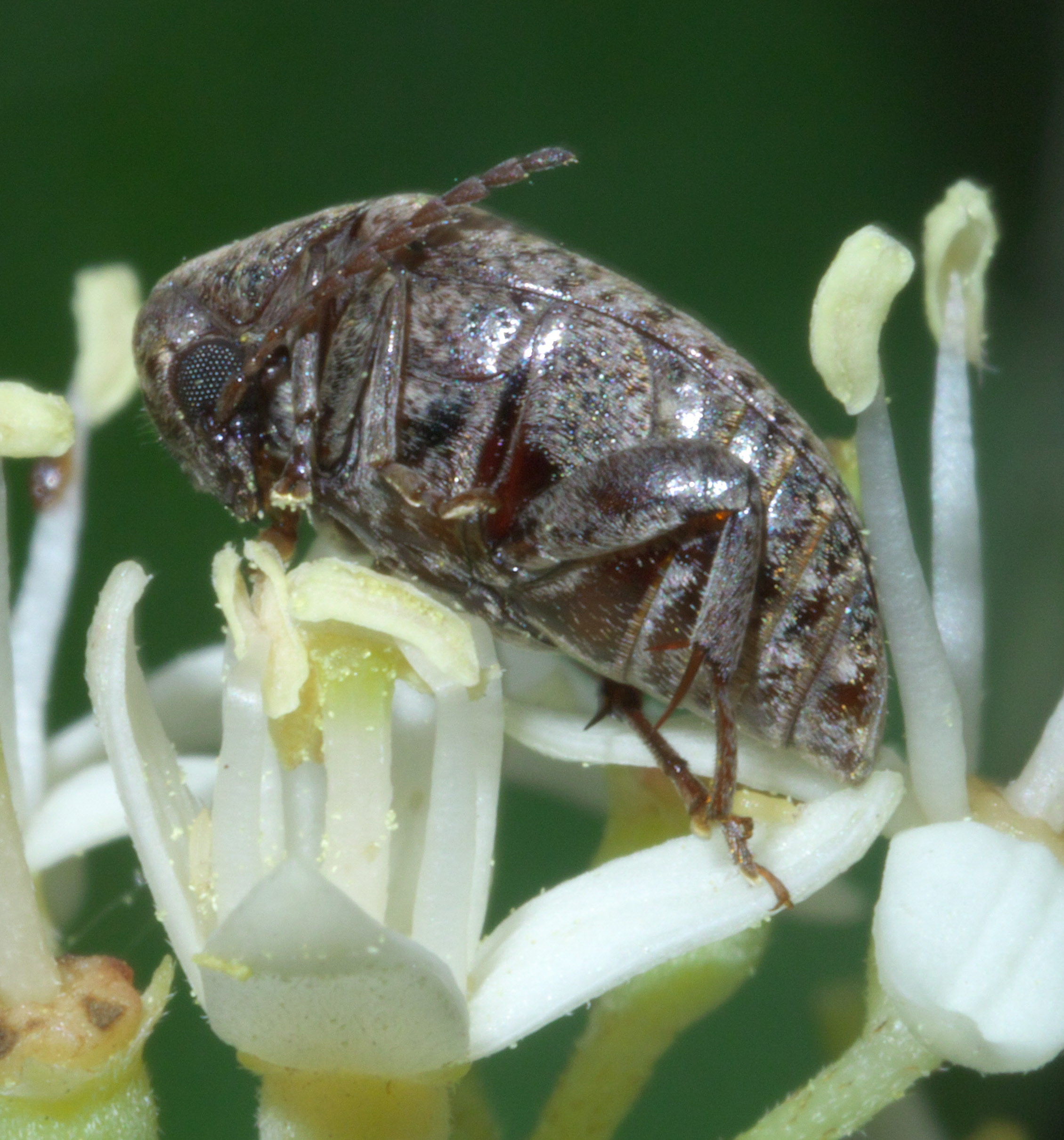

Scientific classification
- Kingdom: Animalia
- Phylum: Arthropoda
- Clade: Pancrustacea
- Class: Insecta
- Order: Coleoptera
- Suborder: Polyphaga
- Infraorder: Cucujiformia
- Family: Chrysomelidae
- Genus: Amblycerus
- Species: A. robiniae

Binomial name
- Amblycerus robiniae (Fabricius, 1781)

= Amblycerus robiniae =

Species of beetle

Amblycerus robiniae, the locust seed beetle, is a species of leaf beetle in the family Chrysomelidae. It is found in North America.

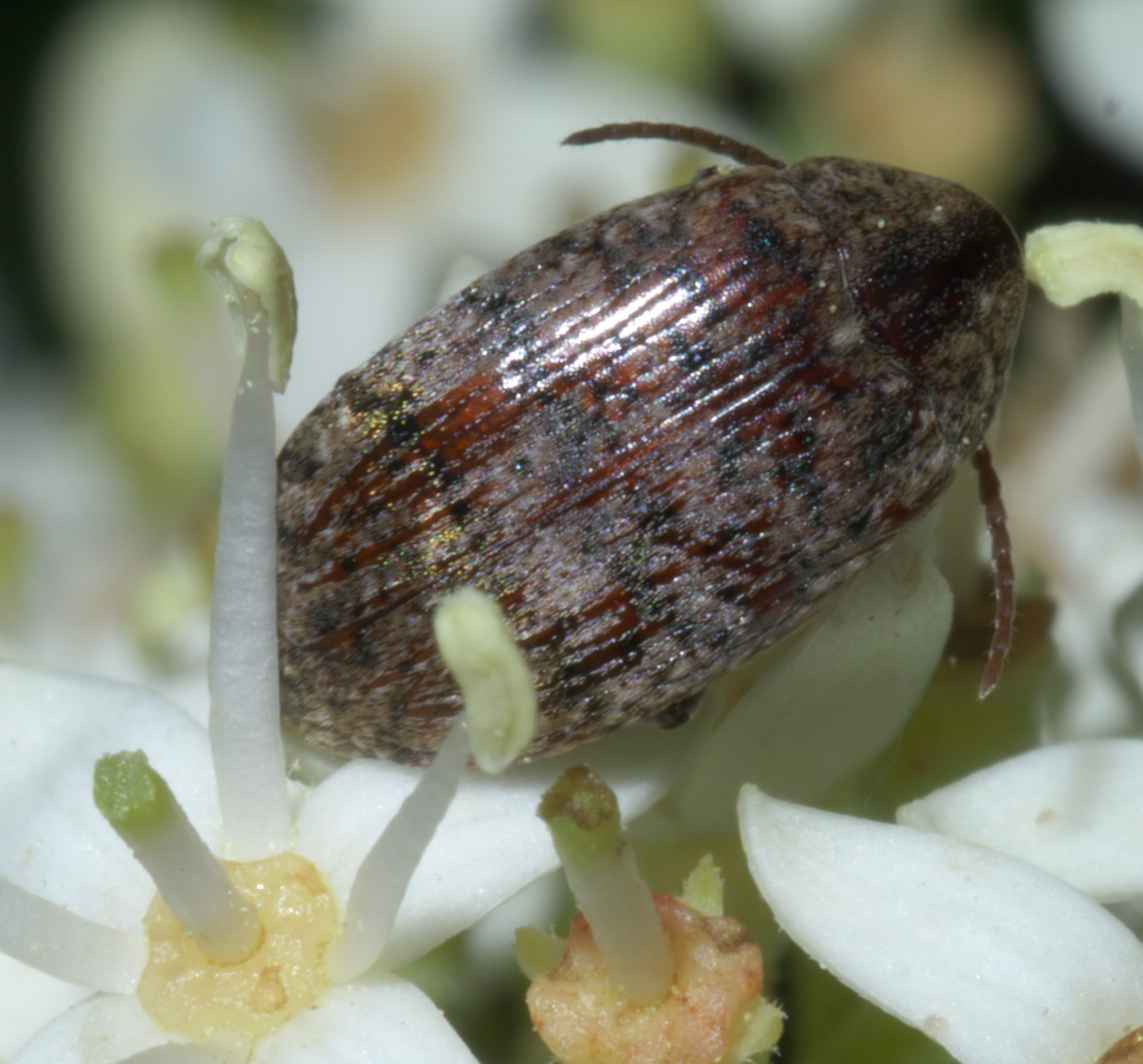
