= Fyodor Lukyanovich =

Fyodor Konstantinovich Lukyanovich (alternatively Luk'yanovich or Lukjanovich) (May 29, 1904 – January 17, 1942) was a Russian and Soviet entomologist who specialized in beetles belonging to the Bruchinae and Curculionoidea.

Lukyanovich was born in Poltava where he was educated before going to the Institute of Applied Zoology and Phytopathology at Leningrad in 1923. He completed his studies in 1926 but graduated only in 1930 after working at the Poltava Agricultural Experimental Station under D.A. Oglobin and G.G. Jacobson. In 1928 he surveyed locusts in Transbaikalia. In 1934 he began to work on insect taxonomy as an assistant of A. V. Martynova and from 1936 he worked at the All-Union Institute of Plant Protection identifying beetles. In 1938 he began to work at the Zoological Institute of the USSR Academy of Sciences under D.A. Oglobin. Over the course of his career he made numerous collection trips, wrote keys, and described species. He died during the Siege of Leningrad. A number of species have been named after him.
