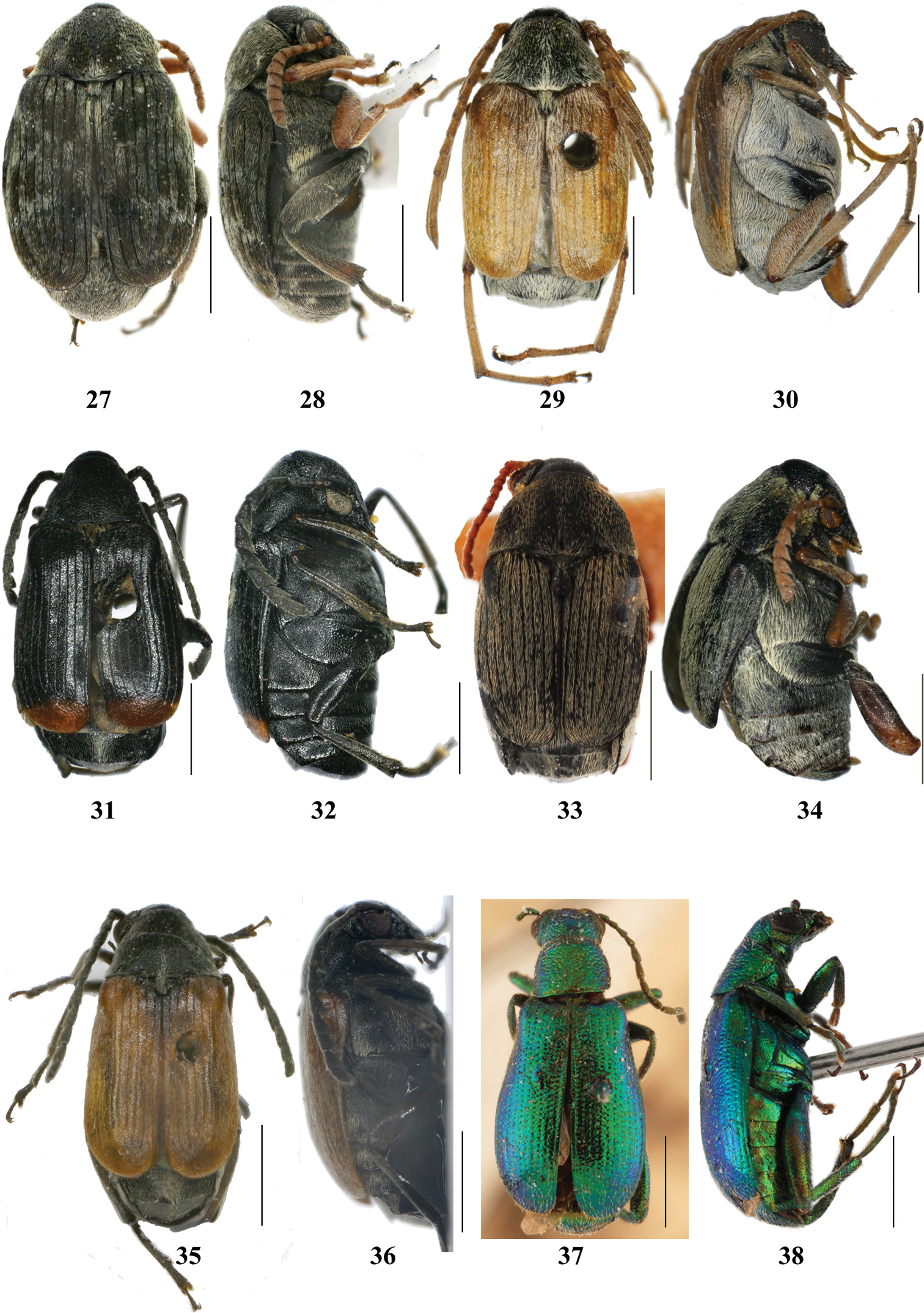

Scientific classification
- Kingdom: Animalia
- Phylum: Arthropoda
- Class: Insecta
- Order: Coleoptera
- Suborder: Polyphaga
- Infraorder: Cucujiformia
- Family: Chrysomelidae
- Subfamily: Bruchinae; Latreille, 1802

Tribes and subtribes
- Amblycerini; Amblycerina; Spermophagina; Bruchini; Acanthoscelidina (= Bruchidiina); Bruchina; Megacerina; Eubaptini; Kytorhinini; Pachymerini; Caryedontina; Caryopemina; Pachymerina; Rhaebini; †Myanmaropini

Diversity
- About 1,650 species in 70 genera

Synonyms
- Lariidae Bedel, 1901

= Bean weevil =

Bean weevils Temporal range: Cenomanian–Recent

Subfamily of beetles

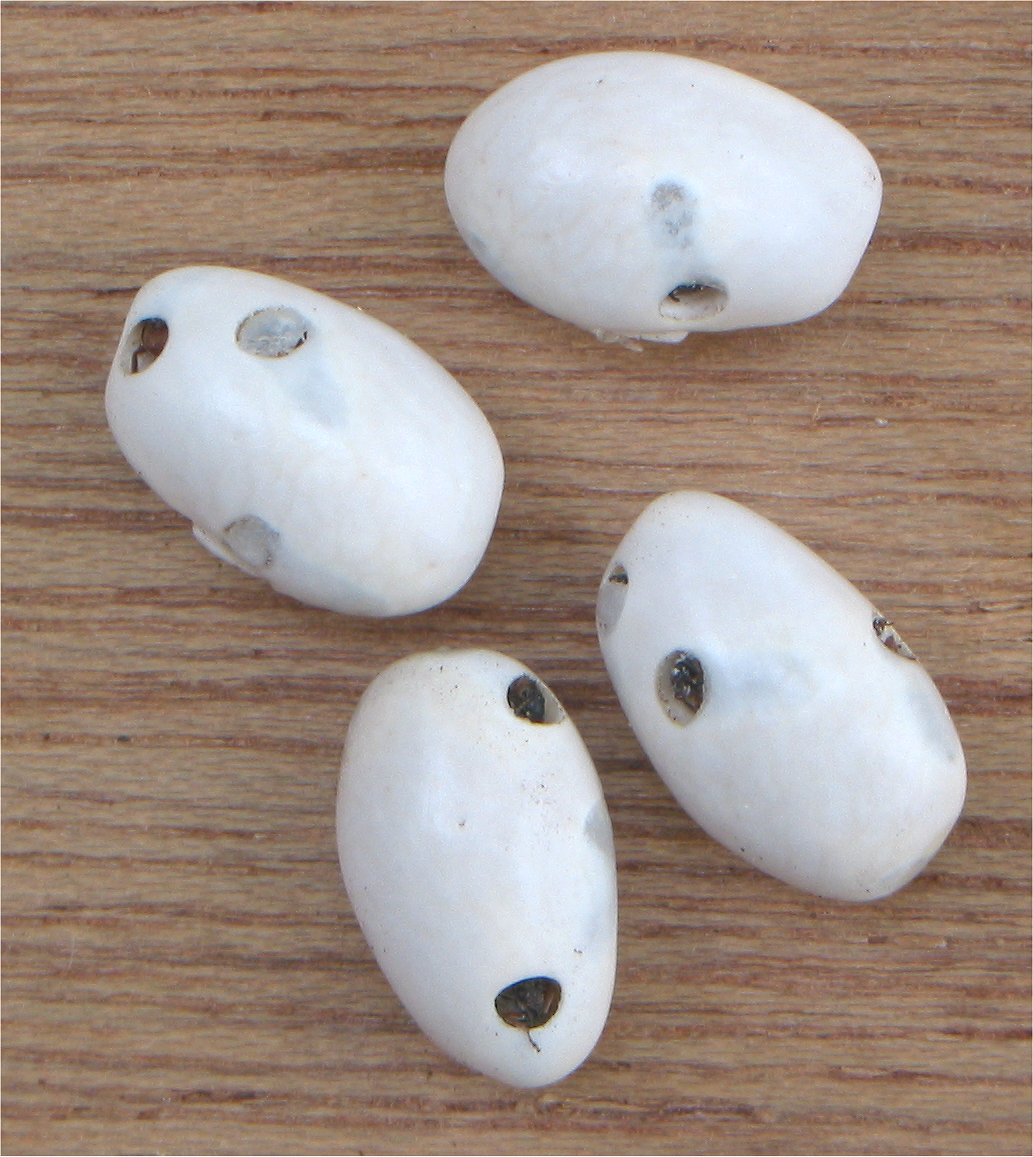
Damage to beans by larvae of the common bean weevil, Acanthoscelides obtectus

Bean weevils, also known as seed beetles, are members of the beetle subfamily Bruchinae. They are placed in the leaf beetle family Chrysomelidae, though they were historically treated as a separate family. Despite being called "bean weevils", they are not true weevils. The subfamily includes about 1,650 species and are found worldwide.

Bean weevils are generally compact and oval in shape, with small heads somewhat bent under. Sizes range from 1–22 millimetres (0.039–0.866 in) for some tropical species. Colors are usually black or brown, often with mottled patterns. Although their mandibles may be elongated, they do not have the long snouts characteristic of other weevils. A defining characteristic of this subfamily is that the elytra don't quite reach the tip of their abdomens (as seen in the header image).

The Bruchinae are granivores, and typically infest various kinds of seeds or beans (hence their common names), living most of their lives inside a single seed; Host plants tend to be legumes, but species will also be found in Convolvulaceae, Arecaceae, and Malvaceae. The adults deposit eggs on seeds of these plants, then the larvae chew their way into the seed. When ready to pupate, the larvae typically cut an exit hole, then return to their feeding chamber. Due to this, several species are considered pests. The adult weevils have a habit of feigning death and dropping from a plant when disturbed.

Several species are native to Great Britain, but there are also records of several introduced species from stored products in warehouses and dwellings, although these species cannot proliferate outside of heated buildings in that climate.

== Genera ==
This list of genera uses the new classification scheme, treating the bean weevils as a subfamily with six extant tribes, eight or nine subtribes, and one extinct tribe. The former names and ranks for the tribes and subtribes under the old classification, treating the been weevils as a family, are given in parentheses (except for Myanmaropini, which was established only for the new classification).

- Tribe Amblycerini Bridwell, 1932 (= Subfamily Amblycerinae)
  - Subtribe Amblycerina Bridwell, 1932 (= Tribe Amblycerini)
    - Amblycerus Thunberg, 1815
  - Subtribe Spermophagina Borowiec, 1987 (= Tribe Spermophagini)
    - Spermophagus Schoenherr, 1833
    - Zabrotes Horn, 1885
- Tribe Bruchini Latreille, 1802 (= Subfamily Bruchinae)
  - Subtribe Acanthoscelidina Bridwell, 1946 (= Tribe Acanthoscelidini)
    - Abutiloneus Bridwell, 1946
    - Acanthoscelides Schilsky, 1905
    - Algarobius Bridwell, 1946
    - Althaeus Bridwell, 1946
    - Bonaerius Bridwell, 1952
    - Caryedes Hummel, 1827
    - Cosmobruchus Bridwell, 1931
    - Ctenocolum Kingsolver & Whitehead, 1974
    - Dahlibruchus Bridwell, 1931
    - Gibbobruchus Pic, 1913
    - Lithraeus Bridwell, 1952
    - Margaritabruchus Romero & Johnson, 2001
    - Meibomeus Bridwell, 1946
    - Megasennius Whitehead & Kingsolver, 1975
    - Merobruchus Bridwell, 1946
    - Mimosestes Bridwell, 1946
    - Neltumius Bridwell, 1946
    - Neobruchidius Johnson & Romero, 2006
    - Palpibruchus Borowiec, 1987
    - Pectinibruchus Kingsolver, 1967
    - Penthobruchus Kingsolver, 1973
    - Pseudopachymerina Zacher, 1952
    - Pygiopachymerus Pic, 1911
    - Rhipibruchus Bridwell, 1932
    - Scutobruchus Kingsolver, 1968
    - Sennius Bridwell, 1946
    - Spatulobruchus Borowiec, 1987
    - Stator Bridwell, 1946
    - Stylantheus Bridwell, 1946
  - Subtribe Bruchidiina Bridwell, 1946 (= Tribe Bruchidiini) (Note: This subtribe is sometimes combined with Acanthoscelidina.)
    - Acanthobruchidius Borowiec, 1980
    - Borowiecius Anton, 1994
    - Bruchidius Schilsky, 1905
    - Callosobruchus Pic, 1902
    - Conicobruchus Decelle, 1951
    - Decellebruchus Borowiec, 1987
    - Horridobruchus Borowiec, 1984
    - Kingsolverius Borowiec, 1987
    - Megabruchidius Borowiec, 1984
    - Palaeoacanthoscelides Borowiec, 1985
    - Parasulcobruchus Anton, 1999
    - Pygobruchidius Pic, 1951
    - Salviabruchus Decelle, 1982
    - Specularius Bridwell, 1938
    - Sulcobruchus Chûjô, 1937
    - Tuberculobruchus Decelle, 1951
  - Subtribe Bruchina Latreille, 1802 (= Tribe Bruchini)
    - Bruchus Linnaeus, 1767
  - Subtribe Megacerina Bridwell, 1946 (= Tribe Megacerini)
    - Megacerus Fåhraeus, 1839
- Tribe Eubaptini Bridwell, 1932 (= Subfamily Eubaptinae)
  - Eubaptus Lacordaire, 1845
- Tribe Kytorhinini Bridwell, 1832 (= Subfamily Kytorhininae)
  - Kytorhinus Fischer von Waldheim, 1809
- Tribe Pachymerini Bridwell, 1929 (= Subfamily Pachymerinae)
  - Subtribe Caryedontina Bridwell, 1929 (= Tribe Caryedontini)
    - Aforedon Decelle, 1965
    - Caryedon Schoenherr, 1823
    - Caryotrypes Decelle, 1968
    - Exoctenophorus Decelle, 1968
    - Mimocaryedon Decelle, 1968
  - Subtribe Caryopemina Bridwell, 1929 (= Tribe Caryomepini)
    - Caryopemon Jekel, 1855
    - Diegobruchus Pic, 1913
    - Protocaryopemon Borowiec, 1987
  - Subtribe Pachymerina Bridwell, 1929 (= Tribe Pachymerini)
    - Butiobruchus Prevett, 1966
    - Caryobruchus Bridwell, 1929
    - Caryoborus Schoenherr, 1833
    - Pachymerus Thunberg, 1805
    - †Mesopachymerus Poinar, 2005 Canadian amber, Campanian
- Tribe Rhaebini Chapuis, 1874 (= Subfamily Rhaebinae)
  - Rhaebus Fischer von Waldheim, 1824
- Tribe †Myanmaropini Legalov et al., 2020
  - †Myanmarops Legalov et al., 2020 Burmese amber, Myanmar, Cenomanian
