= Holepyris sylvanidis =

Scientific classification
- Kingdom: Animalia
- Phylum: Arthropoda
- Clade: Pancrustacea
- Class: Insecta
- Order: Hymenoptera
- Family: Bethylidae
- Genus: Holepyris
- Species: H. sylvanidis

Binomial name
- Holepyris sylvanidis (Brèthes, 1913)

Synonyms
- Parepyris sylvanidis Bréthes, 1913; Rhabdepyris zeae Turner & Waterston, 1921

Species of insect

Holepyris sylvanidis is a species of hymenopteran parasitoid in the family Bethylidae. It parasitizes pests of stored products. Its hosts include the confused flour beetle (preferred host), red flour beetle, sawtoothed grain beetle, merchant grain beetle, and rusty grain beetle.
