= Pristepyris masii =

Scientific classification
- Kingdom: Animalia
- Phylum: Arthropoda
- Class: Insecta
- Order: Hymenoptera
- Family: Bethylidae
- Genus: Pristepyris
- Species: P. masii

Binomial name
- Pristepyris masii (Soika, 1933)

Synonyms
- Pristocera masii Giordani Soika, 1933; Acrepyris masii (Giordani Soika, 1933); Pristepyris masii (Soika, 1933)

Species of wasp

Pristepyris masii is a species of pristocerine wasp in the family Bethylidae. It is known from Azerbaijan, Georgia, Italy, Russia and Turkey. It is the only palearctic species in the genus Pristepyris. They are active from July to October. The female was undescribed until 2021.

== Description ==
The male is mainly black, while the female is mainly yellowish. If a specimen certainly belongs to the subfamily Pristocerinae and is from the palearctic region, then the male can be identified on having metasomal segments that are entirely black, the hypopygium (a part of the male reproductive organ) not being divided in two lobes (the diagnostic character of Pristocera is that the hypopygium is divided into two lobes), and the distal part of the harpe being slender and slightly curved. The body length of the male is 5–8 mm. The female can be identified by the median lobe of the clypeus having two short projections and a central notch (when viewed dorsally). The body length of the female is 4–6 mm.
