= Cephalonomia tarsalis =

Scientific classification
- Kingdom: Animalia
- Phylum: Arthropoda
- Clade: Pancrustacea
- Class: Insecta
- Order: Hymenoptera
- Family: Bethylidae
- Genus: Cephalonomia
- Species: C. tarsalis

Binomial name
- Cephalonomia tarsalis (Ashmead), 1893

Synonyms
- Cephalonomia carinata Kieffer, 1907

Species of wasp

Cephalonomia tarsalis is an idiobiont ectoparasitoid hymenopteran in the family Bethylidae. Known hosts include sawtoothed grain beetle (Oryzaephilus surinamensis), wheat weevil (Sitophilus granarius), rice weevil (Sitophilus oryzae), maize weevil (Sitophilus zeamais), and red flour beetle (Tribolium castaneum).

== Biology ==
On Oryzaephilus surinamensis, fertilized female C. tarsalis lay on average 85 eggs, and non-fertilized females lay on average 50 eggs. Adult females need to host-feed to initiate oviposition. Upon paralyzing a host (a beetle larva or pupa) the female typically lays two eggs (one female and one male) onto the host's body. When two larvae develop on the same host, they develop on average in 2/3 the time required for a solitary larva to develop.

Cocoons can overwinter. Males emerge two days prior to females. Males enter the cocoon of pharate females to mate. A male will mate with multiple females but females mate only once.

Adult lifespan is on average 35 days for females and 6 days for males at room temperature. The life cycle is completed in ~20 days at room temperature on Oryzaephilus surinamensis.

== Distribution ==
Cephalonomia tarsalis has been reported from India, the US, and the United Kingdom.
