= Dissomphalus daucinai =

Scientific classification
- Kingdom: Animalia
- Phylum: Arthropoda
- Clade: Pancrustacea
- Class: Insecta
- Order: Hymenoptera
- Family: Bethylidae
- Genus: Dissomphalus
- Species: D. daucinai

Binomial name
- Dissomphalus daucinai Nunes, Azevedo & Colombo, 2025

Species of wasp

Dissomphalus daucinai is a species of wasp in the family Bethylidae, belonging in the genus Dissomphalus. The species was described by João Lorenzo M. Nunes, Celso O. Azevedo and Wesley D. Colombo.

== Etymology ==
The epithet daucinai is from Daucina, which is the god of seafaring Fiji.

== Characterictics and taxonomy ==
The body length for a male Dissomphalus daucinai is 3.12 millimetres (0.123 in). The head and mesosoma are black, and the head is longer than being wide. The second metasomal segment has a lateral tergal process. The depression is very shallow, circular, and small, with the anterior, posterior, outer, and inner margins lacking setae. A small, low tubercle is colated at the center of the depression. Additionally, the pit is small and lacks setae.

The male genitalia has a harpe that contains a wide basal dorsal margin. It is longer than the gonostipes, and the apical margin is straight and curves mesad. The ventral margin is smooth. The digitus has a smooth dorsal margin, and the aedeagal ventral valve has an apex aligned with that of the dorsal valve. It is bifid, wide, abruptly narrowing apicad, and parallel. The aedeagal dorsal valve has two pairs of apical lobes: the outer lobe is very short, with an angled apical margin, while the inner pair is membranous and setose. The aedeagal apodeme extends beyond the genital ring.

== Distribution ==
The species have been found in Fiji, specifically Taveuni and Viti Levu.
