= Oryzaephilus acuminatus =

Scientific classification
- Kingdom: Animalia
- Phylum: Arthropoda
- Class: Insecta
- Order: Coleoptera
- Suborder: Polyphaga
- Infraorder: Cucujiformia
- Family: Silvanidae
- Genus: Oryzaephilus
- Species: O. acuminatus

Binomial name
- Oryzaephilus acuminatus Halstead, 1980

Species of beetle

Oryzaephilus acuminatus, is a species of silvan flat bark beetle native to India and Sri Lanka.

== Description ==
The species is very similar to saw-toothed grain beetle, Oryzaephilus surinamensis and the merchant grain beetle, Oryzaephilus mercator. Male is about 3.7 mm and female is about 3.5 mm in length. Adults are dark brown to black. Body is more elongate and covered with recumbent golden setae. Pronotum in large males. Lateral ridges and anterior pronotal angles are strongly developed. Larvae resemble the O. surinamensis.

== Distribution ==
The natural range of the animal is known to be India and Sri Lanka. In England, the species was imported on coconut shells. The species was originally not found in the United States. However, on 11 January 1983, some beetles were discovered in the storage area in Fort Myers, Florida, which stored Azadirachta indica imported from India to use as insecticides.
