= List of Dissomphalus species =

List of species in the genus Dissomphalus

As of 31 March 2026, the National Library of Medicine stated that there are 639 species of Dissomphalus. This list covers Dissomphalus species mentioned in Zootaxa, MDPI, WaspWeb, Plazi TreatmentBank, and SciELO Brazil.

== Dissomphalus species ==
- Dissomphalus abababa Mugrabi & Azevedo, 2016
- Dissomphalus abarus Brito & Azevedo, 2017
- Dissomphalus abaiae Nunes, Azevedo & Colombo, 2025
- Dissomphalus acutipupu Colombo & Azevedo, 2016
- Dissomphalus adscitus Benoit, 1956
- Dissomphalus afestus Brito & Azevedo, 2017
- Dissomphalus ailan Mugrabi & Azevedo, 2016
- Dissomphalus ais Mugrabi & Azevedo, 2016
- Dissomphalus aiskrim Mugrabi & Azevedo, 2016
- Dissomphalus alberti Benoit, 1957
- Dissomphalus alexandrinae Brito & Azevedo, 2024
- Dissomphalus alticlypeatus Azevedo, 2003
- Dissomphalus altivolans Evans, 1954
- Dissomphalus alzirae Brito & Azevedo, 2024
- Dissomphalus amana Colombo & Azevedo, 2016
- Dissomphalus ambrela Mugrabi & Azevedo, 2016
- Dissomphalus ameliae Brito & Azevedo, 2024
- Dissomphalus amplexus Redighieri & Azevedo, 2006
- Dissomphalus amplifoveatus Redighieri & Azevedo, 2006
- Dissomphalus amplus Redighieri & Azevedo, 2006
- Dissomphalus ananas Mugrabi & Azevedo, 2016
- Dissomphalus anien Mugrabi & Azevedo, 2016
- Dissomphalus angroni Colombo, Brito & Azevedo, 2026
- Dissomphalus angulatus Azevedo, 1999
- Dissomphalus anka Mugrabi & Azevedo, 2016
- Dissomphalus annae Brito & Azevedo, 2024
- Dissomphalus antonietae Brito & Azevedo, 2024
- Dissomphalus apertus Kieffer, 1910
- Dissomphalus arbeius Brito & Azevedo, 2017
- Dissomphalus archiboldi Evans, 1962
- Dissomphalus ardonius Brito & Azevedo, 2017
- Dissomphalus arensteinae Colombo, Brito & Azevedo, 2024
- Dissomphalus areius Brito & Azevedo, 2017
- Dissomphalus aretisus Brito & Azevedo, 2017
- Dissomphalus arteobius Brito & Azevedo, 2017
- Dissomphalus arteus Brito & Azevedo, 2017
- Dissomphalus asfartus Brito & Azevedo, 2017
- Dissomphalus asitius Brito & Azevedo, 2017
- Dissomphalus ashaurerae Brito & Azevedo, 2024
- Dissomphalus azagus Brito & Azevedo, 2017
- Dissomphalus babaeculus Benoit, 1957
- Dissomphalus bahiensis Redighieri & Azevedo, 2006
- Dissomphalus balus Mugrabi & Azevedo, 2016
- Dissomphalus bami Colombo, Brito & Azevedo, 2024
- Dissomphalus barayii Colombo, Brito & Azevedo, 2024
- Dissomphalus barbus Mugrabi & Azevedo, 2013
- Dissomphalus barneyi Colombo, Brito & Azevedo, 2024
- Dissomphalus basidentatus Azevedo, 1999
- Dissomphalus beatrizae Brito & Azevedo, 2024
- Dissomphalus biknait Mugrabi & Azevedo, 2016
- Dissomphalus bikoi Colombo, Brito & Azevedo, 2024
- Dissomphalus bilas Mugrabi & Azevedo, 2016
- Dissomphalus bicavatus Evans, 1979
- Dissomphalus bicerutus Azevedo, 2003
- Dissomphalus bifurcatus Azevedo, 1999
- Dissomphalus bilobatus Azevedo, 1999
- Dissomphalus binatang Mugrabi & Azevedo, 2016
- Dissomphalus bisket Mugrabi & Azevedo, 2016
- Dissomphalus blakbokis Mugrabi & Azevedo, 2016
- Dissomphalus bladei Colombo, Brito & Azevedo, 2024
- Dissomphalus boibumba Colombo & Azevedo, 2018
- Dissomphalus boitata Colombo & Azevedo, 2018
- Dissomphalus boiuna Colombo & Azevedo, 2018
- Dissomphalus boriae Brito & Azevedo, 2024
- Dissomphalus borus Brito & Azevedo, 2017
- Dissomphalus boto Colombo & Azevedo, 2018
- Dissomphalus blut Mugrabi & Azevedo, 2016
- Dissomphalus brami Colombo, Brito & Azevedo, 2024
- Dissomphalus brasiliensis Kieffer, 1910 (Note: D. hastatus and D. bispinulatus is accepted as a junior synonym.)
- Dissomphalus bratasusa Mugrabi & Azevedo, 2016
- Dissomphalus browni Terayama, 2004
- Dissomphalus brutusi Colombo, Brito & Azevedo, 2024
- Dissomphalus bukai Colombo, Brito & Azevedo, 2024
- Dissomphalus bului Nunes, Azevedo & Colombo, 2025
- Dissomphalus bun Mugrabi & Azevedo, 2016
- Dissomphalus burotuensis Nunes, Azevedo & Colombo, 2025
- Dissomphalus cachaliai Colombo, Brito & Azevedo, 2024
- Dissomphalus cacirus Colombo & Azevedo, 2016
- Dissomphalus caipora Colombo & Azevedo, 2018
- Dissomphalus cagawalui Nunes, Azevedo & Colombo, 2025
- Dissomphalus capelobo Colombo & Azevedo, 2018
- Dissomphalus caparao Colombo & Azevedo, 2016
- Dissomphalus capixaba Colombo & Azevedo, 2016
- Dissomphalus carmenae Brito & Azevedo, 2024
- Dissomphalus carolinae Brito & Azevedo, 2024
- Dissomphalus cassaemi Colombo, Brito & Azevedo, 2024
- Dissomphalus caviclypeus Evans, 1969
- Dissomphalus cervoides Azevedo, 2003
- Dissomphalus chamussoi Colombo, Brito & Azevedo, 2024
- Dissomphalus cherrus Mugrabi & Azevedo, 2013
- Dissomphalus chiangmaiensis Terayama, 2004
- Dissomphalus chiapanus Evans, 1962
- Dissomphalus citus Brito & Azevedo, 2017
- Dissomphalus cleggi Colombo, Brito & Azevedo, 2024
- Dissomphalus clypeatus Evans, 1954
- Dissomphalus clibanarius Benoit, 1957
- Dissomphalus clovisi Colombo & Azevedo, 2016
- Dissomphalus collaris Evans, 1962
- Dissomphalus completus Azevedo, 1999
- Dissomphalus concavatus Azevedo, 1999
- Dissomphalus confusus Ashmead, 1894
- Dissomphalus congo Colombo & Azevedo, 2016
- Dissomphalus conicus Azevedo, 2003
- Dissomphalus connubialis Evans, 1966
- Dissomphalus contractus Azevedo, 2003
- Dissomphalus cornutus Evans, 1964 (Note: D. teren is accepted as a junior synonym.)
- Dissomphalus coronatus Alencar & Azevedo, 2006
- Dissomphalus corvusi Colombo, Brito & Azevedo, 2026
- Dissomphalus culteratus Alencar & Azevedo, 2006
- Dissomphalus curvifoveatus Azevedo, 2003
- Dissomphalus curvilongus Azevedo, 2001
- Dissomphalus curviventris Azevedo, 2003
- Dissomphalus crassus Redighieri & Azevedo, 2006
- Dissomphalus cristatus Redighieri & Azevedo, 2004
- Dissomphalus crucialis Benoit, 1957
- Dissomphalus cuca Colombo & Azevedo, 2018
- Dissomphalus curupira Colombo & Azevedo, 2018
- Dissomphalus dadooi Colombo, Brito & Azevedo, 2024
- Dissomphalus daimen Mugrabi & Azevedo, 2016
- Dissomphalus dakuwaqai Nunes, Azevedo & Colombo, 2025
- Dissomphalus dandarae Brito & Azevedo, 2024
- Dissomphalus daneus Mugrabi & Azevedo, 2013
- Dissomphalus danielsi Colombo, Brito & Azevedo, 2024
- Dissomphalus daucinai Nunes, Azevedo & Colombo, 2025
- Dissomphalus davus Mugrabi & Azevedo, 2013
- Dissomphalus deaneae Brito & Azevedo, 2024
- Dissomphalus declinatus Alencar & Azevedo, 2006
- Dissomphalus degeii Nunes, Azevedo & Colombo, 2025
- Dissomphalus dewel Mugrabi & Azevedo, 2016
- Dissomphalus dialei Colombo, Brito & Azevedo, 2024
- Dissomphalus differens Redighieri & Azevedo, 2006
- Dissomphalus digitatus Azevedo, 1999
- Dissomphalus dilatatus Azevedo, 1999
- Dissomphalus distans Redighieri & Azevedo, 2006
- Dissomphalus divisus Redighieri & Azevedo, 2006
- Dissomphalus dlaminii Colombo, Brito & Azevedo, 2024
- Dissomphalus doni Colombo, Brito & Azevedo, 2024
- Dissomphalus dullahi Colombo, Brito & Azevedo, 2024
- Dissomphalus dumai Colombo, Brito & Azevedo, 2024
- Dissomphalus dumosus Evans, 1966
- Dissomphalus ebrahimi Colombo, Brito & Azevedo, 2024
- Dissomphalus eksospaip Mugrabi & Azevedo, 2016
- Dissomphalus elegans Redighieri & Azevedo, 2006
- Dissomphalus eliasi Colombo, Brito & Azevedo, 2026
- Dissomphalus elisae Brito & Azevedo, 2024
- Dissomphalus elzae Brito & Azevedo, 2024
- Dissomphalus enedinae Brito & Azevedo, 2024
- Dissomphalus ensel Mugrabi & Azevedo, 2016
- Dissomphalus epitus Mugrabi & Azevedo, 2013
- Dissomphalus ettus Brito & Azevedo, 2017
- Dissomphalus eulaliae Brito & Azevedo, 2024
- Dissomphalus evaristoae Brito & Azevedo, 2024
- Dissomphalus evonneae Colombo, Brito & Azevedo, 2024
- Dissomphalus excellens Redighieri & Azevedo, 2006
- Dissomphalus excisicrus Kieffer, 1912
- Dissomphalus extrarramis Azevedo, 1999
- Dissomphalus fakui Colombo, Brito & Azevedo, 2024
- Dissomphalus falcatus Evans, 1962
- Dissomphalus ferocus Azevedo, 2003
- Dissomphalus ferrerus Mugrabi & Azevedo, 2013
- Dissomphalus filiformis Redighieri & Azevedo, 2006
- Dissomphalus filus Azevedo, 2003
- Dissomphalus fimbriatus Redighieri & Azevedo, 2006
- Dissomphalus firminoi Colombo, Brito & Azevedo, 2026
- Dissomphalus firmus Redighieri & Azevedo, 2006
- Dissomphalus forchhammeri Krombein, 1989
- Dissomphalus fredi Colombo & Azevedo, 2016
- Dissomphalus fulgrimi Colombo, Brito & Azevedo, 2026
- Dissomphalus fungosus Evans, 1979
- Dissomphalus gabrus Mugrabi & Azevedo, 2013
- Dissomphalus gagai Colombo, Brito & Azevedo, 2024
- Dissomphalus galeatus Alencar & Azevedo, 2006
- Dissomphalus gamtri Mugrabi & Azevedo, 2016
- Dissomphalus gandhiae Colombo, Brito & Azevedo, 2024
- Dissomphalus geniculatus Azevedo, 2003
- Dissomphalus geanus Mugrabi & Azevedo, 2013
- Dissomphalus geortus Brito & Azevedo, 2017
- Dissomphalus gerti Colombo, Brito & Azevedo, 2024
- Dissomphalus gigantus Azevedo, 1999
- Dissomphalus gilvipes Evans, 1964
- Dissomphalus gionus Mugrabi & Azevedo, 2013
- Dissomphalus globiceps Benoit, 1957
- Dissomphalus goldbergi Colombo, Brito & Azevedo, 2024
- Dissomphalus gordus Azevedo, 2003
- Dissomphalus gorgor Mugrabi & Azevedo, 2016
- Dissomphalus gqabii Colombo, Brito & Azevedo, 2024
- Dissomphalus graun Mugrabi & Azevedo, 2016
- Dissomphalus grazielae Brito & Azevedo, 2024
- Dissomphalus guaraniColombo & Azevedo, 2016
- Dissomphalus guidonae Brito & Azevedo, 2024
- Dissomphalus gumedei Colombo, Brito & Azevedo, 2024
- Dissomphalus guttus Azevedo, 2003
- Dissomphalus gwalai Colombo, Brito & Azevedo, 2024
- Dissomphalus gxowae Colombo, Brito & Azevedo, 2024
- Dissomphalus hama Mugrabi & Azevedo, 2016
- Dissomphalus hanii Colombo, Brito & Azevedo, 2024
- Dissomphalus heloiseae Colombo, Brito & Azevedo, 2024
- Dissomphalus hemisphaericus Azevedo, 2003
- Dissomphalus horusi Colombo, Brito & Azevedo, 2026
- Dissomphalus h-ramus Redighieri & Azevedo, 2004
- Dissomphalus iara Colombo & Azevedo, 2018
- Dissomphalus ibirapitanga Colombo & Azevedo, 2016
- Dissomphalus ibrastus Brito & Azevedo, 2017
- Dissomphalus ilarius Brito & Azevedo, 2017
- Dissomphalus inclinatus Redighieri & Azevedo, 2006
- Dissomphalus incomptus Evans, 1964
- Dissomphalus indeceptibilis Benoit, 1957
- Dissomphalus infissus Evans, 1969
- Dissomphalus inflexus Redighieri & Azevedo, 2006
- Dissomphalus intradentatus Azevedo, 2003
- Dissomphalus iozus Brito & Azevedo, 2017
- Dissomphalus iracema Colombo & Azevedo, 2018
- Dissomphalus irupe Colombo & Azevedo, 2018
- Dissomphalus isortus Brito & Azevedo, 2017
- Dissomphalus isteus Brito & Azevedo, 2017
- Dissomphalus isui Colombo, Brito & Azevedo, 2024
- Dissomphalus jaghataii Colombo, Brito & Azevedo, 2026
- Dissomphalus jaquelineae Brito & Azevedo, 2024
- Dissomphalus joei Colombo, Brito & Azevedo, 2024
- Dissomphalus joelus Mugrabi & Azevedo, 2013
- Dissomphalus joaquinae Colombo & Azevedo, 2018
- Dissomphalus johannae Brito & Azevedo, 2024
- Dissomphalus jonasi Colombo, Brito & Azevedo, 2024
- Dissomphalus jordani Colombo, Brito & Azevedo, 2024
- Dissomphalus jubus Mugrabi & Azevedo, 2013
- Dissomphalus julius Mugrabi & Azevedo, 2013
- Dissomphalus jurupari Colombo & Azevedo, 2018
- Dissomphalus kakamora Nunes, Azevedo & Colombo, 2025
- Dissomphalus kakaruk Mugrabi & Azevedo, 2016
- Dissomphalus kas Mugrabi & Azevedo, 2016
- Dissomphalus kasang Mugrabi & Azevedo, 2016
- Dissomphalus kasrilsi Colombo, Brito & Azevedo, 2024
- Dissomphalus kathyi Colombo, Brito & Azevedo, 2024
- Dissomphalus kauvarda Nunes, Azevedo & Colombo, 2025
- Dissomphalus kava Nunes, Azevedo & Colombo, 2025
- Dissomphalus kelsus Mugrabi & Azevedo, 2013
- Dissomphalus kiau Mugrabi & Azevedo, 2016
- Dissomphalus kina Mugrabi & Azevedo, 2016
- Dissomphalus klok Mugrabi & Azevedo, 2016
- Dissomphalus koki Mugrabi & Azevedo, 2016
- Dissomphalus kotanei Colombo, Brito & Azevedo, 2024
- Dissomphalus krombeini Azevedo, 1999
- Dissomphalus kuara Colombo & Azevedo, 2016
- Dissomphalus kukamba Mugrabi & Azevedo, 2016
- Dissomphalus kuzwayoae Colombo, Brito & Azevedo, 2024
- Dissomphalus lamellatus Redighieri & Azevedo, 2006
- Dissomphalus laminaris Redighieri & Azevedo, 2004
- Dissomphalus laticephalus Azevedo, 2003
- Dissomphalus latimerus Azevedo, 2003
- Dissomphalus latus Azevedo, 2003
- Dissomphalus leliae Brito & Azevedo, 2024
- Dissomphalus lewa Mugrabi & Azevedo, 2016
- Dissomphalus lidinus Mugrabi & Azevedo, 2013
- Dissomphalus limae Brito & Azevedo, 2024
- Dissomphalus linearis Azevedo, 1999
- Dissomphalus lipectorae Brito & Azevedo, 2024
- Dissomphalus lobicephalus Azevedo, 2003
- Dissomphalus lobisserratus Azevedo, 1999
- Dissomphalus lorgari Colombo, Brito & Azevedo, 2026
- Dissomphalus loliwara Mugrabi & Azevedo, 2016
- Dissomphalus luisae Brito & Azevedo, 2024
- Dissomphalus lumae Brito & Azevedo, 2024
- Dissomphalus lutzae Brito & Azevedo, 2024
- Dissomphalus maci Colombo, Brito & Azevedo, 2024
- Dissomphalus madikizelae Colombo, Brito & Azevedo, 2024
- Dissomphalus madrali Nunes, Azevedo & Colombo, 2025
- Dissomphalus magarethae Brito & Azevedo, 2024
- Dissomphalus magnetus Mugrabi & Azevedo, 2013
- Dissomphalus magnus Redighieri & Azevedo, 2006
- Dissomphalus magnusi Colombo, Brito & Azevedo, 2026
- Dissomphalus mahlangui Colombo, Brito & Azevedo, 2024
- Dissomphalus makwetui Colombo, Brito & Azevedo, 2024
- Dissomphalus malelei Colombo, Brito & Azevedo, 2024
- Dissomphalus maleo Mugrabi & Azevedo, 2016
- Dissomphalus mapinguari Colombo & Azevedo, 2018
- Dissomphalus matintaperera Colombo & Azevedo, 2018
- Dissomphalus mamoepai Colombo, Brito & Azevedo, 2024
- Dissomphalus mampei Colombo, Brito & Azevedo, 2024
- Dissomphalus mambu Mugrabi & Azevedo, 2016
- Dissomphalus mama Mugrabi & Azevedo, 2016
- Dissomphalus mami Mugrabi & Azevedo, 2016
- Dissomphalus mandelai Colombo, Brito & Azevedo, 2024
- Dissomphalus mandibulatus Azevedo, 2003
- Dissomphalus mandierdi Colombo, Brito & Azevedo, 2024
- Dissomphalus manus Azevedo, 2003
- Dissomphalus marksi Colombo, Brito & Azevedo, 2024
- Dissomphalus martae Brito & Azevedo, 2024
- Dissomphalus maryae Brito & Azevedo, 2024
- Dissomphalus mathalei Colombo, Brito & Azevedo, 2024
- Dissomphalus matomelae Colombo, Brito & Azevedo, 2024
- Dissomphalus matticus Benoit, 1957
- Dissomphalus mausgras Mugrabi & Azevedo, 2016
- Dissomphalus mazibukoi Colombo, Brito & Azevedo, 2024
- Dissomphalus mbekii Colombo, Brito & Azevedo, 2024
- Dissomphalus megomphalus Evans, 1969
- Dissomphalus merielsae Brito & Azevedo, 2024
- Dissomphalus mendicus Evans, 1969
- Dissomphalus meke Nunes, Azevedo & Colombo, 2025
- Dissomphalus mgibei Colombo, Brito & Azevedo, 2024
- Dissomphalus mhlabai Colombo, Brito & Azevedo, 2024
- Dissomphalus mhlambisoi Colombo, Brito & Azevedo, 2024
- Dissomphalus microstictus Evans, 1969
- Dissomphalus mikei Colombo, Brito & Azevedo, 2024
- Dissomphalus minii Colombo, Brito & Azevedo, 2024
- Dissomphalus mirabilis Evans, 1966
- Dissomphalus mirandae Brito & Azevedo, 2024
- Dissomphalus miriamaeColombo & Azevedo, 2016
- Dissomphalus mirim Colombo & Azevedo, 2016
- Dissomphalus mkizeae Colombo, Brito & Azevedo, 2024
- Dissomphalus mkwayii Colombo, Brito & Azevedo, 2024
- Dissomphalus mlamboi Colombo, Brito & Azevedo, 2024
- Dissomphalus mohohloi Colombo, Brito & Azevedo, 2024
- Dissomphalus mokabai Colombo, Brito & Azevedo, 2024
- Dissomphalus moketei Colombo, Brito & Azevedo, 2024
- Dissomphalus molaoai Colombo, Brito & Azevedo, 2024
- Dissomphalus molefei Colombo, Brito & Azevedo, 2024
- Dissomphalus mompatiae Colombo, Brito & Azevedo, 2024
- Dissomphalus montanus Kieffer, 1910
- Dissomphalus morobei Colombo, Brito & Azevedo, 2024
- Dissomphalus mortarioni Colombo, Brito & Azevedo, 2026
- Dissomphalus mosalai Colombo, Brito & Azevedo, 2024
- Dissomphalus motlanthei Colombo, Brito & Azevedo, 2024
- Dissomphalus motsoaledii Colombo, Brito & Azevedo, 2024
- Dissomphalus musukau Nunes, Azevedo & Colombo, 2025
- Dissomphalus mwalo Mugrabi & Azevedo, 2016
- Dissomphalus muli Mugrabi & Azevedo, 2016
- Dissomphalus mugrus Mugrabi & Azevedo, 2013
- Dissomphalus mxemgeae Colombo, Brito & Azevedo, 2024
- Dissomphalus mxengei Colombo, Brito & Azevedo, 2024
- Dissomphalus naidooi Colombo, Brito & Azevedo, 2024
- Dissomphalus nairi Colombo, Brito & Azevedo, 2024
- Dissomphalus naivukii Nunes, Azevedo & Colombo, 2025
- Dissomphalus nandus Mugrabi & Azevedo, 2013
- Dissomphalus nanellus Evans, 1969
- Dissomphalus nangnangae Nunes, Azevedo & Colombo, 2025
- Dissomphalus napo Evans, 1979
- Dissomphalus naqaii Nunes, Azevedo & Colombo, 2025
- Dissomphalus natnat Mugrabi & Azevedo, 2016
- Dissomphalus ndunganei Colombo, Brito & Azevedo, 2024
- Dissomphalus nduzumoi Colombo, Brito & Azevedo, 2024
- Dissomphalus nek Mugrabi & Azevedo, 2016
- Dissomphalus nganivatu Nunes, Azevedo & Colombo, 2025
- Dissomphalus ngoyiae Colombo, Brito & Azevedo, 2024
- Dissomphalus nicaeus Benoit, 1956
- Dissomphalus nisiae Brito & Azevedo, 2024
- Dissomphalus niuspapa Mugrabi & Azevedo, 2016
- Dissomphalus nkadimengi Colombo, Brito & Azevedo, 2024
- Dissomphalus nkomoi Colombo, Brito & Azevedo, 2024
- Dissomphalus nontsikeloi Colombo, Brito & Azevedo, 2024
- Dissomphalus ntantalae Colombo, Brito & Azevedo, 2024
- Dissomphalus nus Mugrabi & Azevedo, 2016
- Dissomphalus nyembeae Colombo, Brito & Azevedo, 2024
- Dissomphalus nzoi Colombo, Brito & Azevedo, 2024
- Dissomphalus oksanae Fadeev, 2022
- Dissomphalus opis Mugrabi & Azevedo, 2016
- Dissomphalus pahadi Colombo, Brito & Azevedo, 2024
- Dissomphalus papai Mugrabi & Azevedo, 2016
- Dissomphalus patoni Colombo, Brito & Azevedo, 2024
- Dissomphalus paulus Mugrabi & Azevedo, 2013
- Dissomphalus peculiaris Redighieri & Azevedo, 2006
- Dissomphalus pembai Colombo, Brito & Azevedo, 2024
- Dissomphalus penhae Brito & Azevedo, 2024
- Dissomphalus pepa Mugrabi & Azevedo, 2016
- Dissomphalus personatus Redighieri & Azevedo, 2006
- Dissomphalus perturaboi Colombo, Brito & Azevedo, 2026
- Dissomphalus pikinini Mugrabi & Azevedo, 2016
- Dissomphalus pilus Alencar & Azevedo, 2008
- Dissomphalus pis Mugrabi & Azevedo, 2016
- Dissomphalus pisin Mugrabi & Azevedo, 2016
- Dissomphalus piscicercus Azevedo, 2003
- Dissomphalus pityanai Colombo, Brito & Azevedo, 2024
- Dissomphalus plaua Mugrabi & Azevedo, 2016
- Dissomphalus plaumanni Evans, 1969
- Dissomphalus ples Mugrabi & Azevedo, 2016
- Dissomphalus pokelai Colombo, Brito & Azevedo, 2024
- Dissomphalus politus Ashmead, 1894
- Dissomphalus popo Mugrabi & Azevedo, 2016
- Dissomphalus potyra Colombo & Azevedo, 2016
- Dissomphalus prilus Mugrabi & Azevedo, 2013
- Dissomphalus pronus Alencar & Azevedo, 2008
- Dissomphalus prophylax Benoit, 1957
- Dissomphalus punctatus Kieffer, 1910
- Dissomphalus pukpuk Mugrabi & Azevedo, 2016
- Dissomphalus puriusColombo & Azevedo, 2016
- Dissomphalus puteolus Evans, 1969
- Dissomphalus pyata Colombo & Azevedo, 2016
- Dissomphalus qeqei Colombo, Brito & Azevedo, 2024
- Dissomphalus qiqi Nunes, Azevedo & Colombo, 2025
- Dissomphalus racarus Brito & Azevedo, 2017
- Dissomphalus rakomokoi Nunes, Azevedo & Colombo, 2025
- Dissomphalus ramosus Alencar & Azevedo, 2006
- Dissomphalus ratumaibului Nunes, Azevedo & Colombo, 2025
- Dissomphalus ravuvui Nunes, Azevedo & Colombo, 2025
- Dissomphalus raziogus Brito & Azevedo, 2017
- Dissomphalus rectilineus Azevedo, 1999
- Dissomphalus renbo Mugrabi & Azevedo, 2016
- Dissomphalus refertus Alencar & Azevedo, 2008
- Dissomphalus reshai Colombo, Brito & Azevedo, 2024
- Dissomphalus rettenmeyeri Evans, 1964
- Dissomphalus ritae Brito & Azevedo, 2024
- Dissomphalus roboutei Colombo, Brito & Azevedo, 2026
- Dissomphalus robus Mugrabi & Azevedo, 2013
- Dissomphalus rogali Colombo, Brito & Azevedo, 2026
- Dissomphalus rogovoka Nunes, Azevedo & Colombo, 2025
- Dissomphalus rokrok Mugrabi & Azevedo, 2016
- Dissomphalus rokolai Nunes, Azevedo & Colombo, 2025
- Dissomphalus ros Mugrabi & Azevedo, 2016
- Dissomphalus rosangelae Colombo & Azevedo, 2016
- Dissomphalus rufipalpis Kieffer, 1910
- Dissomphalus rustyi Colombo, Brito & Azevedo, 2024
- Dissomphalus rufipalpis Kieffer, 1910 (Note: D. obliquus is accepted as a junior synonym.)
- Dissomphalus rwindianus Benoit, 1957
- Dissomphalus saci Colombo & Azevedo, 2018
- Dissomphalus sanda Mugrabi & Azevedo, 2016
- Dissomphalus sanguiniusi Colombo, Brito & Azevedo, 2026
- Dissomphalus sartus Brito & Azevedo, 2017
- Dissomphalus saumakii Nunes, Azevedo & Colombo, 2025
- Dissomphalus save Mugrabi & Azevedo, 2016
- Dissomphalus saxatilis Kieffer, 1912
- Dissomphalus scamatus Azevedo, 1999
- Dissomphalus scopatus Redighieri & Azevedo, 2004
- Dissomphalus secretusColombo & Azevedo, 2016
- Dissomphalus serotei Colombo, Brito & Azevedo, 2024
- Dissomphalus setosus Redighieri & Azevedo, 2006
- Dissomphalus sigwelai Colombo, Brito & Azevedo, 2024
- Dissomphalus silveirae Brito & Azevedo, 2024
- Dissomphalus sirsen Mugrabi & Azevedo, 2016
- Dissomphalus sis Mugrabi & Azevedo, 2016
- Dissomphalus sisului Colombo, Brito & Azevedo, 2024
- Dissomphalus sisuluorum Colombo, Brito & Azevedo, 2024
- Dissomphalus slika Mugrabi & Azevedo, 2016
- Dissomphalus sno Mugrabi & Azevedo, 2016
- Dissomphalus sobukwei Colombo, Brito & Azevedo, 2024
- Dissomphalus soklet Mugrabi & Azevedo, 2016
- Dissomphalus solwara Mugrabi & Azevedo, 2016
- Dissomphalus soniae Brito & Azevedo, 2024
- Dissomphalus spissus Redighieri & Azevedo, 2006
- Dissomphalus squirei Colombo, Brito & Azevedo, 2024
- Dissomphalus strabus Azevedo, 2003
- Dissomphalus strepsus Azevedo, 2003
- Dissomphalus subdeformis Azevedo, 2003
- Dissomphalus subpilosus Azevedo, 1999
- Dissomphalus sueliae Brito & Azevedo, 2024
- Dissomphalus suga Mugrabi & Azevedo, 2016
- Dissomphalus susu Mugrabi & Azevedo, 2016
- Dissomphalus strictus Azevedo, 1999
- Dissomphalus switbiskit Mugrabi & Azevedo, 2016
- Dissomphalus switmuli Mugrabi & Azevedo, 2016
- Dissomphalus tabbyi Colombo, Brito & Azevedo, 2024
- Dissomphalus takeii Nunes, Azevedo & Colombo, 2025
- Dissomphalus taiaboku Colombo & Azevedo, 2016
- Dissomphalus tamboi Colombo, Brito & Azevedo, 2024
- Dissomphalus tapiok Mugrabi & Azevedo, 2016
- Dissomphalus taun Mugrabi & Azevedo, 2016
- Dissomphalus teobus Brito & Azevedo, 2017
- Dissomphalus teraus Brito & Azevedo, 2017
- Dissomphalus terbius Brito & Azevedo, 2017
- Dissomphalus terrori Colombo, Brito & Azevedo, 2024
- Dissomphalus thaianus Terayama, 2004
- Dissomphalus thysanus Azevedo, 2003
- Dissomphalus ting Mugrabi & Azevedo, 2016
- Dissomphalus tisa Mugrabi & Azevedo, 2016
- Dissomphalus tisinus Brito & Azevedo, 2017
- Dissomphalus tloomei Colombo, Brito & Azevedo, 2024
- Dissomphalus toitae Colombo, Brito & Azevedo, 2024
- Dissomphalus tokyoi Colombo, Brito & Azevedo, 2024
- Dissomphalus toktok Mugrabi & Azevedo, 2016
- Dissomphalus torem Colombo & Azevedo, 2018
- Dissomphalus triangularis Azevedo, 1999
- Dissomphalus tridentatus Kieffer, 1912
- Dissomphalus trilobatus Redighieri & Azevedo, 2006
- Dissomphalus trisus Brito & Azevedo, 2017
- Dissomphalus truncatus Azevedo, 2003
- Dissomphalus tshukuduae Colombo, Brito & Azevedo, 2024
- Dissomphalus tshwetei Colombo, Brito & Azevedo, 2024
- Dissomphalus tubulatus Redighieri & Azevedo, 2006
- Dissomphalus tudak Mugrabi & Azevedo, 2016
- Dissomphalus tumbuna Mugrabi & Azevedo, 2016
- Dissomphalus tupinikim Colombo & Azevedo, 2016
- Dissomphalus tuberculatus Ashmead, 1894
- Dissomphalus turinus Mugrabi & Azevedo, 2013
- Dissomphalus twebei Colombo, Brito & Azevedo, 2024
- Dissomphalus umaroai Nunes, Azevedo & Colombo, 2025
- Dissomphalus ubracus Brito & Azevedo, 2017
- Dissomphalus undatus Azevedo, 2003
- Dissomphalus unitus Azevedo, 2003
- Dissomphalus urazius Brito & Azevedo, 2017
- Dissomphalus vallensis Evans, 1969
- Dissomphalus vampirus Azevedo, 2003
- Dissomphalus vejayi Colombo, Brito & Azevedo, 2024
- Dissomphalus verrucosus Redighieri & Azevedo, 2004
- Dissomphalus verus Terayama, 2004
- Dissomphalus vulavuka Nunes, Azevedo & Colombo, 2025
- Dissomphalus vulkani Colombo, Brito & Azevedo, 2026
- Dissomphalus vusii Colombo, Brito & Azevedo, 2024
- Dissomphalus w-aedeagus Colombo & Azevedo, 2016
- Dissomphalus wailis Mugrabi & Azevedo, 2016
- Dissomphalus wara Mugrabi & Azevedo, 2016
- Dissomphalus wetliva Mugrabi & Azevedo, 2016
- Dissomphalus wilwil Mugrabi & Azevedo, 2016
- Dissomphalus win Mugrabi & Azevedo, 2016
- Dissomphalus wusheanus Terayama, 2004
- Dissomphalus xanthopus Ashmead, 1893
- Dissomphalus xumae Colombo, Brito & Azevedo, 2024
- Dissomphalus yelo Mugrabi & Azevedo, 2016
- Dissomphalus zedi Colombo, Brito & Azevedo, 2024
- Dissomphalus zephi Colombo, Brito & Azevedo, 2024
- Dissomphalus zethus Mugrabi & Azevedo, 2013
