= Pristocera morawitzi =

Scientific classification
- Kingdom: Animalia
- Phylum: Arthropoda
- Clade: Pancrustacea
- Class: Insecta
- Order: Hymenoptera
- Family: Bethylidae
- Genus: Pristocera
- Species: P. morawitzi

Binomial name
- Pristocera morawitzi Fadeev, 2021

Species of wasp

Pristocera morawitzi is a species of pristocerine wasp in the family Bethylidae found in southern Russia, Azerbaijan, and Armenia. It is active from May to July.

== Etymology ==
The specific epithet is a tribute to Ferdinand Carl Joseph Morawitz, as it was in his collection the species was discovered.
