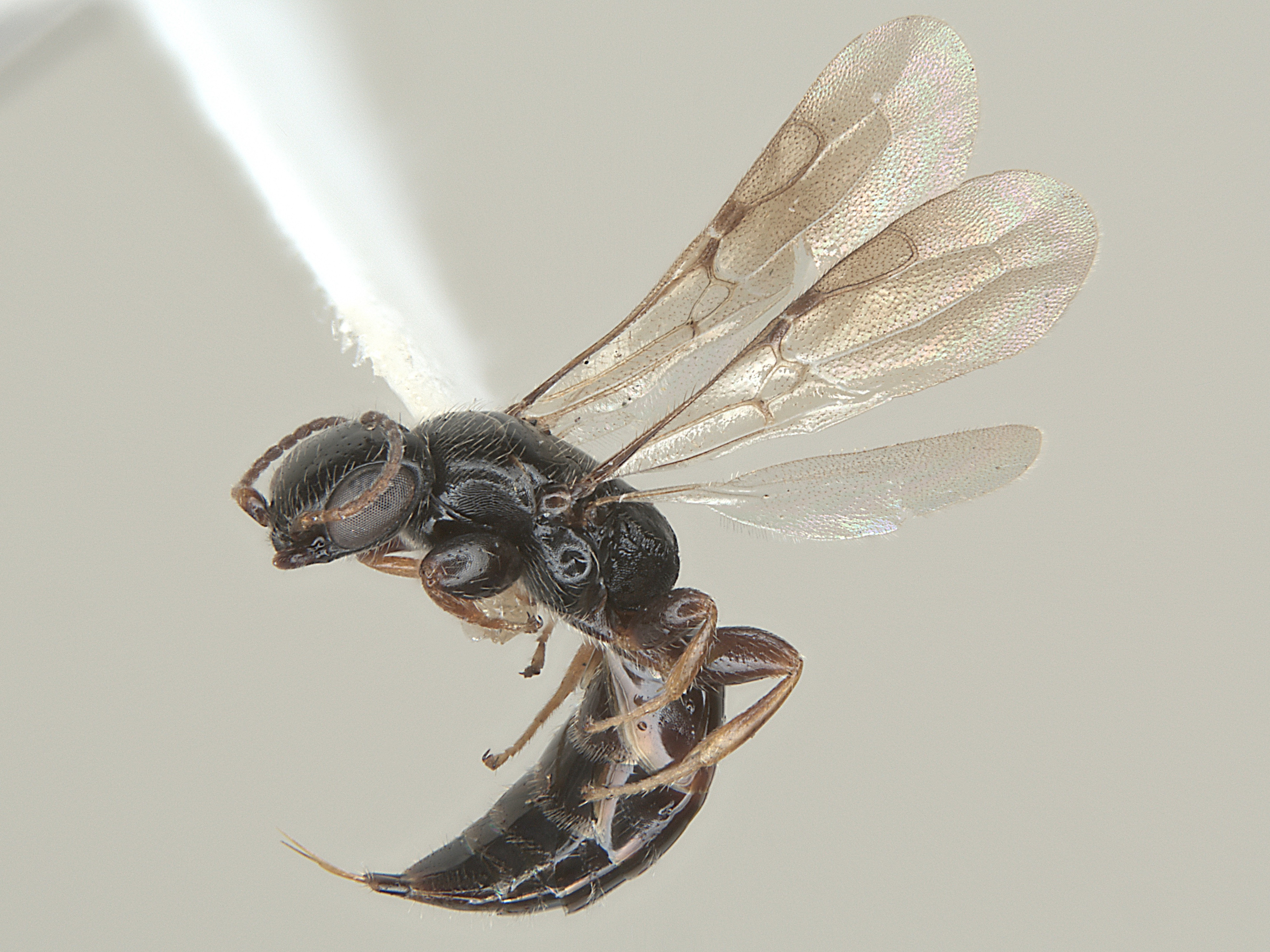

Scientific classification
- Kingdom: Animalia
- Phylum: Arthropoda
- Clade: Pancrustacea
- Class: Insecta
- Order: Hymenoptera
- Family: Bethylidae
- Genus: Sierola
- Species: S. thorpei

Binomial name
- Sierola thorpei Magnacca, 2019

= Sierola thorpei =

Species of wasp

Sierola thorpei is a species of aculeate wasp belonging to the family Bethylidae. The species was first described by Karl N. Magnacca in 2019, and is present in Australia and New Zealand, but may be an exotic species in both territories.

== Taxonomy ==
The species was identified by Karl N. Magnacca in 2019, based on a holotype collected by Stephen E. Thorpe from Glen Innes in Auckland in November 2014 on Lophostemon confertus. Magnacca named the species after Thorpe.

== Description ==
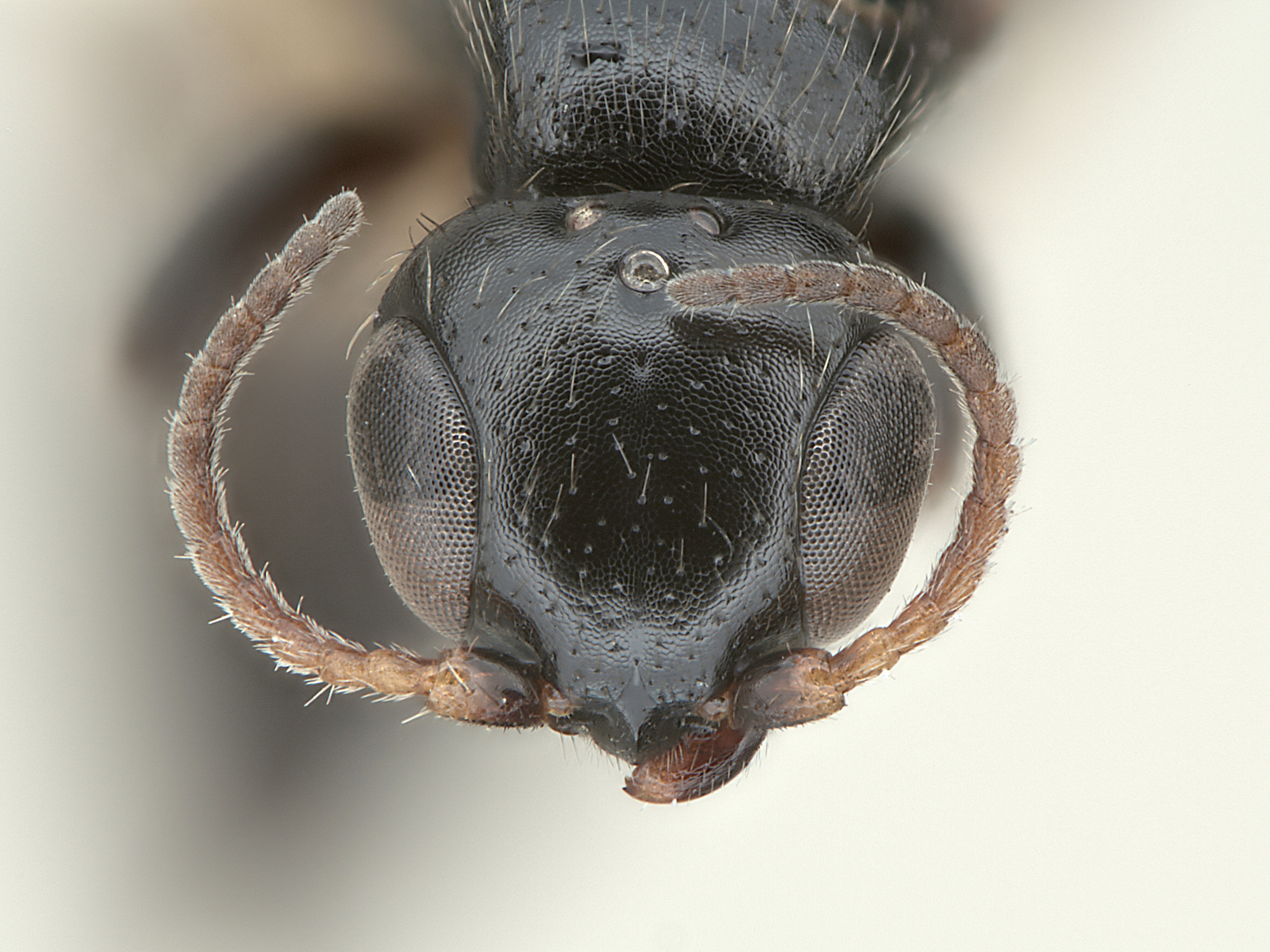
Dorsal view of the head

S. thorpei is dark brown to black in colour. It can be differentiated from other members of Sierola due to its robust build, the short head behind the species' eyes, its infuscate wings and smooth microsculpture.

== Distribution and habitat ==
The species has been found in Canberra, Australia and in Auckland, New Zealand. As the species is known only from modified urban environments, it is likely a species non-native to New Zealand, either originating from Australia, or introduced to both Australia and New Zealand from a third country.
