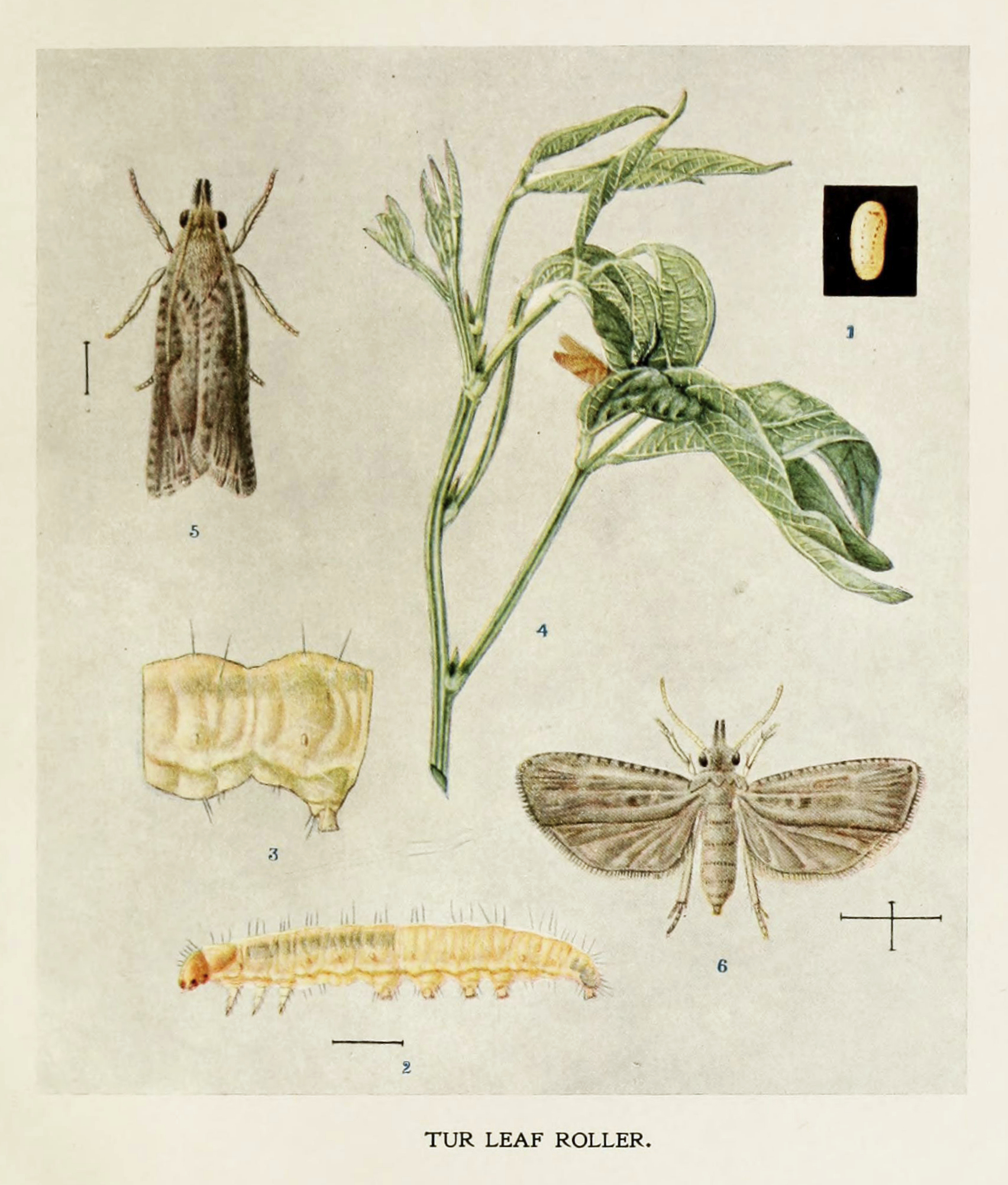

Scientific classification
- Kingdom: Animalia
- Phylum: Arthropoda
- Class: Insecta
- Order: Lepidoptera
- Family: Tortricidae
- Genus: Pammene
- Species: P. critica

Binomial name
- Pammene critica (Meyrick, 1905)

Synonyms
- Eucelis critica Meyrick, 1905; Eucosma ludicra Meyrick, 1912; Eucosma pseudomorpha Meyrick, 1916; Eucosma trichocrossa Meyrick, 1916

= Pammene critica =

Species of moth

Pammene critica, the redgram webber or leaf webber, is a moth of the family Tortricidae. The species was first described by Edward Meyrick in 1905. It is found in India and Sri Lanka.

== Biology ==
The caterpillar is a pale whitish yellow with more yellowish towards its posterior. In the vegetative stage, the caterpillar webs the leaves of the host plant together and feeds inside the web. Apanteles mohandasi is a specific endo-parasitoid on caterpillars.

Larval food plants are Sorghum, Caesalpinia, shoots and seeds of Cajanus cajan and pods of Crotalaria juncea.

== Known predators ==
- Apanteles mohandasi
- Apanteles sauros
- Apanteles taragamae
- Temelucha minuta
- Elasmus albopictus
- Elasmus anticles
- Pediobius cydiae
- Eurytoma sp.
- Protapanteles obliquae
- Goniozus sp.
- Pristomerus microdon
- Copidosoma
- Dolichogenidea molgandasi
