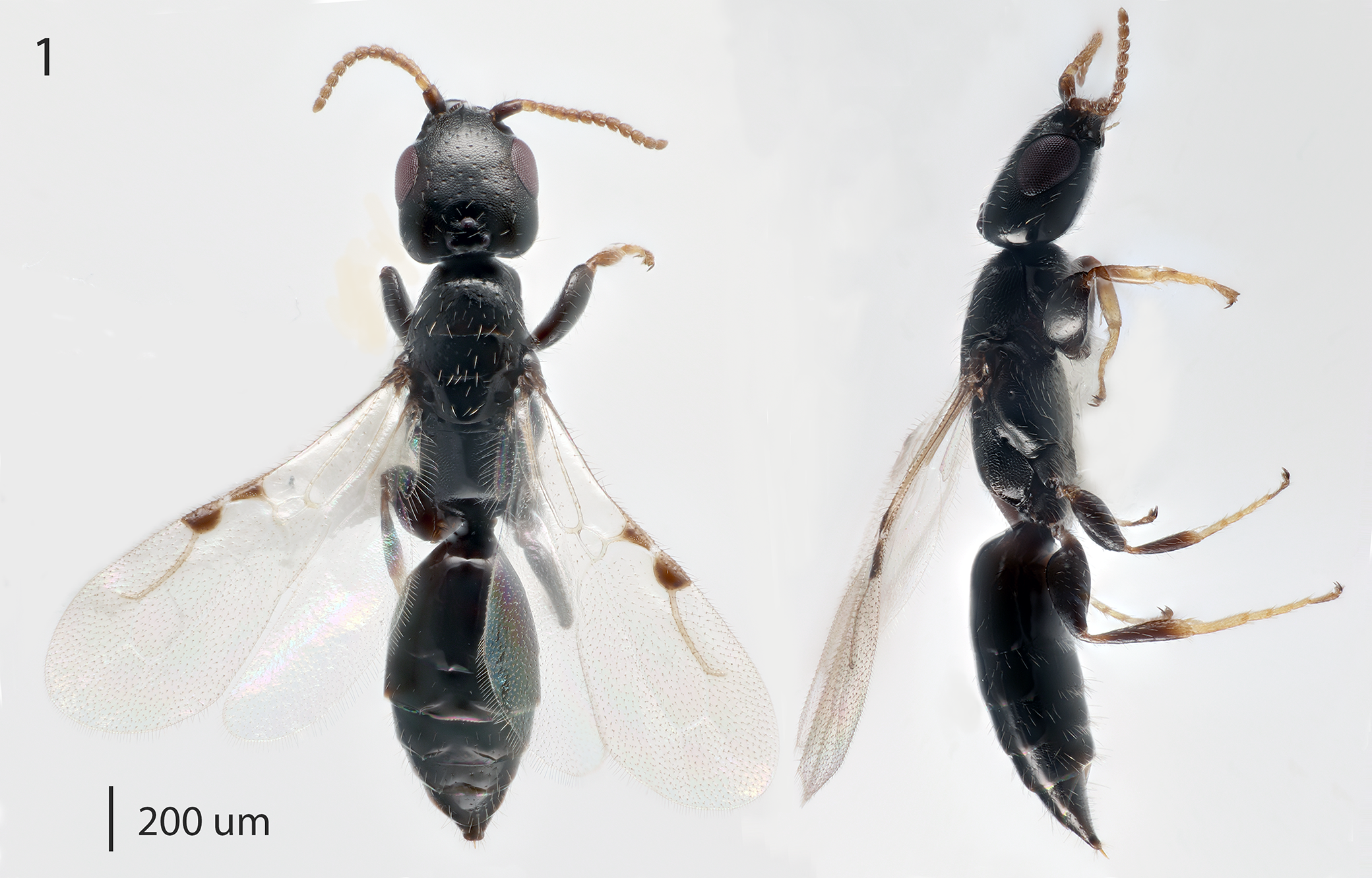

Scientific classification
- Kingdom: Animalia
- Phylum: Arthropoda
- Class: Insecta
- Order: Hymenoptera
- Family: Bethylidae
- Genus: Goniozus
- Species: G. omanensis

Binomial name
- Goniozus omanensis Polaszek, 2019

= Goniozus omanensis =

Species of wasps

Goniozus omanensis is an ectoparasitoid wasp from the Bethylidae family. G. omanensis can be found in Iraq and Oman and is the most prevalent parasitoid of the lesser date moth, which causes significant economic losses. Due to this, it has been researched as a method of biological pest control, but it has not been proven effective.

== Description ==
The length of Goniozus omanensis ranges from 1.73 to 2.83mm. It has a very dark brown body with paler lower legs and antennae. Females can be distinguished from males by their pointed distal metasoma and ovipositor.

== Life cycle ==
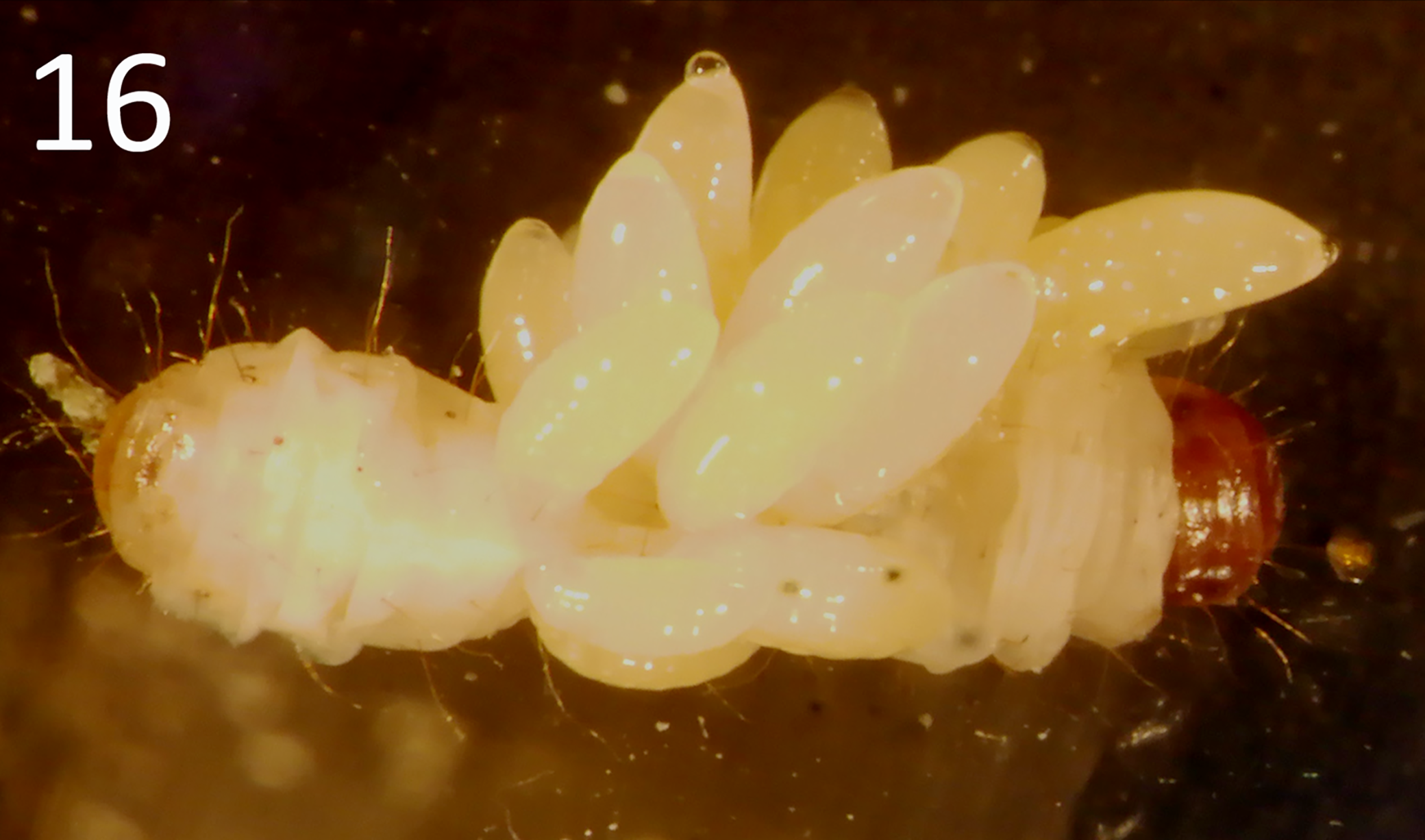
Goniozus omanensis larvae feeding on a Corcyra cephalonica host larva

After mating, female G. omanensis attack and paralyze their prey. They lay their eggs on the skin of the host larvae. After the eggs hatch, they spend 3-4 days feeding on the larvae before spinning a white silky cocoon nearby. After 7-9 days of pupation they emerge from the cocoon and begin to seek out a mate. The lifespan of females is approximately three times longer than males, and typically more females hatch than males. The behavior of host guarding has also been observed, where females that have paralyzed a host will guard it aggressively from other females.
