= Dissomphalus =

Scientific classification
- Kingdom: Animalia
- Phylum: Arthropoda
- Clade: Pancrustacea
- Class: Insecta
- Order: Hymenoptera
- Family: Bethylidae
- Subfamily: Pristocerinae
- Genus: Dissomphalus; Ashmead, 1893

Type species
- Dissomphalus xanthopus Ashmead, 1893

Synonyms
- Parecitopria Oglobin, 1930; Parisobrachium Kieffer, 1914; Psilobethylus Kieffer, 1906; Ecitopria Wasmann, 1899

Genus of flat wasps

Dissomphalus is a genus of flat wasps in the family Bethylidae. The genus is the most species-rich within the family Bethylidae, having 424 species in its genus in 2018.

== Characteristics and taxonomy ==
The genus' species are diurnal and bilaterally symmetric. Its developmental mode is holometabolous. The body is robust and has a clypeus with the median lobe often unidentate or tridentate. The genitalia are short and wide. The harpe is curved inward.

The genus is primarily distinguished in males by a tergal process (metasomal tergal modifications/depressions/tubercles) on the second metasomal segment and a divided aedeagus in the male genitalia consisting of dorsal and ventral valvae.

== Distribution ==
The genus is found worldwide, including Australasian, Nearctic, Neotropical, Afrotropical, Oriental and Palaearctic regions.

== See also ==
- Holepyris
- Sierola
- List of Dissomphalus species
