= Cephalonomia waterstoni =

Scientific classification
- Kingdom: Animalia
- Phylum: Arthropoda
- Class: Insecta
- Order: Hymenoptera
- Family: Bethylidae
- Genus: Cephalonomia
- Species: C. waterstoni

Binomial name
- Cephalonomia waterstoni Gahan, 1931

Species of wasp

Cephalonomia waterstoni, known generally as the parasitic grain wasp or rusty grain beetlewasp, is a species of cuckoo wasp in the family Bethylidae.
