= Pristocera cavigens =

Scientific classification
- Kingdom: Animalia
- Phylum: Arthropoda
- Class: Insecta
- Order: Hymenoptera
- Family: Bethylidae
- Genus: Pristocera
- Species: P. cavigens

Binomial name
- Pristocera cavigens Azevedo, 2025

Species of wasp

Pristocera cavigens is a species of Pristocerine wasp in the family Bethylidae found in India. Only one male and one female specimen have been collected as of 2025.

== Description ==
The male can be distinguished from all other Oriental Pristocera by having foveolate notauli (roughly meaning that the two grooves on the mesoscutum have conspicuous punctures). The female can be recognized by its noticeably large propodeal spiracles. The body length of the male specimen is 10.2 mm and the body length of the female specimen is 6.3 mm.

== Etymology ==
The specific epithet means "to have a cavity" and it refers to the recognizable propodeal spiracles of the female.
