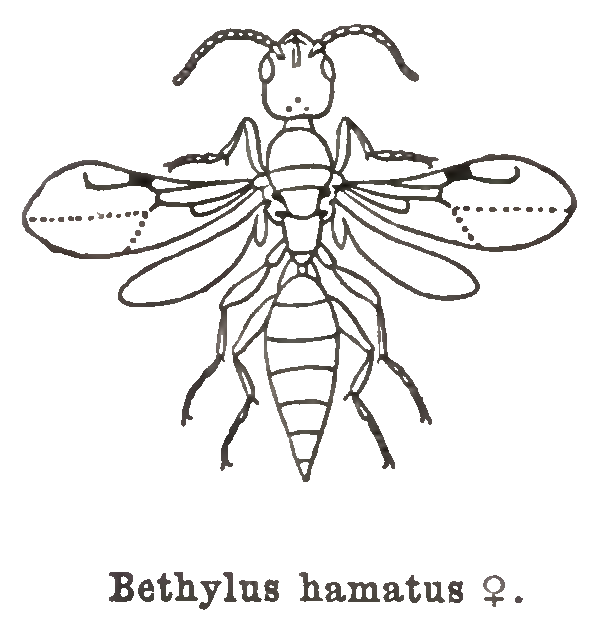
- Bethylus hamatus

Scientific classification
- Kingdom: Animalia
- Phylum: Arthropoda
- Class: Insecta
- Order: Hymenoptera
- Family: Bethylidae
- Genus: Bethylus; Latreille, 1802

Synonyms
- Anoxus Thomson, 1862

= Bethylus =

Genus of insects

Bethylus is a genus of insects belonging to the family Bethylidae.

The species of this genus are found in Europe and North America.

== Species ==
The following species are recognised in the genus Bethylus:

- Bethylus apteryx Kieffer, 1905
- Bethylus berlandi Arlé, 1929
- Bethylus boops (Thomson, 1861)
- Bethylus cenopterus (Panzer, 1801)
- Bethylus cephalotes (Foerster, 1860)
- Bethylus coniceps (Kieffer, 1904)
- Bethylus convexus Wang, He & Chen, 2021
- Bethylus crassicapitis Wang, He & Chen, 2021
- Bethylus dendrophilus Richards, 1939
- Bethylus dubius (Kieffer, 1904)
- Bethylus fuscicornis (Jurine, 1807)
- Bethylus fuscipennis Klug, 1810
- Bethylus gansensis Wang, He & Chen, 2021
- Bethylus gestroi Kieffer, 1904
- Bethylus glabricarinatus Wang, He & Chen, 2021
- Bethylus hemipterus (Panzer, 1801)
- Bethylus hunanensis Wang, He & Chen, 2021
- Bethylus incurvus Wang, He & Chen, 2021
- Bethylus latus Wollaston, 1858
- Bethylus linearis Wollaston, 1858
- Bethylus lineatus Kieffer, 1905
- Bethylus mandibularis (Kieffer, 1904)
- Bethylus ningxicus Wang, He & Chen, 2021
- Bethylus nitidus (Thomson, 1862)
- Bethylus nudipennis Klug, 1810
- Bethylus paradoxus Nagy, 1970
- Bethylus pilosus (Kieffer, 1904)
- Bethylus prolatus Wang, He & Chen, 2021
- Bethylus punctatus Latreille, 1805
- Bethylus quadraticapitis Wang, He & Chen, 2021
- Bethylus ruficornis (Klug, 1810)
- Bethylus sinensis Xu, He & Terayama.A, 2002
- Bethylus struvei Szelenyi, 1941
- Bethylus tenuis Wollaston, 1858
- BOLD:ACT1529 (Bethylus sp.)
