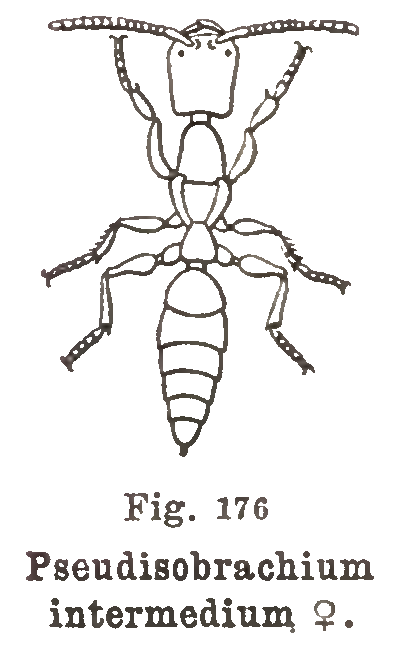

Scientific classification
- Kingdom: Animalia
- Phylum: Arthropoda
- Class: Insecta
- Order: Hymenoptera
- Family: Bethylidae
- Subfamily: Pristocerinae
- Genus: Pseudisobrachium; Kieffer, 1904

= Pseudisobrachium =

Genus of wasps

Pseudisobrachium is a genus of chrysidoid wasps in the family Bethylidae. There are six described species in Pseudisobrachium.

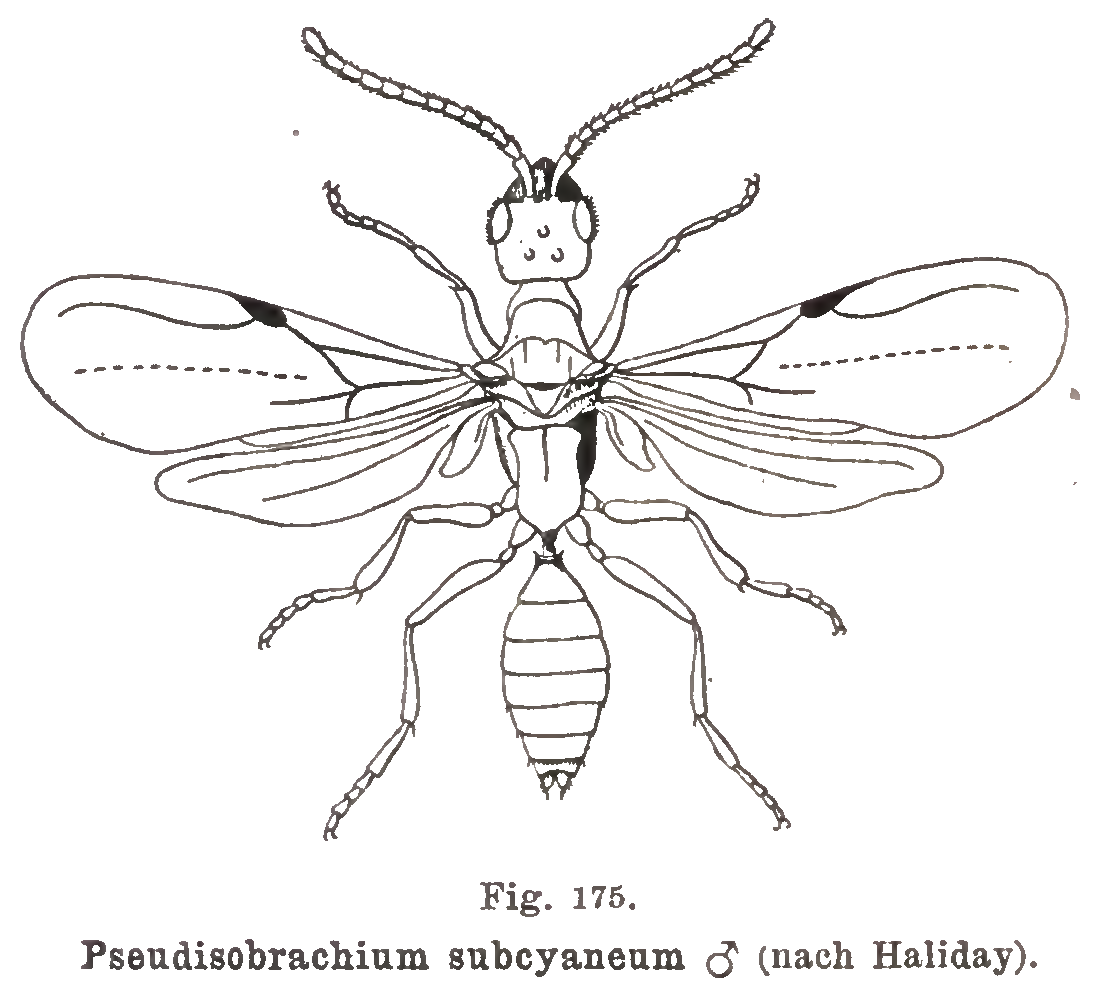

== Species ==
These six species belong to the genus Pseudisobrachium:

- Pseudisobrachium carbonarium^{b}
- Pseudisobrachium fialai Hoffer, 1936^{g}
- Pseudisobrachium intermedium Kieffer, 1904^{g}
- Pseudisobrachium prolongatum^{b}
- Pseudisobrachium pubescens Kieffer, 1906^{g}
- Pseudisobrachium subcyaneum (Haliday, 1838)^{g}

Data sources: i = ITIS, c = Catalogue of Life, g = GBIF, b = Bugguide.net
