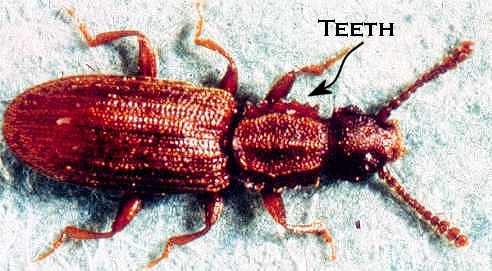
- Oryzaephilus surinamensis

Scientific classification
- Domain: Eukaryota
- Kingdom: Animalia
- Phylum: Arthropoda
- Class: Insecta
- Order: Coleoptera
- Suborder: Polyphaga
- Infraorder: Cucujiformia
- Family: Silvanidae
- Subfamily: Silvaninae
- Genus: Oryzaephilus; Ganglbauer, 1899

= Oryzaephilus =

Genus of beetles

Oryzaephilus is a genus of beetles in the family Silvanidae, containing 16 species:

- Oryzaephilus abeillei Guillebeau
- Oryzaephilus acuminatus Halstead
- Oryzaephilus breuningi Halstead
- Oryzaephilus canus Halstead
- Oryzaephilus cuneatus Halstead
- Oryzaephilus decellei Halstead
- Oryzaephilus exiguus Halstead
- Oryzaephilus fauveli Reitter
- Oryzaephilus genalis Halstead
- Oryzaephilus gibbosus Aitken
- Oryzaephilus mercator Fauvel
- Oryzaephilus mucronatus Halstead
- Oryzaephilus parallelus Halstead
- Oryzaephilus serratus Halstead
- Oryzaephilus socotraensis Halstead
- Oryzaephilus surinamensis Linnaeus
