= Oryzaephilus genalis =

Scientific classification
- Kingdom: Animalia
- Phylum: Arthropoda
- Class: Insecta
- Order: Coleoptera
- Suborder: Polyphaga
- Infraorder: Cucujiformia
- Family: Silvanidae
- Genus: Oryzaephilus
- Species: O. genalis

Binomial name
- Oryzaephilus genalis Halstead, 1980

Species of beetle

Oryzaephilus genalis, is a species of silvan flat bark beetle native to India and Sri Lanka.

== Description ==
Total length of the species is about 2.55 mm. Length of elytra is 1.67 mm.
