= Pristepyris =

Scientific classification
- Kingdom: Animalia
- Phylum: Arthropoda
- Clade: Pancrustacea
- Class: Insecta
- Order: Hymenoptera
- Family: Bethylidae
- Subfamily: Pristocerinae
- Genus: Pristepyris; Kieffer, 1905

Type species
- Pristepyris rugicollis Kieffer, 1905

Synonyms
- Acrepyris Kieffer, 1905

Genus of wasps

Pristepyris is a genus of Pristocerine wasp in the family Bethylidae. It can be found in both the Old World and New World. Members of the genus are ectoparasites of click beetle larvae.

== Species ==
As of 2022, there are 38 species in this genus. A few are included here:

- Pristepyris ishigakiensis (Yasumatsu, 1955)^{c g l}
- Pristepyris masii (Soika, 1933)^{c}
- Pristepyris mieae (Terayama, 1995)^{c g l}
- Pristepyris ryukyuensis (Terayama, 1999)^{c g}
- Pristepyris seqalu Liao, Terayama & Eguchi, 2022^{c g l}
- Pristepyris tainanensis (Terayama, 1995)^{c g l}
- Pristepyris zhejiangensis (Terayama et al., 2002)^{c g l}

Data sources: c = Catalogue of Life, g = GBIF, b = Bugguide.net l = Liao et al. 2022
