= Cephalonomia =

Scientific classification
- Kingdom: Animalia
- Phylum: Arthropoda
- Class: Insecta
- Order: Hymenoptera
- Infraorder: Aculeata
- Superfamily: Chrysidoidea
- Family: Bethylidae
- Subfamily: Epyrinae
- Genus: Cephalonomia; Westwood, 1833

Genus of wasps

Cephalonomia is a genus of parasitoid wasps in the family Bethylidae. There are more than 20 described species in Cephalonomia.

== Species ==
These 27 species belong to the genus Cephalonomia:

- Cephalonomia benoiti Guiglia, 1956
- Cephalonomia brevipennis Kieffer, 1906
- Cephalonomia cursor Westwood, 1881
- Cephalonomia floridana Ashmead
- Cephalonomia formiciformis Westwood, 1833
- Cephalonomia gallicola (Ashmead, 1887)
- Cephalonomia hammi Richards, 1939
- Cephalonomia hirticollis Ashmead
- Cephalonomia hyalinipennis Ashmead, 1893
- Cephalonomia hypobori Kieffer, 1919
- Cephalonomia kiefferi Fouts
- Cephalonomia macrocephala Evans
- Cephalonomia maculata Maneval, 1935
- Cephalonomia mycetophila Kieffer, 1906
- Cephalonomia nidicola Szelenyi, 1944
- Cephalonomia nigrescens Kieffer, 1906
- Cephalonomia nigriventris Masi, 1933
- Cephalonomia nubilipennis Ashmead
- Cephalonomia peregrina Westwood, 1881
- Cephalonomia pinkfloydi Ward, 2013
- Cephalonomia pontina Cerruti, 1957
- Cephalonomia rufa Kieffer, 1906
- Cephalonomia stephanoderis Betrem, 1961
- Cephalonomia tarsalis (Ashmead, 1893)
- Cephalonomia unicolor Fouts, 1935
- Cephalonomia venata Richards, 1939
- Cephalonomia waterstoni Gahan (parasitic grain wasp)
