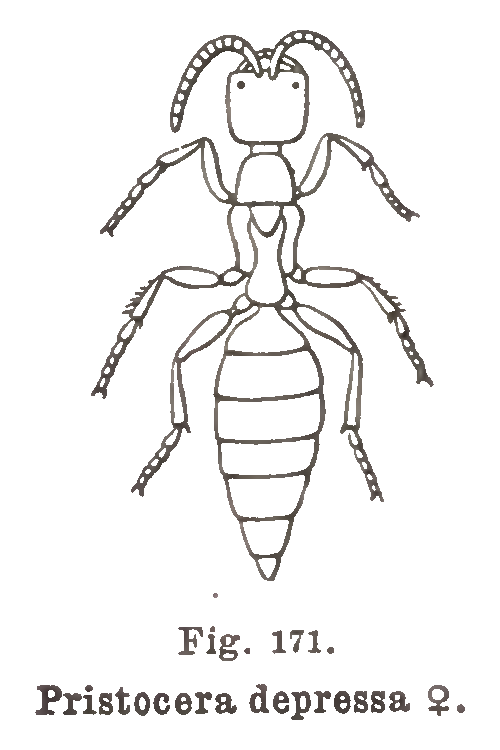

Scientific classification
- Kingdom: Animalia
- Phylum: Arthropoda
- Clade: Pancrustacea
- Class: Insecta
- Order: Hymenoptera
- Family: Bethylidae
- Subfamily: Pristocerinae
- Genus: Pristocera; Klug, 1808

Type species
- Bethylus depressus Fabricius, 1804

Synonyms
- List: Dricrogenium Stadelmann, 1894; Kathepyris Kieffer, 1907; Mangesia Kieffer, 1911; Nomineia Kieffer, 1911; Trichelobrachium Kieffer, 1914; Neodicrogenium Benoit, 1957; Diepyris Benoit, 1957

= Pristocera =

Genus of wasps

Pristocera is an Old World genus of chrysidoid wasps in the family Bethylidae. In the subfamily Pristocerinae, they are somewhat distinctive, as they can be recognized by males having a hypopygium split into two separate plates or the petiolar flaps in females.

== Species ==
These species belong to the genus Pristocera, but more exist:

- Pristocera abdominalis (Turner, 1915)^{z}
- Pristocera aethiopica (Benoit, 1963)^{z}
- Pristocera africana (Kieffer, 1911)^{z}
- Pristocera agraensis (Kurian, 1952)^{a}
- Pristocera alberti (Benoit, 1957)^{z}
- Pristocera albopilosus (Cameron, 1904)^{a}
- Pristocera areolata Muesebeck, 1934
- Pristocera armaticeps (Turner, 1915)^{z}
- Pristocera armifera Say^{b}
- Pristocera aurata (Benoit, 1963)^{z}
- Pristocera basutoense (Benoit, 1982)^{z}
- Pristocera bicarinata (Benoit, 1963)^{z}
- Pristocera brunneus (Benoit, 1957)^{z}
- Pristocera cariana Magretti, 1897^{a}
- Pristocera cavigens Azevedo, 2025^{a}
- Pristocera centrale (Benoit, 1956)^{z}
- Pristocera changmaiensis Terayama & Yamane, 1998^{a}
- Pristocera chirindaense (Benoit, 1963)^{z}
- Pristocera collare (Benoit, 1963)^{z}
- Pristocera commune (Turner, 1915)^{z}
- Pristocera condadti (Stadelmann, 1894)^{z}
- Pristocera congoense (Benoit, 1982)^{z}
- Pristocera depressa (Fabricius, 1804)^{g}
- Pristocera drewsenii Westwood, 1874^{a}
- Pristocera eironeformis Turner, 1914^{a}
- Pristocera elongata (Benoit, 1963)^{z}
- Pristocera formosana Miwa & Sonan, 1935^{g}
- Pristocera fraterna (Acrepyris) fraterna Evans, 1963^{b a}
- Pristocera gigantea (Arle, 1930)^{z}
- Pristocera govindrami Kurian, 1952^{a}
- Pristocera huberi Terayama, 2004^{a}
- Pristocera kinabalensis Terayama & Yamane, 1998^{a}
- Pristocera lembana (Benoit, 1982)^{z}
- Pristocera liberiense (Benoit, 1963)^{z}
- Pristocera masii Soika, 1933^{g}
- Pristocera maxima (Turner, 1917)^{z}
- Pristocera morawitzi Fadeev, 2021
- Pristocera mufungwaense (Benoit, 1963)^{z}
- Pristocera nyassica (Kieffer, 1906)^{z}
- Pristocera orientalis (Cameron, 1888)^{a}
- Pristocera poirieri Terayama, 2004^{a}
- Pristocera puncticeps Fouts, 1930^{a}
- Pristocera rosmara (Stadelmann, 1892)^{z}
- Pristocera rufa Kieffer, 1905^{a}
- Pristocera sampwense (Benoit, 1963)^{z}
- Pristocera sarawakensis Terayama & Yamane, 1998^{a}
- Pristocera schoutedeni (Benoit, 1963)^{z}
- Pristocera sinhalensis Turner, 1928^{a}
- Pristocera spina (Benoit, 1957)^{z}
- Pristocera spinatum (Benoit, 1963)^{z}
- Pristocera spineceps (Masi, 1939)^{z}
- Pristocera spinigera (Turner, 1915)^{z}
- Pristocera sumatrensis Terayama & Yamane, 1998^{a}
- Pristocera superba (Benoit, 1963)^{z}
- Pristocera tangana (Benoit, 1982)^{z}
- Pristocera thermophila (Benoit, 1957)^{z}
- Pristocera uniformis (Benoit, 1982)^{z}
- Pristocera urundiense (Benoit, 1956)^{z}
- Pristocera zata Zamprogno & Azevedo, 2014^{z}
- Pristocera zela Zamprogno & Azevedo, 2014^{z}
- Pristocera zintica Zamprogno & Azevedo, 2014^{z}
- Pristocera zonta Zamprogno & Azevedo, 2014^{z}
- Pristocera zuncra Zamprogno & Azevedo, 2014^{z}

Data sources: i = ITIS, c = Catalogue of Life, g = GBIF, b = Bugguide.net a = Azevedo, 2025 (oriental species only) z = Zamprogno & Azevedo 2014
