= Daucina =

In Fijian mythology (Fiji), Daucina ("torchbearer") is the great god of seafaring Fiji. When Daucina was a toddler, he was only quiet when looking at a lamp. His mother tied fiery reeds to his head so that he would be calm. He has roamed the coral reefs with a hood on ever since. He is a trickster and a patron of adulterers, and a seducer of women. He is known to appear to people in the form of a star or a handsome man.
