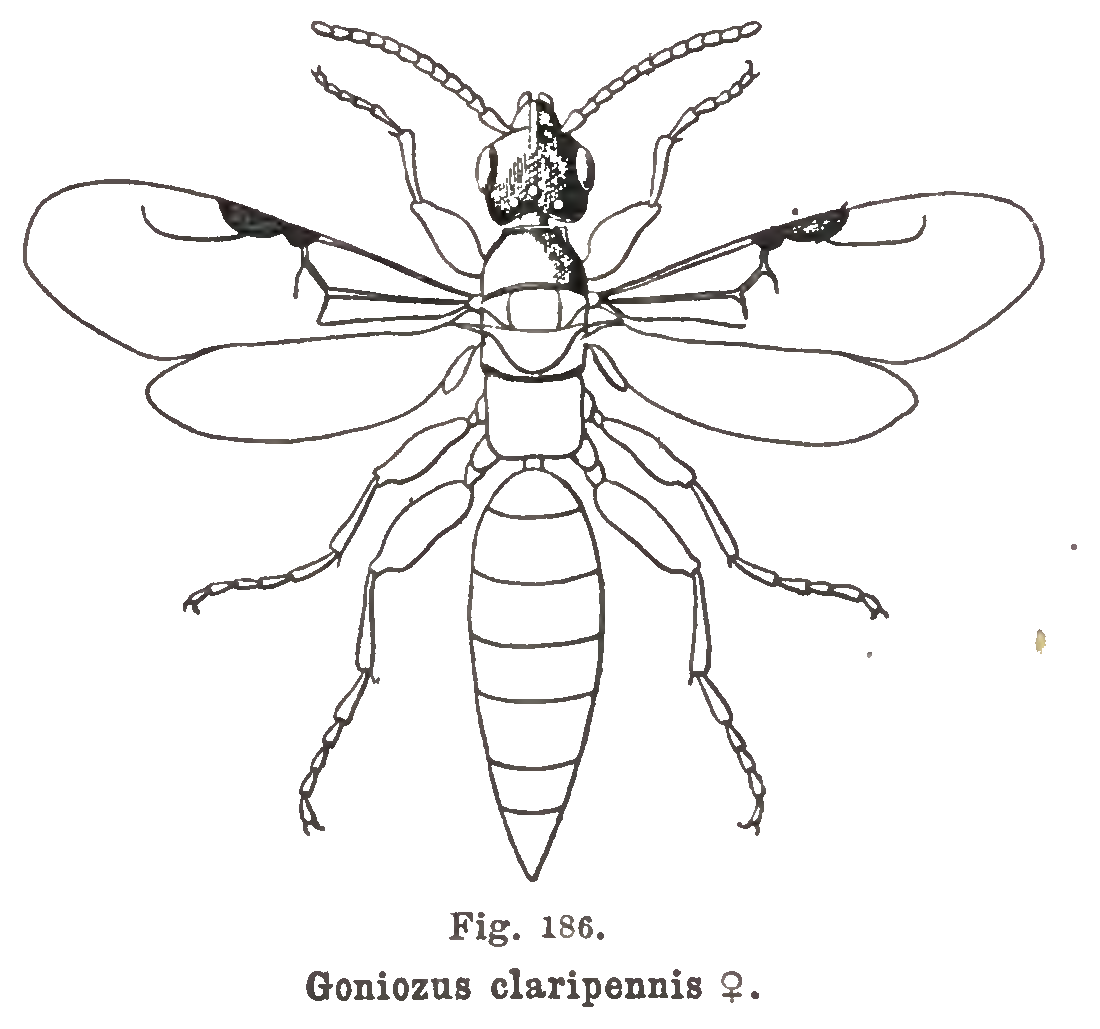

Scientific classification
- Kingdom: Animalia
- Phylum: Arthropoda
- Class: Insecta
- Order: Hymenoptera
- Family: Bethylidae
- Subfamily: Bethylinae
- Genus: Goniozus; Förster, 1856

= Goniozus =

Genus of wasps

Goniozus is a genus of parasitic wasps in the family Bethylidae. There are at least 20 described species in Goniozus.

== Species ==
These 26 species belong to the genus Goniozus:

- Goniozus akitsushimanus Terayama, 2006^{g}
- Goniozus antiquus Barbosa & Melo, 2023^{g}
- Goniozus asperulus Evans, 1978^{b}
- Goniozus claripennis Foerster, 1851^{g}
- Goniozus disjunctus Kieffer, 1926^{g}
- Goniozus distigmus Thomson, 1862^{g}
- Goniozus gallicola Kieffer, 1905^{g}
- Goniozus gestroi Kieffer, 1904^{g}
- Goniozus inauditus Santhosh^{g}
- Goniozus indicus Ashmead, 1903^{g}
- Goniozus jacintae Farrugia, 1971^{c g}
- Goniozus japonicus Maa, 1904^{g}
- Goniozus jamiei Ward, 2013^{g}
- Goniozus koreanus Lim^{g}
- Goniozus kuriani Santhosh^{g}
- Goniozus legneri Gordh, 1982^{b} (Goniozus navel orangeworm wasp)
- Goniozus maurus Marshall, 1905^{g}
- Goniozus mesolevis Lim^{g}
- Goniozus mobilis Foerster, 1860^{g}
- Goniozus musae Ward, 2013^{g}
- Goniozus omanensis Polaszek, 2019^{g}
- Goniozus plugarui Nagy, 1976^{g}
- Goniozus punctatus Kieffer, 1914^{g}
- Goniozus tibialis Vollenhoven, 1878^{g}
- Goniozus yoshikawai Terayama, 2006^{g}
- Goniozus nephantidis

Data sources: i = ITIS, c = Catalogue of Life, g = GBIF, b = Bugguide.net
