= Holepyris =

Scientific classification
- Kingdom: Animalia
- Phylum: Arthropoda
- Class: Insecta
- Order: Hymenoptera
- Family: Bethylidae
- Genus: Holepyris; Kieffer, 1904

Genus of wasps

Holepyris is a genus of hymenopteran parasitoids in the family Bethylidae. These species use small beetle larvae as hosts for their larvae. Prior to a 2022 study that found this genus and other genera within the subfamily Epyrinae to be polyphyletic, there were 148 species in the genus Holepyris. Following a reclassification aiming at creating monophyletic genera of Epyrinae, 131 Holepyris species were placed in the genus Rysepyris (including Holepyris sylvanidis, now Rysepyris sylvanidis, a species studied as a biocontrol agent of some storage pests), and three Formosiepyris species were placed in the genus Holepyris. As a result, there are now 23 species in the genus Holepyris:

== Species ==
- Holepyris africanus Kieffer, 19041
- Holepyris agraensis (Kurian, 1955)
- Holepyris algoaensis Kieffer, 1911
- Holepyris angusticollis Kieffer, 1906
- Holepyris bergevini Duchaussoy, 1916[1914]
- Holepyris bidentatus Kieffer, 1904
- Holepyris crenulatus Kieffer, 1906
- Holepyris fasciipennis Kieffer, 1906
- Holepyris fuscipennis Kieffer, 1906
- Holepyris levicollis Kieffer, 1906
- Holepyris lineatus Kieffer, 1906
- Holepyris maculipennis (Marshall, 1874)
- Holepyris marishi (Terayama, 2004)
- Holepyris natalensis Kieffer, 1913
- Holepyris orientalis Kieffer, 1906
- Holepyris punctaticollis Kieffer, 1906
- Holepyris rufitarsis Kieffer, 1906
- Holepyris rugulosus (Xu & He, 2005)
- Holepyris shiva (Terayama, 2004)
- Holepyris sylvanidis (Brèthes, 1913)
- Holepyris takasago (Terayama, 2004)
- Holepyris tibialis Kieffer, 1906
- Holepyris vietnamensis (Tsujii et al., 2015)
- Holepyris vittatus Turner, 1928
