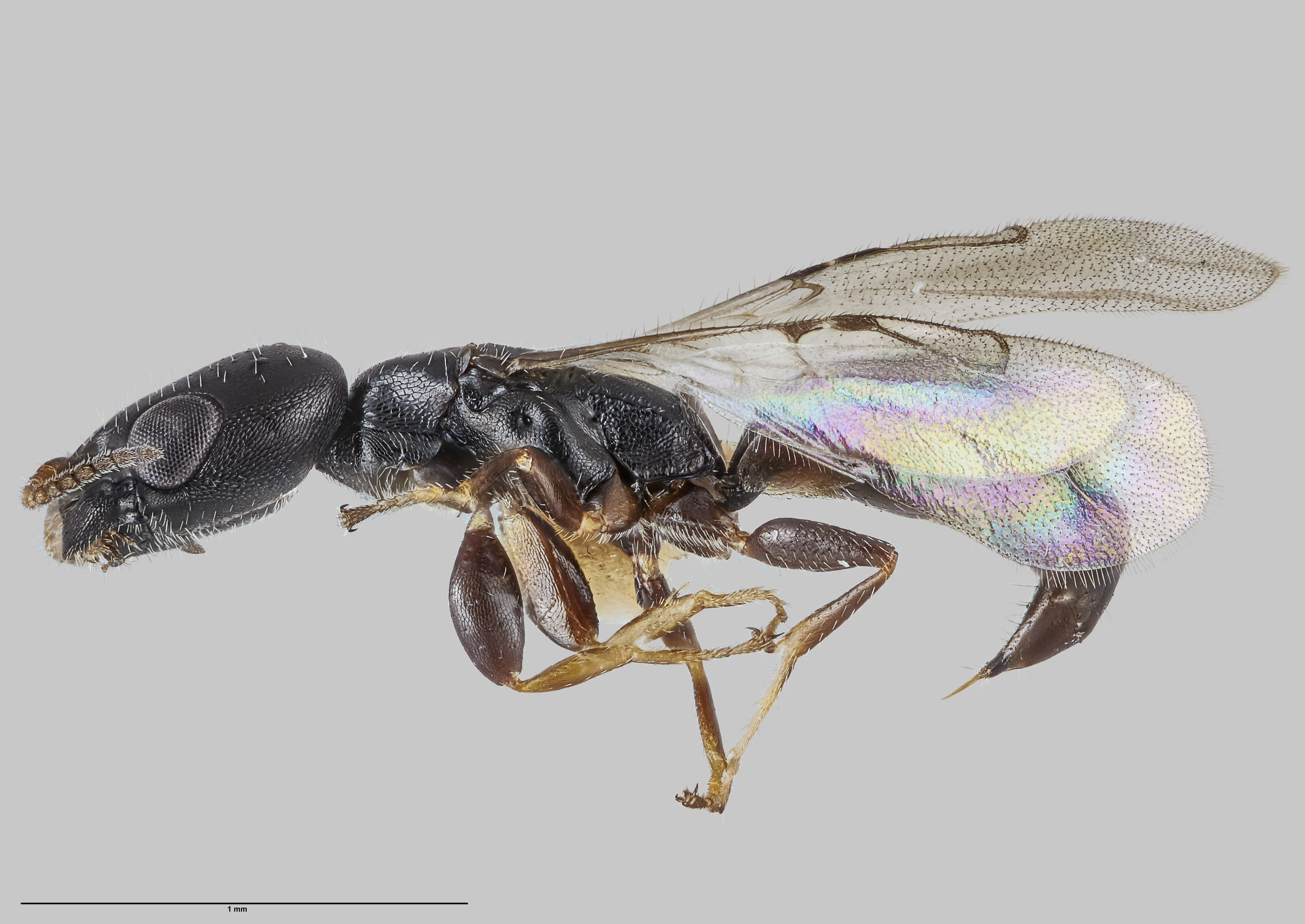
- Sierola gilbertae

Scientific classification
- Domain: Eukaryota
- Kingdom: Animalia
- Phylum: Arthropoda
- Class: Insecta
- Order: Hymenoptera
- Family: Bethylidae
- Subfamily: Bethylinae
- Genus: Sierola; Cameron, 1881

Species
- See text

= Sierola =

Genus of aculeate wasp

Sierola is a genus of aculeate wasps belonging to the family Bethylidae. The genus was described by British entomologist Peter Cameron in 1881.

== Taxonomy ==
Cameron described the species in 1881, naming Sierola testaceipes as the type species.

== Distribution ==
The genus has a cosmopolitan distribution.

== Species ==
- Sierola abusa Fullaway, 1920
- Sierola acuta Fullaway, 1920
- Sierola adamsoni Fullaway, 1934
- Sierola adumbrata Fullaway, 1920
- Sierola affinis Fullaway, 1920
- Sierola agens Fullaway, 1920
- Sierola akahikina Magnacca, 2020
- Sierola alala Magnacca, 2020
- Sierola alba Magnacca, 2020
- Sierola alelo Magnacca, 2020
- Sierola amica Fullaway, 1920
- Sierola anemophila Fullaway, 1920
- Sierola angustata Fullaway, 1920
- Sierola aniani Magnacca, 2020
- Sierola anthracina Fullaway, 1920
- Sierola arida Fullaway, 1920
- Sierola aristoteliae Fullaway, 1920
- Sierola armata Fullaway, 1920
- Sierola arpactes Magnacca, 2020
- Sierola aspera Fullaway, 1920
- Sierola atra Fullaway, 1920
- Sierola aucta Fullaway, 1920
- Sierola auwae Magnacca, 2020
- Sierola balteata Magnacca, 2020
- Sierola batrachedrae Fullaway, 1920
- Sierola beardsleyi Magnacca, 2020
- Sierola bella Fullaway, 1920
- Sierola berryae Ward, 2013
- Sierola bicolor Fullaway, 1920
- Sierola blackburni Fullaway, 1920
- Sierola brevicaputa Wang, He & Chen, 2021
- Sierola brevicauda Fullaway, 1920
- Sierola breviceps Fullaway, 1920
- Sierola brevicornis Fullaway, 1920
- Sierola bridwelli Fullaway, 1920
- Sierola brunnea Fullaway, 1920
- Sierola brunneipennis Fullaway, 1920
- Sierola brunneipes Fullaway, 1920
- Sierola brunneiventris Fullaway, 1920
- Sierola bryani Fullaway, 1934
- Sierola callida Fullaway, 1920
- Sierola canuta Magnacca, 2020
- Sierola capuana Fullaway, 1920
- Sierola carinata Fullaway, 1920
- Sierola celeris Fullaway, 1920
- Sierola centralis Magnacca, 2020
- Sierola citripoda Magnacca, 2020
- Sierola collaris Ashmead, 1901
- Sierola compacta Fullaway, 1920
- Sierola concava Magnacca, 2020
- Sierola conspicua Fullaway, 1920
- Sierola cookei Fullaway, 1934
- Sierola croceipes Fullaway, 1920
- Sierola cryptophlebiae Fullaway, 1920
- Sierola curiosa Fullaway, 1920
- Sierola curvata Magnacca, 2020
- Sierola curvignatha Fullaway, 1920
- Sierola danimalis Magnacca, 2020
- Sierola depressa Fullaway, 1920
- Sierola depressella Fullaway, 1920
- Sierola dichroma Perkins, 1910
- Sierola discoides Magnacca, 2020
- Sierola distincta Fullaway, 1920
- Sierola distinguenda Fullaway, 1920
- Sierola ehrhorni Fullaway, 1920
- Sierola emarginata Fullaway, 1920
- Sierola epagogeana Fullaway, 1920
- Sierola eucrena Fullaway, 1920
- Sierola extensa Magnacca, 2020
- Sierola femoralis Magnacca, 2020
- Sierola flavicornis Fullaway, 1920
- Sierola flavipennis Fullaway, 1920
- Sierola flavipes Fullaway, 1920
- Sierola flavocollaris Ashmead, 1901
- Sierola fossulata Fullaway, 1920
- Sierola freycinetiae Fullaway, 1934
- Sierola fuliginosa Fullaway, 1920
- Sierola fusca Fullaway, 1920
- Sierola fuscipennis Fullaway, 1920
- Sierola fuscipes Fullaway, 1920
- Sierola giffardi Fullaway, 1920
- Sierola gilbertae Ward, 2013
- Sierola glabra Fullaway, 1920
- Sierola gracilariae Fullaway, 1920
- Sierola gracilis Fullaway, 1920
- Sierola gracillima Fullaway, 1920
- Sierola granulosa Magnacca, 2020
- Sierola gregoryi Fullaway, 1934
- Sierola halona Magnacca, 2020
- Sierola hastata Sorg, 1988
- Sierola hauwahine Magnacca, 2020
- Sierola heterochroma Magnacca, 2020
- Sierola hiiaka Magnacca, 2020
- Sierola hillebrandi Fullaway, 1920
- Sierola hirsuta Fullaway, 1920
- Sierola hirticeps Fullaway, 1920
- Sierola hivaoaensis Fullaway, 1934
- Sierola holomelaena Fullaway, 1920
- Sierola hookahi Magnacca, 2020
- Sierola houdiniae Magnacca, 2019
- Sierola hualala Magnacca, 2020
- Sierola huapoo Magnacca, 2020
- Sierola huikau Magnacca, 2020
- Sierola humilis Fullaway, 1920
- Sierola ihulena Magnacca, 2020
- Sierola illingworthi Fullaway, 1920
- Sierola imparata Fullaway, 1920
- Sierola incita Fullaway, 1920
- Sierola indecora Fullaway, 1920
- Sierola kaala Fullaway, 1920
- Sierola kaalensis Fullaway, 1920
- Sierola kaduana Fullaway, 1920
- Sierola kahuku Magnacca, 2020
- Sierola kalihiensis Fullaway, 1920
- Sierola kamani Magnacca, 2020
- Sierola kauaiensis Ashmead, 1901
- Sierola kauensis Fullaway, 1920
- Sierola kaumuohona Fullaway, 1920
- Sierola kawala Magnacca, 2020
- Sierola kepau Magnacca, 2020
- Sierola kikiwi Magnacca, 2020
- Sierola kilauea Fullaway, 1920
- Sierola kilohana Magnacca, 2020
- Sierola koa Fullaway, 1920
- Sierola koebelei Fullaway, 1920
- Sierola kolea Magnacca, 2020
- Sierola koloa Magnacca, 2020
- Sierola komohana Magnacca, 2020
- Sierola konana Fullaway, 1920
- Sierola koolauensis Fullaway, 1920
- Sierola kumene Magnacca, 2020
- Sierola kumumu Magnacca, 2020
- Sierola kunihi Magnacca, 2020
- Sierola lacessita Fullaway, 1920
- Sierola langfordi Fullaway, 1920
- Sierola lanihuliana Fullaway, 1920
- Sierola lapuu Magnacca, 2020
- Sierola lata Fullaway, 1920
- Sierola lateralis Magnacca, 2020
- Sierola laticeps Fullaway, 1920
- Sierola laupapa Magnacca, 2020
- Sierola lebronnecii Fullaway, 1934
- Sierola leiocephala Magnacca, 2020
- Sierola leleji Wang, He & Chen, 2021
- Sierola lepida Fullaway, 1920
- Sierola leuconeura Blackburn & Cameron, 1886
- Sierola levigata Fullaway, 1920
- Sierola levis Fullaway, 1920
- Sierola limatulifascia Wang, He & Chen, 2021
- Sierola localis Fullaway, 1920
- Sierola longicaudata Fullaway, 1920
- Sierola longiceps Fullaway, 1920
- Sierola longicornis Fullaway, 1920
- Sierola lucyae Ward, 2013
- Sierola lugens Fullaway, 1920
- Sierola luteipes Fullaway, 1920
- Sierola magna Fullaway, 1920
- Sierola mahiai Magnacca, 2020
- Sierola mahoe Magnacca, 2020
- Sierola makaha Magnacca, 2020
- Sierola malino Magnacca, 2020
- Sierola mandibularis Fullaway, 1920
- Sierola mandibulata Fullaway, 1920
- Sierola manoa Fullaway, 1920
- Sierola manono Magnacca, 2020
- Sierola mauiensis Fullaway, 1920
- Sierola megalognatha Fullaway, 1920
- Sierola megalops Fullaway, 1920
- Sierola minuscula Fullaway, 1920
- Sierola minuta Fullaway, 1920
- Sierola molokaiensis Ashmead, 1901
- Sierola montana Fullaway, 1920
- Sierola monticola Blackburn & Cameron, 1886
- Sierola muiri Fullaway, 1920
- Sierola mumfordi Fullaway, 1934
- Sierola nemorensis Fullaway, 1920
- Sierola neoarmata Magnacca, 2020
- Sierola newelli Fullaway, 1920
- Sierola nigra Fullaway, 1920
- Sierola nigrans Fullaway, 1920
- Sierola nigrescens Fullaway, 1920
- Sierola nigrita Fullaway, 1920
- Sierola nihopeku Magnacca, 2020
- Sierola nitens Fullaway, 1920
- Sierola nitida Fullaway, 1920
- Sierola notabilis Fullaway, 1920
- Sierola nubila Fullaway, 1920
- Sierola nuda Fullaway, 1920
- Sierola nuku Magnacca, 2020
- Sierola oahuensis Ashmead, 1901
- Sierola obscura Fullaway, 1920
- Sierola olena Magnacca, 2020
- Sierola olinda Fullaway, 1920
- Sierola olympiana Fullaway, 1920
- Sierola ooumuana Fullaway, 1934
- Sierola opaeula Fullaway, 1920
- Sierola opogonae Fullaway, 1920
- Sierola osborni Fullaway, 1920
- Sierola pakela Magnacca, 2020
- Sierola pano Magnacca, 2020
- Sierola peleana Fullaway, 1920
- Sierola peleleu Magnacca, 2020
- Sierola pembertoni Fullaway, 1920
- Sierola perkinsi Fullaway, 1920
- Sierola perottetiae Fullaway, 1920
- Sierola philodoriae Fullaway, 1920
- Sierola picea Fullaway, 1920
- Sierola pilifera Fullaway, 1920
- Sierola pilosa Fullaway, 1920
- Sierola pipturi Magnacca, 2020
- Sierola planiceps Fullaway, 1920
- Sierola poepoe Magnacca, 2020
- Sierola polita Fullaway, 1920
- Sierola poohiwi Magnacca, 2020
- Sierola proxima Fullaway, 1920
- Sierola psaliphora Magnacca, 2020
- Sierola pubescens Fullaway, 1920
- Sierola puiwa Magnacca, 2020
- Sierola pulchra Fullaway, 1920
- Sierola punctata Fullaway, 1920
- Sierola puuwaawaa Fullaway, 1920
- Sierola pygmaea Fullaway, 1920
- Sierola quadriceps Fullaway, 1920
- Sierola robusta Fullaway, 1920
- Sierola rocki Fullaway, 1920
- Sierola rostrata Magnacca, 2020
- Sierola rovniana Ramos & Azevedo, 2014
- Sierola rufignatha Fullaway, 1920
- Sierola rufomandibulata Fullaway, 1920
- Sierola rugiventris Magnacca, 2020
- Sierola rugulosa Fullaway, 1920
- Sierola scoriacea Fullaway, 1920
- Sierola seminigra Fullaway, 1920
- Sierola sericea Fullaway, 1920
- Sierola setosa Fullaway, 1920
- Sierola sima Fullaway, 1920
- Sierola similaris Fullaway, 1920
- Sierola similis Fullaway, 1920
- Sierola sinensis Fullaway, 1920
- Sierola spicata Fullaway, 1920
- Sierola streblognatha Fullaway, 1920
- Sierola striata Fullaway, 1920
- Sierola subcrispa Fullaway, 1920
- Sierola suttoniae Fullaway, 1920
- Sierola swezeyi Fullaway, 1920
- Sierola tahuataensis Fullaway, 1934
- Sierola tantalea Fullaway, 1920
- Sierola tauraaiana Fullaway, 1934
- Sierola tenebriosa Fullaway, 1920
- Sierola tenuiceps Fullaway, 1920
- Sierola tenuis Fullaway, 1920
- Sierola testaceipes Cameron, 1881
- Sierola thorpei Magnacca, 2019
- Sierola timberlakei Fullaway, 1920
- Sierola tuberculata Fullaway, 1920
- Sierola tumidoventris Fullaway, 1920
- Sierola uhiwai Magnacca, 2020
- Sierola urerae Magnacca, 2020
- Sierola usitata Fullaway, 1920
- Sierola vestita Fullaway, 1920
- Sierola vetusta Fullaway, 1920
- Sierola vibrissata Ward, 2013
- Sierola vicina Magnacca, 2020
- Sierola vitiensis Fullaway, 1920
- Sierola volcanica Fullaway, 1920
- Sierola vulcana Fullaway, 1920
- Sierola waianaeana Fullaway, 1920
- Sierola weawea Magnacca, 2020
- Sierola wehe Magnacca, 2020
- Sierola welau Magnacca, 2020
- Sierola willardi Fullaway, 1920
- Sierola williamsi Fullaway, 1920
- Sierola xanthodera Magnacca, 2020
- Sierola yoshimotoi Magnacca, 2020
