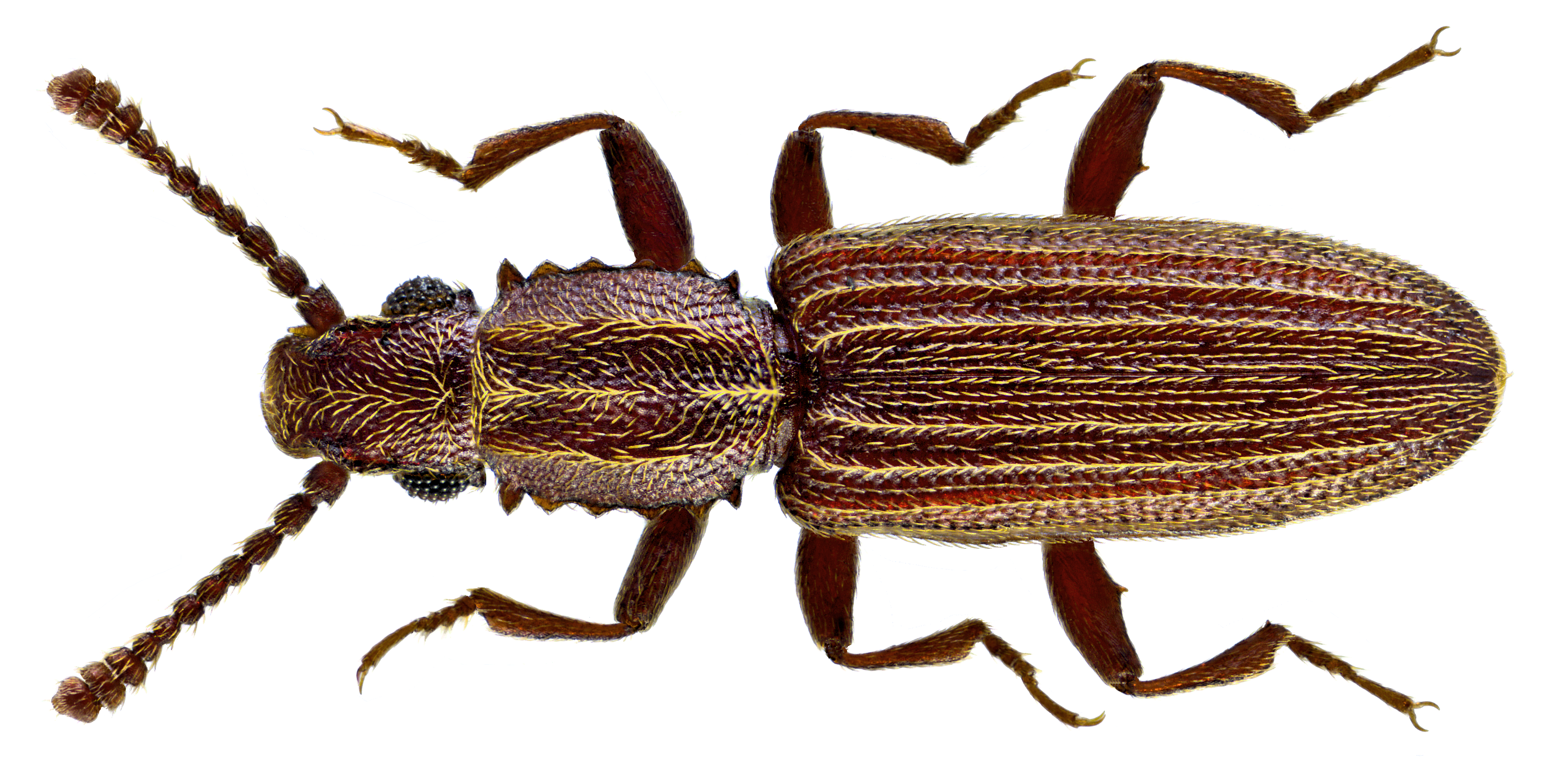

Scientific classification
- Kingdom: Animalia
- Phylum: Arthropoda
- Clade: Pancrustacea
- Class: Insecta
- Order: Coleoptera
- Suborder: Polyphaga
- Infraorder: Cucujiformia
- Family: Silvanidae
- Genus: Oryzaephilus
- Species: O. mercator

Binomial name
- Oryzaephilus mercator (Fauvel, 1889)

= Oryzaephilus mercator =

Species of beetle

Oryzaephilus mercator, the merchant grain beetle, is a small, flattened beetle about 2.5mm in length. It is a common, worldwide pest of grain and grain products as well as fruit, chocolate, drugs, and tobacco. The biology of O. mercator is nearly identical with Oryzaephilus surinamensis (the sawtooth grain beetle). It can be differentiated from O. surinamensis by its larger eyes and by the shape of the head, the area just behind the eyes of O. mercator is narrower than that of O. surinamensis, which has a more triangular shaped head. Unlike O. surinamensis, adults are capable of flight.

== Life cycle ==
Females produce from 500 to 1000 eggs in a year which are deposited within a food source. The larvae are yellowish-white with a brown head and can reach a length of up to 3mm, larvae are active and move about through a food source as they feed. Larvae molt two to four times before pupating in a cocoon-like structure made by joining together small grain kernels and pieces of kernels. The total life cycle takes approximately 27–50 days.

== As a stored grain pest ==
Oryzaephilus mercator is one of the most commonly encountered pests in grain and grain products, and will feed on any foodstuffs of vegetable origin. Broken grain kernels are the principal food source but whole kernels may be penetrated and fed on. This feeding results in the destruction of grain (shrinkage). Further, the metabolism of a population of insects results in an increase of water absorption into the grain, which can cause mold growth.

== Control ==
In commercial grain storage operations bins should be cleaned after emptying in order to prevent any insects from infesting new grain. Fumigation can be used to eliminate infestations, and grain stored more than 6 months may need an application of pesticide to prevent infestation. The fumigants used for control of insects in grain do not leave a residue when used properly but are highly toxic and require a qualified pesticide applicator.

In the home, products susceptible to infection should be kept in sealed containers to exclude these beetles. Freezing infested foodstuffs at -18 °C for six days will kill all stages of the O. mercator life cycle. Infestations always center around a food source used for breeding and the identification and removal of all infested foodstuffs will eliminate the population.
