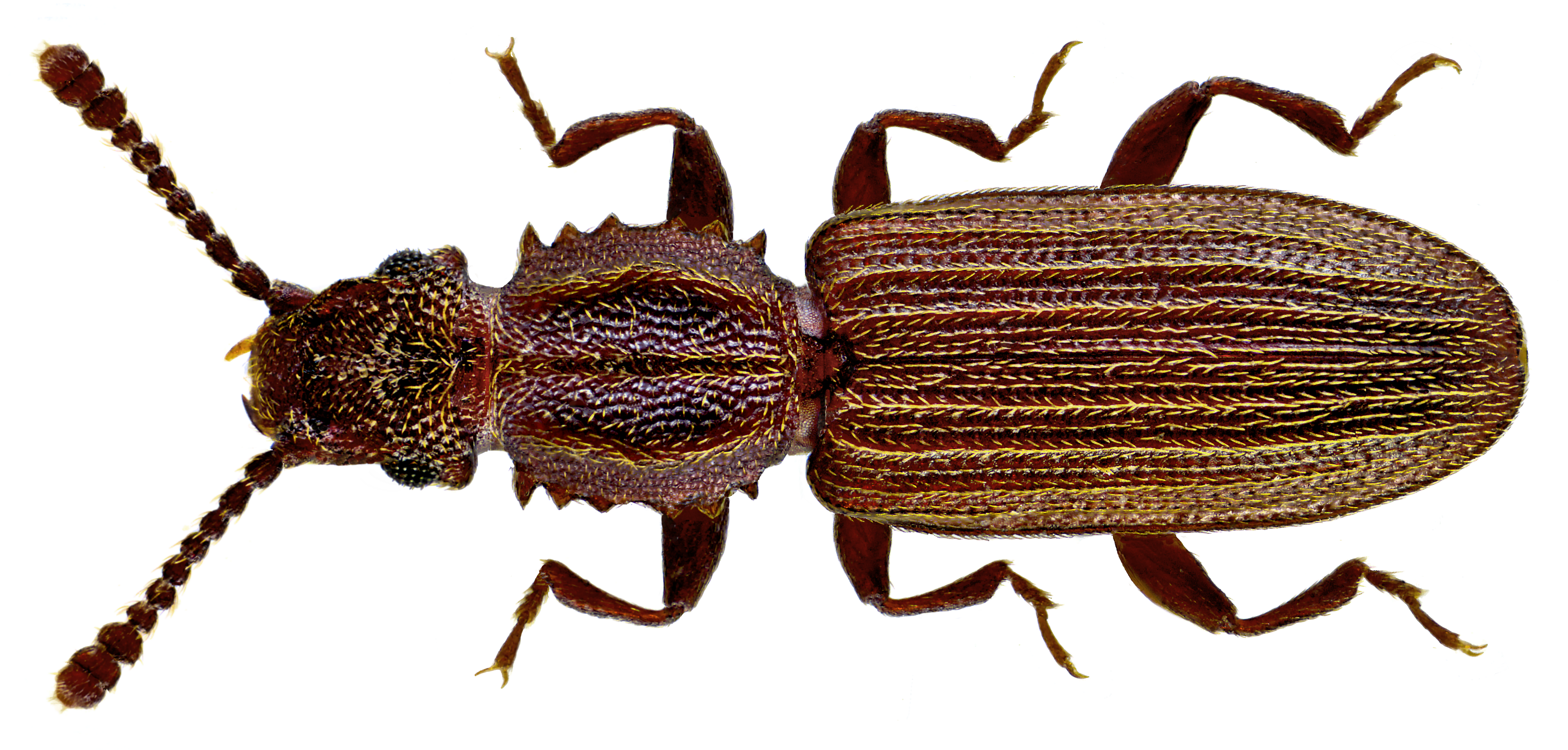

Scientific classification
- Kingdom: Animalia
- Phylum: Arthropoda
- Clade: Pancrustacea
- Class: Insecta
- Order: Coleoptera
- Suborder: Polyphaga
- Infraorder: Cucujiformia
- Family: Silvanidae
- Genus: Oryzaephilus
- Species: O. surinamensis

Binomial name
- Oryzaephilus surinamensis (Linnaeus, 1758)

Synonyms
- Anobium frumentarium Fabricius, 1775; Dermestes sexdentatus Fabricius, 1792; Dermestes surinamensis Linnaeus, 1758; Ips frumentaria (Fabricius, 1775); Ips sexdentatus Herbst, 1783; Oryzaephilus cursor (Fabricius, 1792); Oryzaephilus frumentarius (Fabricius, 1775); Oryzaephilus bicornis (Erichson, 1846); Oryzaephilus sexdentatus (Fabricius, 1792); Silvanus bicornis Erichson, 1846; Tenebrio cursor Fabricius, 1792; Tenebrio surinamensis (Linnaeus, 1758)

= Oryzaephilus surinamensis =

Species of beetle

Oryzaephilus surinamensis, the sawtoothed grain beetle, is a beetle in the superfamily Cucujoidea. It is a common, worldwide pest of grain and grain products as well as chocolate, drugs, and tobacco. The species' binomial name, meaning "rice-lover from Suriname," was coined by Carl Linnaeus, who received specimens of the beetle from Surinam. It is also known as the malt beetle and may be referenced in the poem This Is The House That Jack Built in the line "....the rat that ate the malt that lay in the house that Jack built" the malt referenced may not be actual malted grain but a sawtoothed grain beetle.

== Description and identification ==
O. surinamensis is a slender, dark brown beetle 2.4–3 mm in size, with characteristic "teeth" running down the side of the prothorax. It is nearly identical to Oryzaephilus mercator, or the Merchant Grain Beetle, however, O. surinamensis has smaller eyes and a broader, more triangular head; O. surinamensis unlike O. mercator are unable to fly.

== Distribution ==
O. surinamensis can be found worldwide. The beetle is one of the most commonly encountered stored product pests and is widespread within the food industry and can be found in food manufacturing, storage, and retail facilities, as well as in home pantries. O. surinamensis is less common in colder climates such as Canada and the Northern United States, though is still cold hardy enough to be one of the most common grain feeding insects in Canadian farms.

== Life cycle ==
=== Eggs ===
A female can produce 43-285 eggs in their six to ten month average lifespan which are deposited on a food mass. The ideal temperature range for larvae development within eggs is about 27-29°C (80-85°F), under such conditions they hatch in three to five days.

=== Larvae ===
Larvae are yellow-white with brown heads and grow up to 3mm. They crawl freely around the food mass and feed on broken pieces of grain or grain kernels damaged by other insects, larger larvae may bore into kernels. Larvae account for the majority of damage done to grain. Larvae molt two to four times before pupation.

=== Pupae ===
Larvae pupate by constructing cocoon-like coverings using broken pieces of grain. Emergence as adults occurs after about one week.

=== Adults ===
Adults can live on average six to ten months, though they can live as long as three years. The total life cycle is 27 – 51 days at 85–95 °F (29–35 °C). Adults seek out new sources of food for breeding. In areas which have severe infestations of O. surinamensis adults have been reported to nibble on the skin of people, however, these bites are not harmful.

== Role as a stored product pest ==
O. surinamensis is one of the most commonly encountered insects in grain, pet foods, and seeds. Feeding results in shrinkage of the dry mass of the infested product and in increased water content due to the metabolic activity of the insects which can result in mold growth. In grain, insect damage decreases value and can make it unfit for use; sufficient numbers of insect fragments or live insects can result in rejection by the purchaser.

== Control of infestations ==
In the home, infestations can be avoided by storing dried food products in sealed containers. To control already present infestations, the infested material needs to be identified and disposed of, or frozen- as all life stages of the beetle can be killed by being frozen for six days. In food processing operations and warehouses other means of control may be necessary and fumigation is commonly used, in large-scale grain storage operations a pesticide application may be needed for storage over six months. Fumigation is commonly used to control stored product pests in food and grain, this involves the treatment of product with gasses which are able to diffuse throughout the treated area. The gasses used in fumigation (most often phosphine) are highly toxic to both insects and mammals (including humans) but when applied properly, no fumigant will remain in product after treatment is complete. Because of the high toxicity of fumigants, their use is restricted to qualified applicators and areas which can be tightly sealed.
