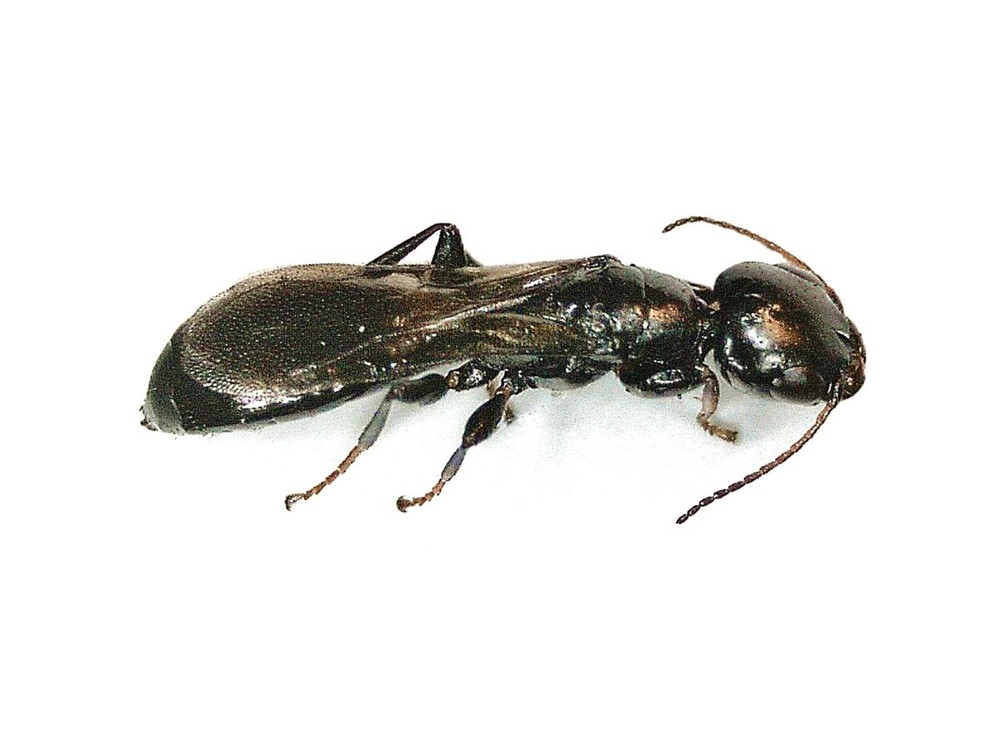

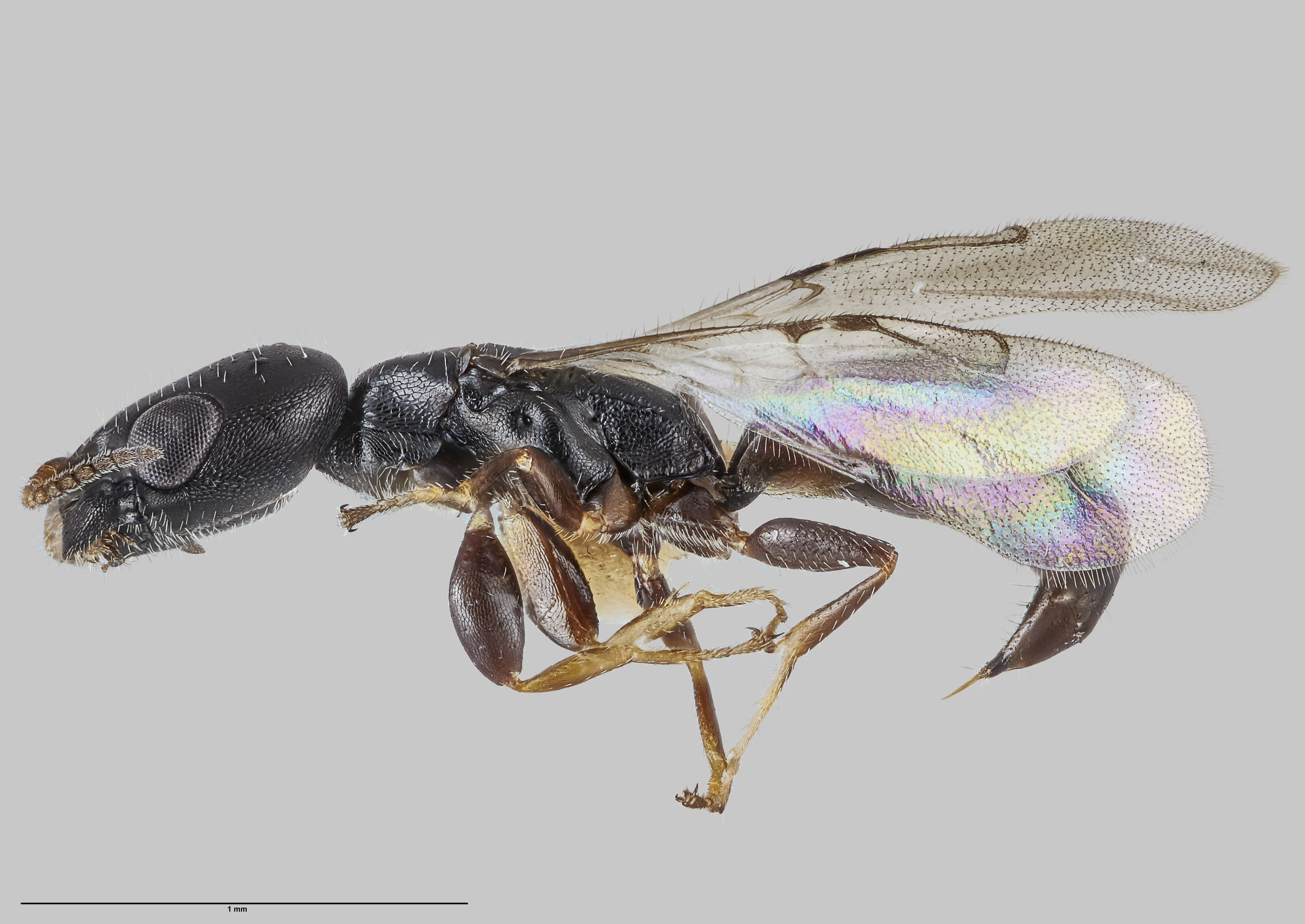
- Sierola gilbertae

Scientific classification
- Kingdom: Animalia
- Phylum: Arthropoda
- Clade: Pancrustacea
- Class: Insecta
- Order: Hymenoptera
- Superfamily: Chrysidoidea
- Family: Bethylidae; Förster, 1856

Subgroups
- See text

= Bethylidae =

Bethylidae Temporal range: Barremian–Recent

Family of wasps

The Bethylidae, also known as flat wasps, are a family of aculeate wasps in the superfamily Chrysidoidea. As a family, their biology ranges between parasitoid wasps and hunting wasps.

== Overview ==
Like most of the Chrysidoidea, the Bethylidae are stinging Hymenoptera, and most are parasitoids. Some of them, however, have developed their parasitoidal biology along predatory lines, and they sting and malaxate their victims into paralysis. Then they hide the prey and lay their eggs on them.

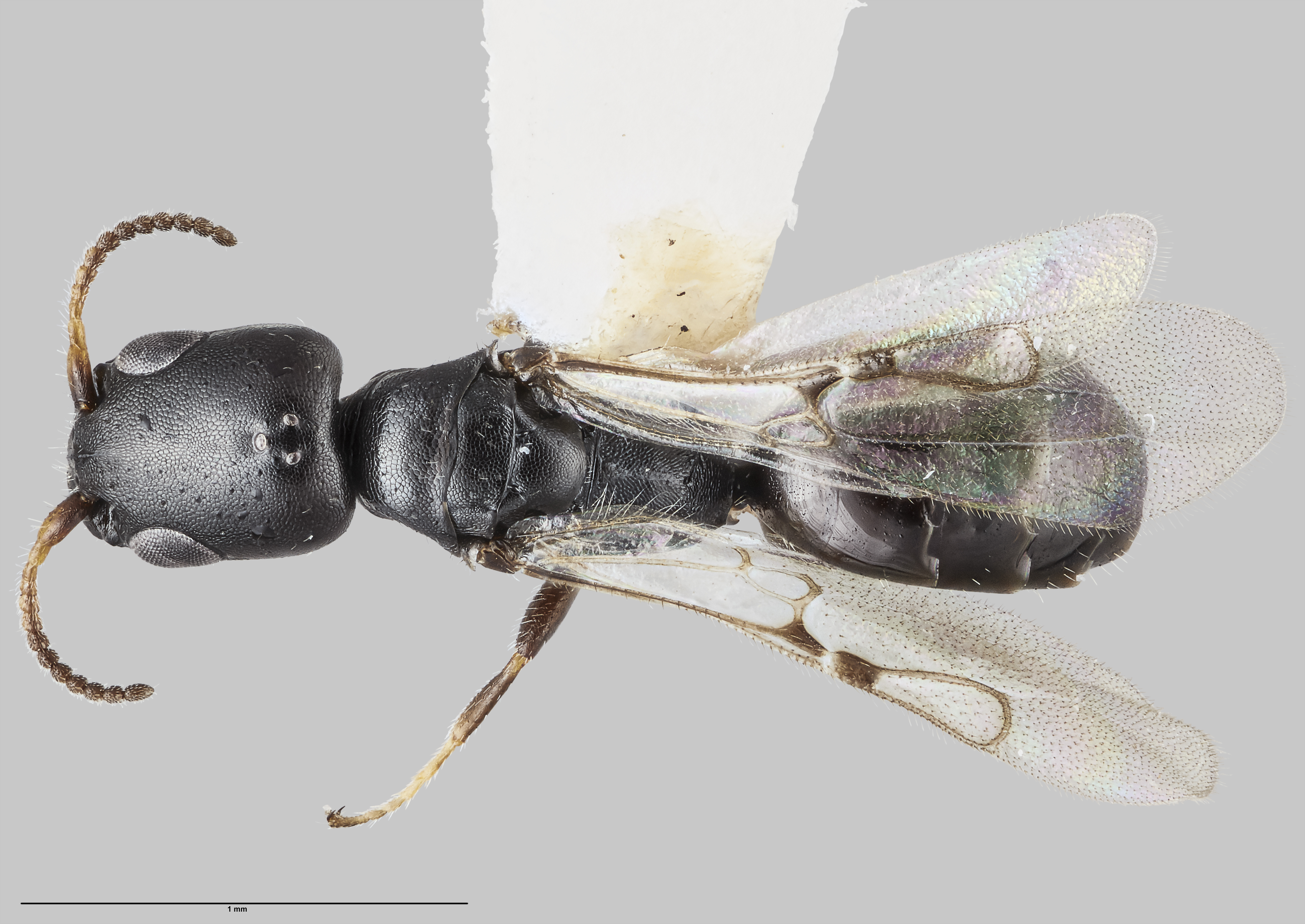
Sierola gilbertae dorsal

According to Brazidec et al. (2024), eight subfamilies of the Bethylidae are recognized:

- Pristocerinae
- Epyrinae
- Mesitiinae
- Bethylinae
- Scleroderminae
- †Elektroepyrinae
- †Lancepyrinae
- †Protopristocerinae

== Biology ==
=== Morphology ===
Bethylids are known as flat wasps for their generally compressed and flattened appearance, a trait which is especially pronounced in females and may aid in nesting. Females of most species share a similar flattened, elongated appearance with a roughly oblong head and forward-set compound eyes. Adult females may be winged or apterous, a trait which can vary between species and even between females within the same species. Males are always winged. Like females, males of all species look similar, but they are less flattened and have smaller heads. Females are larger than males of the same species. Most adult bethylids are two to five millimeters in length, though some species can grow to over 10 millimeters. Because of their small size and similar appearances, identifying bethylids to species is difficult without a microscope and expert knowledge.

=== Feeding and reproduction ===
Bethylid wasps prey on the larvae of beetles and lepidopterans. As basal aculeates, they show feeding habits similar to both parasitoid and hunting wasps. Females crawl onto prey and sting several times to paralyze it, first targeting the nerves controlling the legs and mandibles, and then targeting nerves controlling internal organs, before chewing to further injure the suboesophageal ganglion which controls prey mouth functions. Most species of bethylid then drag their prey to a crevice or hole; some species are known to carry prey on their backs. In most cases, prey is entirely and permanently paralyzed by the attack, but some species only temporarily paralyze their prey.

Most adult female bethylids must feed on their prey to nourish themselves, a process which may take several days, before depositing eggs. In many cases, they attack and feed on more prey than they eventually parasitize. Females may lay several dozen to over 200 eggs on each prey item, but usually not more than 150. Some species practice maternal care, in which adult females guard and clean their young. The time devoted to this care ranges by species from a few days after eggs are laid to the entirety of the larva's development.

=== Defense ===
As aculeate wasps, each adult female bethylid has a stinger used to inject venom. Although predominantly used for attacking prey, they may also sting defensively against threats both their size and substantially larger. Bethylids can have surprisingly painful stings for their small size. Stings typically result in a raised, burning, and/or itchy rash which may persist for several days. No bethylid stings are known to cause medically significant symptoms in healthy adult humans. However, symptoms can be more severe in the case of allergies to compounds in the venom and may require medical attention. Infestations of bethylid wasps may occur in buildings infested by their prey, often moths and beetles which feed on grain or wood. Home bethylid infestations are associated with most reported sting cases as the wasps frequently become trapped against the body inside clothing or on furniture which can result in multiple stings.

Although poorly documented, study has shown that males and females of at least five species in the subfamily Empyrinae produce skatole, a volatile organic compound with a powerful fecal odor. This compound is likely released from glands on the mandibles when the wasp is stressed. The release of skatole and other volatile compounds by bethylids is associated with agonistic behavior, and is more frequently done by losers of fights over resources when attempting to leave the area, suggesting it may act as a defense for retreat after such competitions between bethylids. However, species that release skatole may also use it to deter larger predators.

== Genera ==
According to Azevedo et al. (2018) there are 96 genera belonging to the family Bethylidae. Some are listed here:

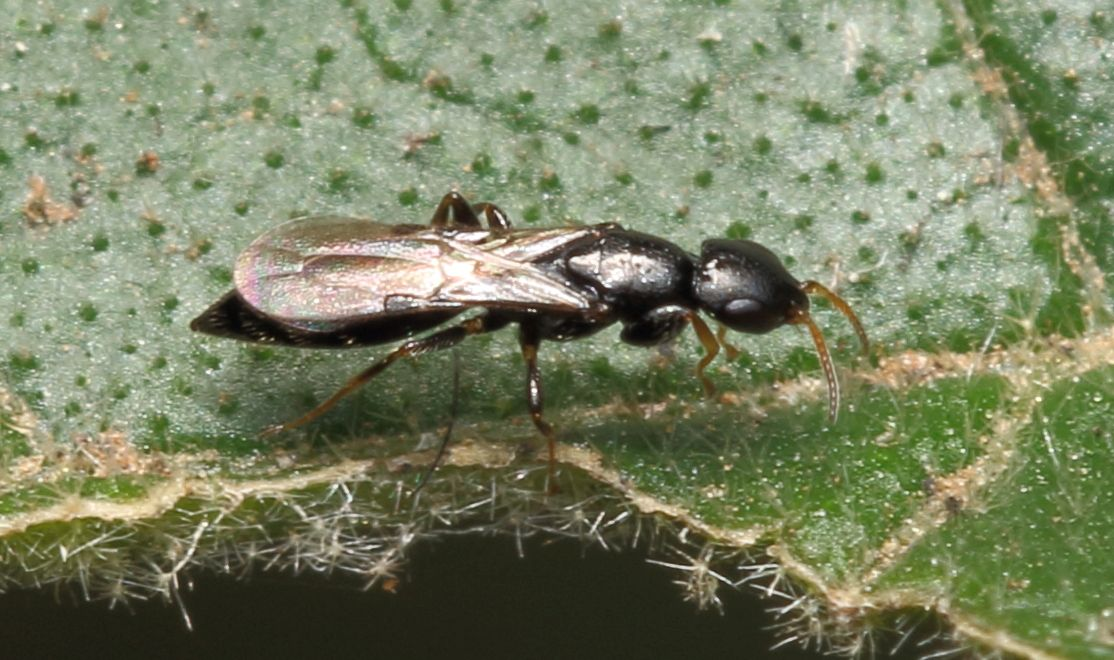

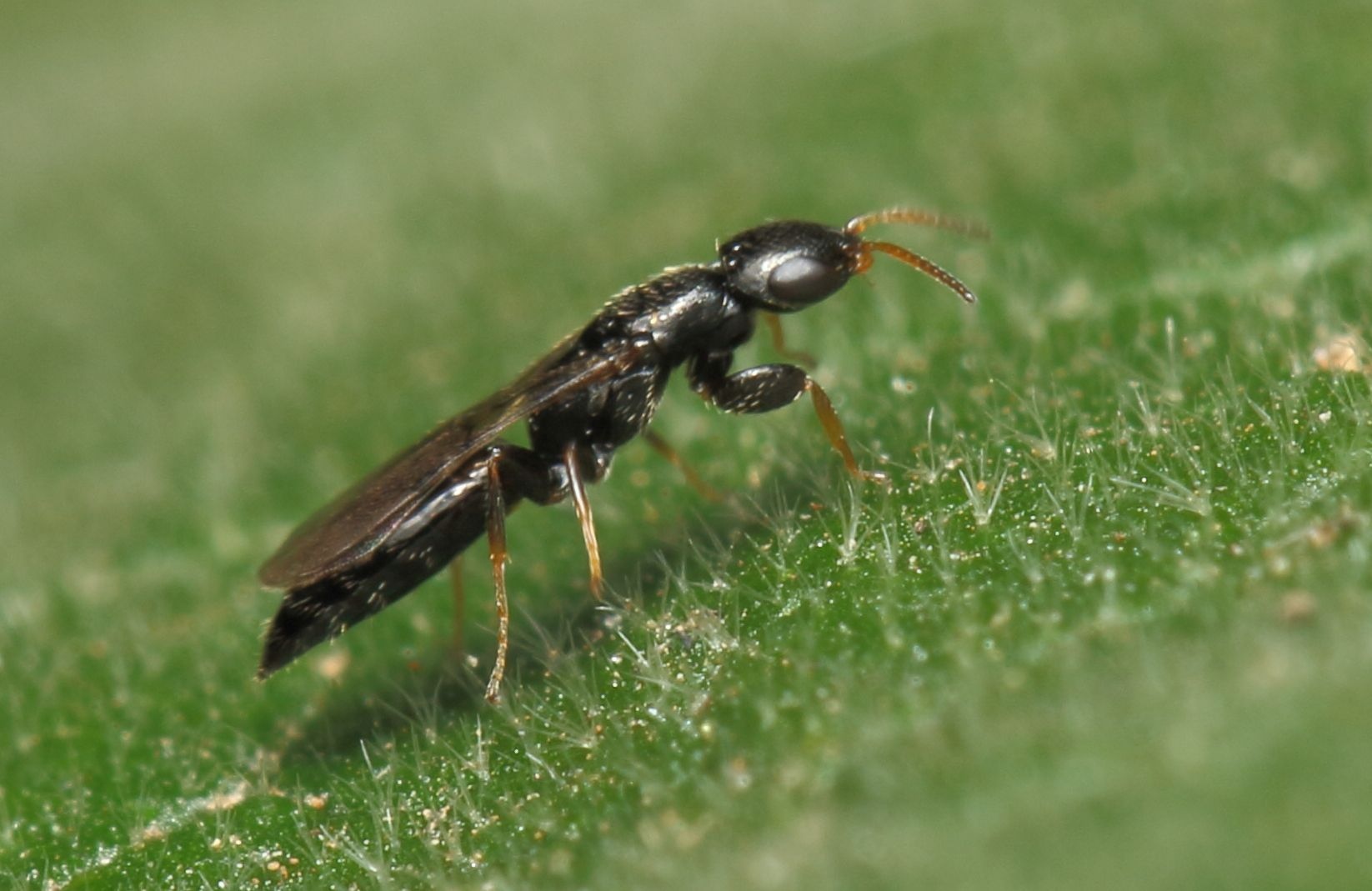

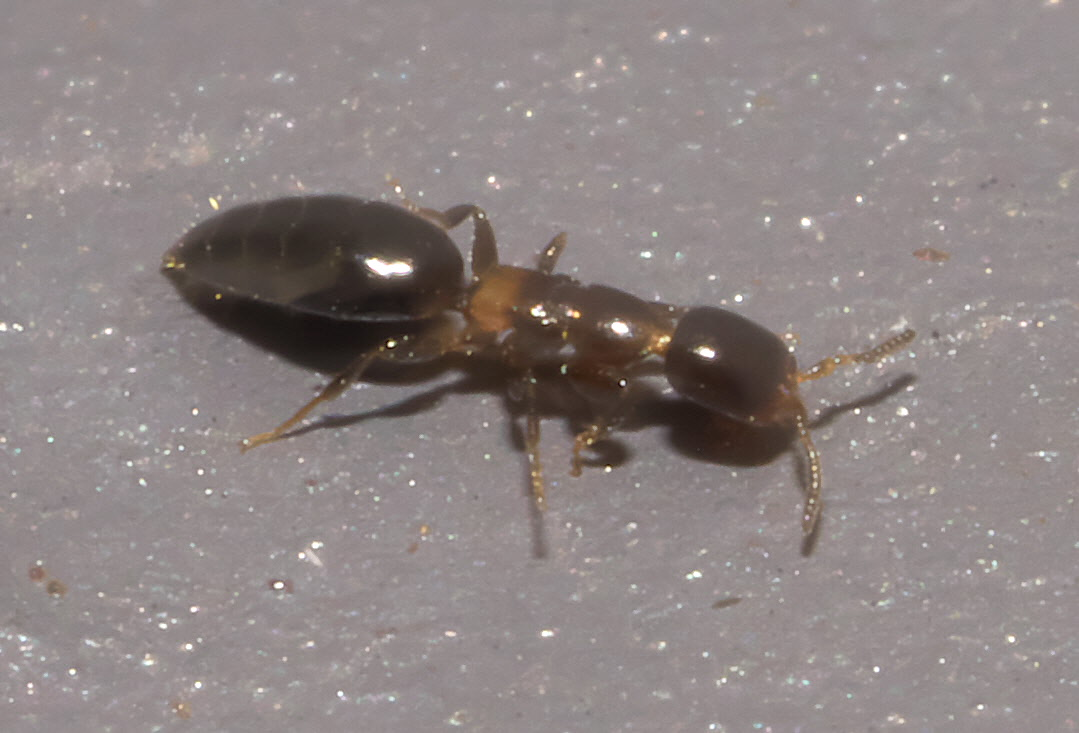
Sclerodermus

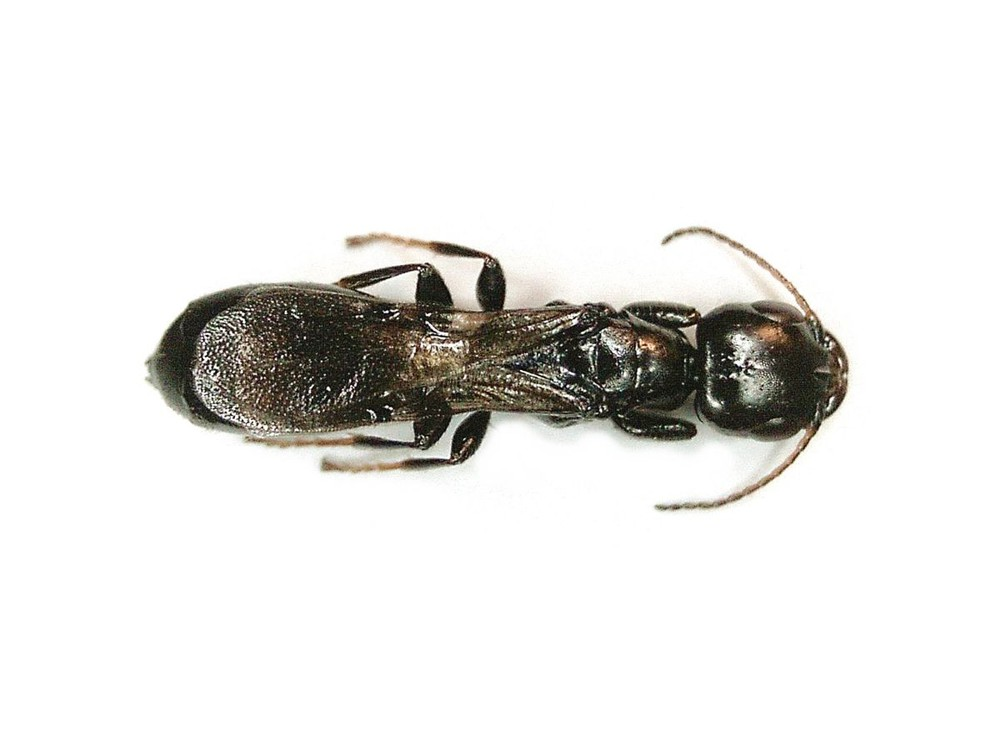

- Afrobethylus Ramos & Azevedo, 2016^{g}
- Afrocera Benoit, 1983^{g}
- Allepyris Kieffer, 1905^{g}
- Allobethylus Kieffer, 1905^{g}
- Anaylax Moczar, 1970^{g}
- Anisepyris Kieffer, 1906^{g b}
- Anisobrachium Kieffer, 1905^{g}
- Apenesia Westwood, 1874^{g b}
- †Archaeopristocera Terayama, 2004^{g}
- †Archaepyris Evans, 1973^{g}
- Aspidepyris Evans, 1964^{g}
- Ateleopterus Förster, 1856^{g}
- Australomesitius Barbosa & Azevedo^{g}
- †Bethylitella Cockerell, 1917^{g}
- Bethylopsis Fouts, 1939^{g}
- †Bethylopteron Brues, 1933^{g}
- Bethylus Latreille, 1802^{g b}
- Caloapenesia Terayama, 1995^{g}
- Calobrachium Gobbi & Azevedo, 2016^{g}
- Calyozina Enderlein, 1912^{g}
- †Celonophamia Evans, 1973^{g}
- Cephalonomia Westwood, 1833^{i c g b}
- Chilepyris Evans, 1964^{c g}
- Clytrovorus Nagy, 1972^{g}
- Codorcas Nagy, 1972^{g}
- †Cretabythus Evans, 1973^{g}
- †Cretepyris Ortega-Blanco & Engel, 2013^{g}
- †Cretobethylellus Rasnitsyn, 1990^{g}
- Dissomphalus Ashmead, 1893^{g b}
- †Elektroepyris Perrichot & Nel, 2008^{g}
- Epyris Westwood, 1832^{g b}
- Eupsenella Westwood, 1874^{g b}
- Foenobethylus Kieffer, 1913^{g}
- Formosiepyris Terayama, 2004^{g}
- Glenosema Kieffer, 1905^{g}
- Goniozus Förster, 1856^{c g b}
- Heterocoelia Dahlbom, 1854^{g}
- Holepyris Kieffer, 1904^{g b}
- Israelius Richards, 1952^{g}
- Itapayos Argaman, 2003^{g}
- Laelius Ashmead, 1893^{g b}
- †Lancepyris Azevedo & Azar, 2012^{g}
- Lithobiocerus Bridwell, 1919^{g}
- †Liztor Ortega-Blanco & Engel, 2013^{g}
- Lytopsenella Kieffer, 1911^{g}
- Megaprosternum Azevedo, 2006^{g}
- Mesitius Spinola, 1851^{g}
- Metrionotus Moczar, 1970^{g}
- Moczariella Barbosa & Azevedo, 2014^{g}
- Odontepyris Kieffer, 1904^{g}
- †Parapristocera Brues, 1933^{g}
- Pararhabdepyris Gorbatovsky, 1995^{g}
- Parascleroderma Kieffer, 1904^{g}
- Pilomesitius Moczar, 1970^{g}
- Plastanoxus Kieffer, 1905^{g}
- Pristocera Klug, 1808^{g b}
- Pristepyris Kieffer, 1905^{g b}
- Prorops Waterston, 1923^{g}
- Prosierola Kieffer, 1905^{g}
- †Protopristocera Brues, 1923^{g}
- Pseudisobrachium Kieffer, 1904^{g b}
- Psilobethylus Kieffer, 1906^{g}
- Pycnomesitius Moczar, 1971^{g}
- Rhabdepyris Kieffer, 1904^{g}
- Sclerodermus Latreille, 1809^{g b}
- Sierola Cameron, 1881^{g}
- Sulcomesitius Moczar, 1970^{g}
- Trichiscus Benoit, 1956^{g}
- Tuberepyris Lanes & Azevedo, 2008^{g}
- Zimankos Argaman, 2003^{g}

Data sources: i = ITIS, c = Catalogue of Life, g = GBIF, b = Bugguide.net

== Evolution ==
The oldest known records of the group are from the Barremian aged Lebanese amber.
