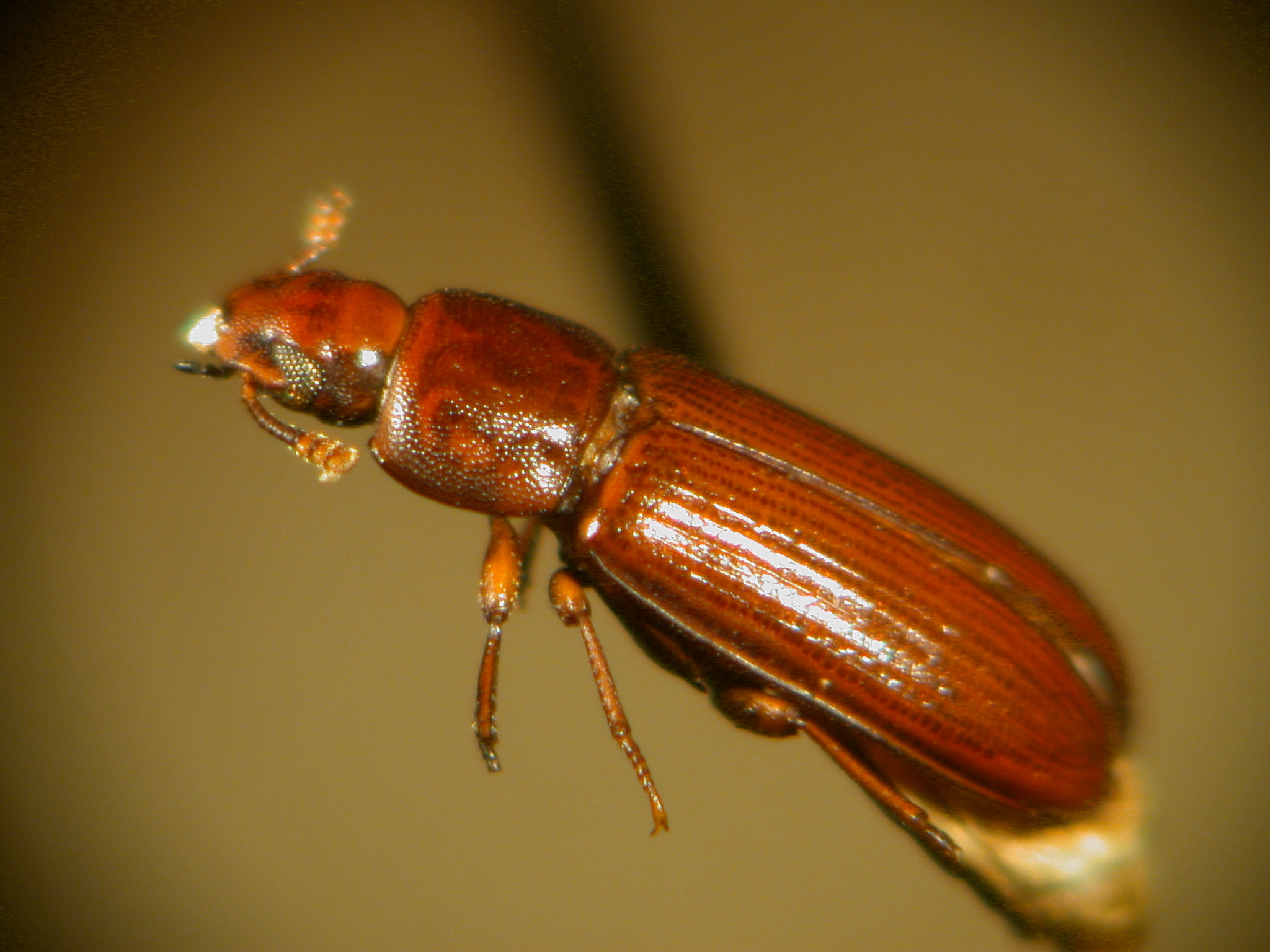
- Tribolium castaneum

Scientific classification
- Kingdom: Animalia
- Phylum: Arthropoda
- Clade: Pancrustacea
- Class: Insecta
- Order: Coleoptera
- Suborder: Polyphaga
- Infraorder: Cucujiformia
- Superfamily: Tenebrionoidea
- Family: Tenebrionidae

Genera
- Aphanotus; Gnatocerus; Latheticus; Palorus; Tenebrio; Tribolium

= Flour beetle =

Flour beetles

Common name for beetles that eat flour

Flour beetles are members of several darkling beetle genera including Tribolium and Tenebrio. They are pests of cereal silos and are widely used as laboratory animals, as they are easy to keep. The flour beetles consume wheat and other grains, are adapted to survive in very dry environments, and can withstand even higher amounts of radiation than cockroaches.

Red flour beetles infest multiple different types of products such as grains, cereals, spices, seeds, and even cake mixes. They are also quite resistant to insecticides, which makes their damage very impactful on the economy of milling industries.

The larvae of T. molitor, when full-grown, are known as mealworms; small specimens and the larvae of the other species are called mini mealworms.

Female reproduction is distributed over their adult life-span which lasts about a year. Flour beetles also display pre-mating discrimination among potential mates. Female flour beetles, specifically of T. castaneum, can mate with different males and may choose more attractive males over the course of their adult life-span.

== Description ==
Flour beetles are a reddish-brown, oval-shaped insect. They have clubbed antennae on their head. They range from around 1/8 to 3/16 inch. Tribolium castaneum, more commonly known as red flour beetles, are known to fly. Other species of flour beetles crawl.

== Selected species ==
- Aphanotus brevicornis – North American flour beetle
- Tribolium castaneum – red flour beetle
- Tribolium confusum – confused flour beetle
- Tribolium destructor – destructive flour beetle
- Tenebrio molitor – yellow mealworm beetle
- Tenebrio obscurus – dark mealworm beetle
- Gnatocerus cornutus - broad horned flour beetle

== Diet ==
Flour beetles consume a number of foods to survive. Flour beetles feed on many grain products, cereal, chocolate, and a number of powdered foods; including flour, spices, powdered milk, pancake mix and cake mix.

Flour beetles participate in cannibalism. However, it is not a biological characteristic. It is suggested that they partake in cannibalism considering it raises the fitness of flour beetles that are in a habitat of weak sustainability. Additionally, it is a form of parental care. Some species produce trophic eggs for their children to eat. Those that engage in cannibalism are normally adults or larvae that consume pupae or eggs. Eggs and pupae fall prey to the older flour beetles because they do not have defense mechanisms being so young. Furthermore, the eggs and pupae are easily digestible, making them susceptible to becoming prey.

== Distribution and habitat ==
In current day, Tribolium are more commonly found in stored food products. However, originally Tribolium lived under the bark of trees or in rotting wood. It is unknown of the exact time that flour beetles made the switch from bark to food products, but for as long as humans created grain piles, flour beetles have been using them as habitats. Tribolium confusum stem from Africa or Ethiopia. Tribolium castaneum originate in India. In present day, flour beetles are dispersed worldwide and do not reside in any specific country.

== Sexual selection and reproduction ==
Tribolium use chemical signals, more specifically a pheromone, 4,8-dimethyldecanal (DMD), to attract mates. DMD attracts both females and males. DMD is isolated from Tribolium castaneum, Tribolium confusum, Tribolium freemani, and Tribolium madens. Tribolium participate in polyandry and continually lay eggs. Female Tribolium employ cryptic choice and accept or reject male spermatophores. Females also adjust the amount of spermatophores they accept based on male phenotypes. More specifically, Tribolium casataneum females are more inclined to accept more spermatophores from male mates if they are reoccurring mates.

== Competition ==
An experiment done by Zane Holditch and Aaron D. Smith found that while there is competition among Tribolium species, the success of a species may depend on the timing of arrival and resources available. Results demonstrate that when species are simultaneously put together, Tribolium castaneum were competitively dominant. Tribolium castaneum grew larger populations than its competitors that were added later. Moreover, Tribolium castaneum thrived competitively from having early arrival in comparison to Tribolium confusum.

== Research ==
In 2008, the Tribolium castaneum genome was sequenced by the Tribolium Genome Sequencing Consortium. Triboilum are easy to use for research because they have a high growth rate and they thrive very well in a simple flour culture.

=== Evolutionary and ecological research ===
Tribolium beetles have contributed to research for a long period of time. Tribolium experiments demonstrate that a multitude of factors determine success in colonization for any population. Experiments show that frequency and size, genetic and demographic processes, and individuals' relative fitness play a role in the success of colonizing populations. Tribolium have also allowed researchers to gain a better understanding on the dynamics of population size.

=== Radiation Tolerance ===
A study by Tuncbilek et al found that Red Flour Beetles (Tribolium castaneum) had radiation tolerances as tabulated below, finding that 100 Gy was the effective radiation dose for both larval and adult stages of the insect.

Radiation tolerances (all values in units of Greys)
Stage	LD50	LD99
Larval Stage	19.75	42.97
Adult Stage	33.21	64.50
Human	5.	8.

In their 2008 season, the science entertainment TV program MythBusters found that Flour Beetles were able to withstand more radiation than German cockroaches and fruit flies. All three species were irradiated with a Cobalt-60 source with doses of one thousand, ten thousand, and a hundred thousand rad each, and the flour beetles were the only species with any living specimens left 30 days after exposure to 100,000 rad.

== See also ==
- Grain beetle (disambiguation)
