= Aphanotus brevicornis =

Scientific classification
- Domain: Eukaryota
- Kingdom: Animalia
- Phylum: Arthropoda
- Class: Insecta
- Order: Coleoptera
- Suborder: Polyphaga
- Infraorder: Cucujiformia
- Family: Tenebrionidae
- Genus: Aphanotus
- Species: A. brevicornis

Binomial name
- Aphanotus brevicornis (LeConte, 1859)

Synonyms
- Eulabis brevicornis; Tribolium brevicornis; Tribolium brevicorne

Species of beetle

Aphanotus brevicornis, the North American flour beetle, is a species of flour beetle in the family Tenebrionidae. It is a pest of stored foodstuff, particularly processed grains.

This species was originally described as Eulabis brevicornis by LeConte, later placed in the genus Aphanotus by Casey, and further moved to Tribolium by Hinton. However, phylogenetic studies have shown that A. brevicornis is more closely related to Latheticus oryzae and Gnatocerus cornutus than to other Tribolium species, therefore warranting replacement of this species in its previous, otherwise defunct, genus Aphanotus .
