= Storage pest =

A storage pest is an insect or other animal that damages or destroys stored food or other valuable organic matter. Insects make up a large proportion of storage pests, with each type of crop having specific insects that gravitate towards them. For example, insects of the genus Tribolium, such as Tribolium castaneum (red flour beetle) or Tribolium confusum (confused flour beetle), primarily damage flour crops.

== Insects ==
Insects can partially damage or even completely destroy crops. By decreasing the protein content and removing the seeds from the grains, insects can affect the quality of the crop and its ability to germinate new ones.

=== Types of insect pests ===
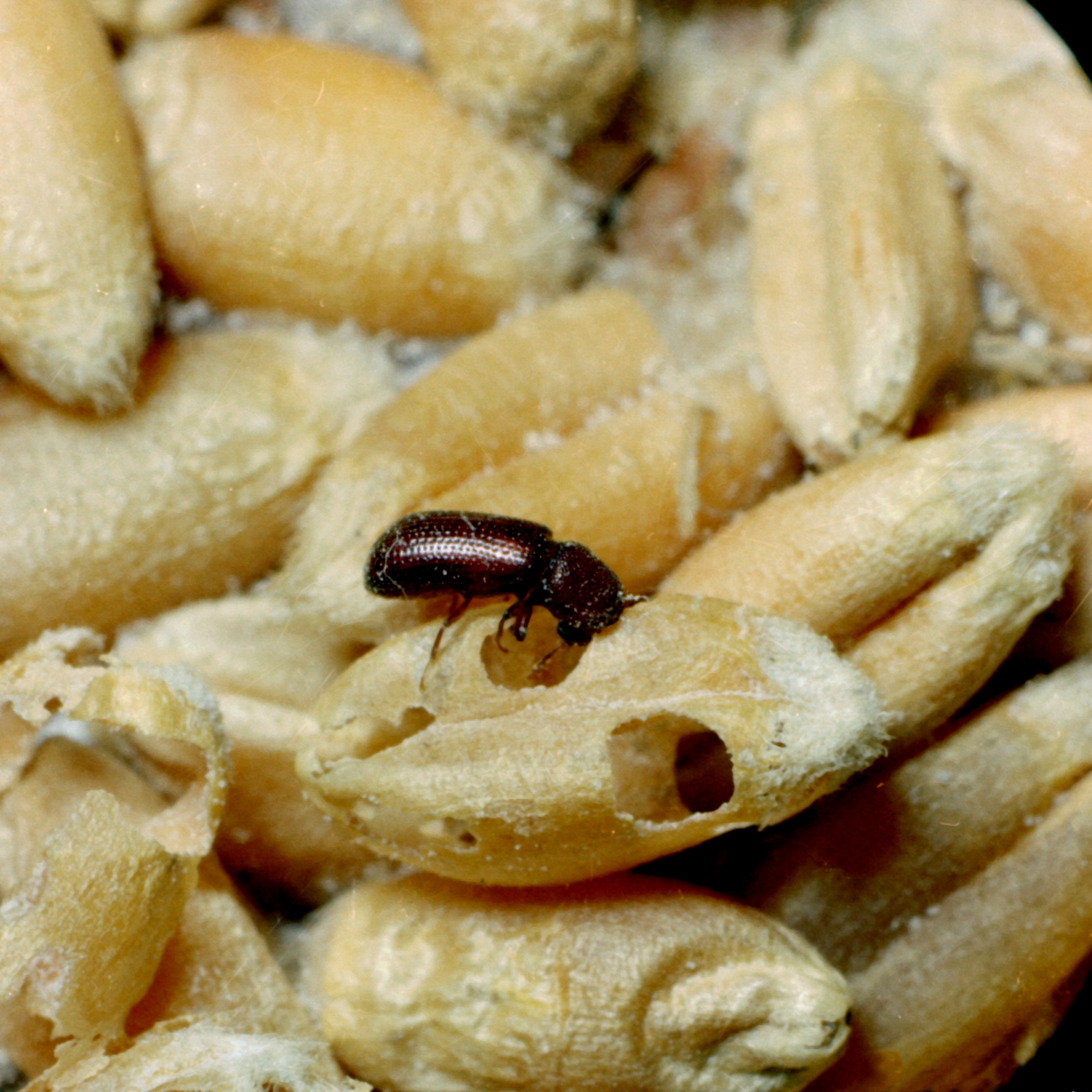
Lesser grain borer

There are two types of grain insect pests, primary and secondary pests.

==== Primary pests ====
Primary grain pests attack the whole grain. The eggs are laid inside the grain, before the larvae mature inside the grain and then chew their way out. Some of these pests include the Lesser grain borer, Granary weevil (Sitophilus granarius, the Wheat weevil) and Rice weevil (Sitophilus oryzae).

===== Lesser grain borer (Rhyzopertha dominica) =====
The lesser grain borer has a dark coloured cylindrical structure with the head concealed. When lesser grain borer eggs are laid, they are laid outside the grain, however they mature inside the shell of the seed which can take up to 6 weeks if the temperature is cooler, with the adult borers not living for longer than two months. This species is known to damage stored wheat, maize/corn and other cereal crops with the seeds becoming hollowed out husks. Products with small infestations should be discarded however the grains can be treated with smaller amounts of spray. However, large infestations require more control, including complete fumigation.

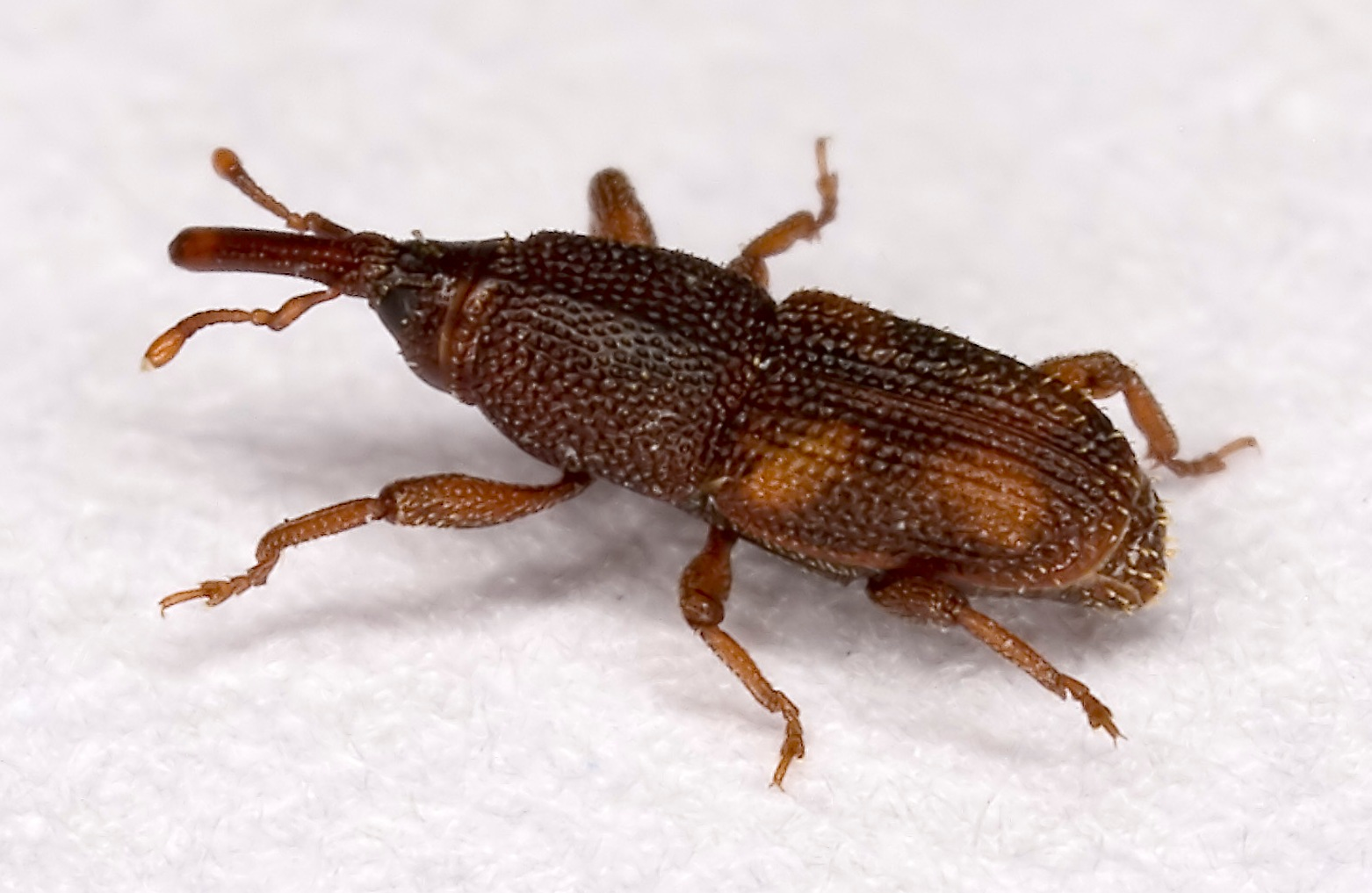
Rice weevil (Sitophilus oryzae).

===== Rice weevil (Sitophilus oryzae) =====
The adult rice weevil has an orange-black exoskeleton and lays up to 450 eggs in pores of the damaged grains with each hatched egg further damaging the grain from the inside. Similarly to the lesser grain borer, maturation also happens inside the grain with the matured adult rice weevil eating through the husk of the grain to get out. The life cycle is similar to that of the lesser grain borer in summer months (approximately one month) and adult weevils live up to 8 months after the experience their life cycle.

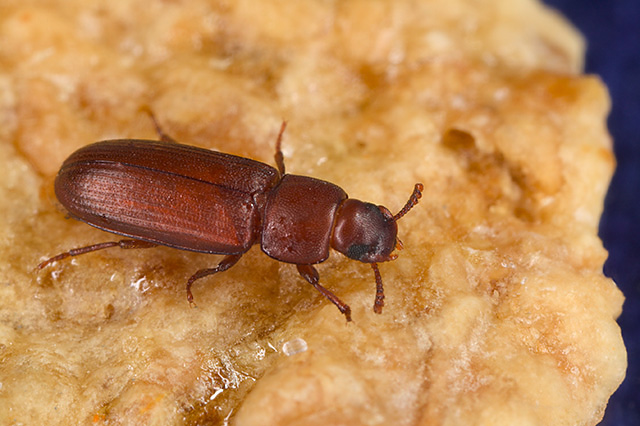
Rust-red flour beetle (Tribolium castaneum).

==== Secondary pests ====
Secondary grain insects feed on broken grain and any powder products left as a result of the broken grain. These pests include the genus Tribolium, beetle species and moth species.

===== Rust-red flour beetle (Tribolium castaneum) =====
The Red flour beetle or Rust-red flour beetle is a red-brown beetle with an exoskeleton that darkens in colour as the beetle increases in age, with the maximum adult age being a year. Unlike primary pests, Rust-red flour beetles can produce up to 1000 eggs and lay them inside the damaged grain with parts of the larvae able to use the damaged grains and cereal as their food source.

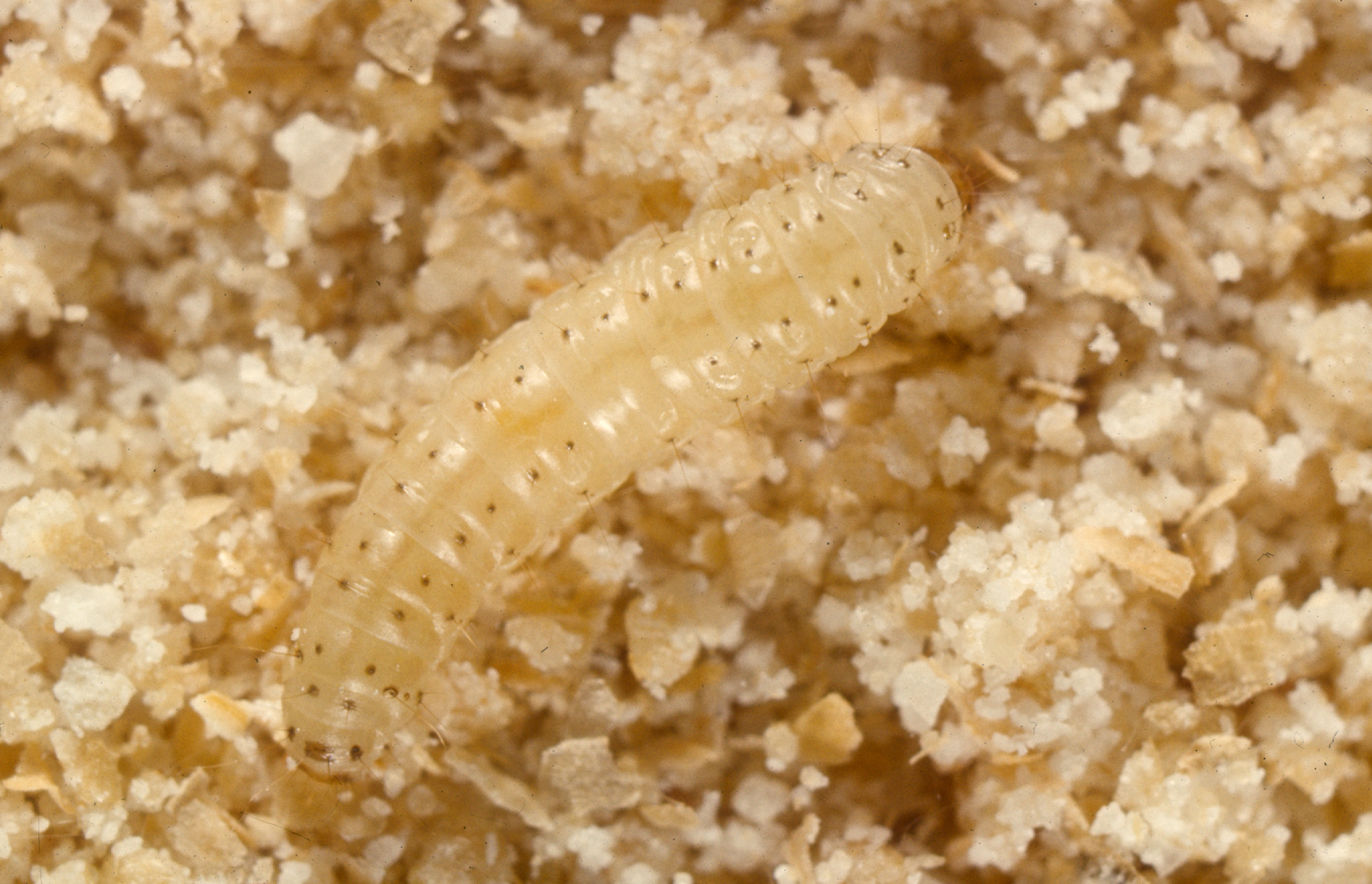
Warehouse moth (Ephestia elutella).

===== Warehouse moth (Ephestia elutella) =====
The Warehouse moth is a grey moth that remains on the surface of the grain with the female moth laying up to 200 eggs, however their life span is only 2 weeks long with a 4 week life cycle. Similarly to other secondary pests, the Warehouse moth eggs use the surface of the grain, although when the larvae hatch they leave a stream of silk that encapsulates the surface of the grain which can then be used as a cocoon for mature larvae.
