= M. americanum =

M. americanum may refer to:

- Malacosoma americanum, the eastern tent caterpillar, a moth species that forms communal nests in the branches of trees
- Mammut americanum, the American mastodon, an extinct North American mammal species that lived from about 3.7 million years ago until about 10,000 years BC
- Megatherium americanum, an extinct ground sloth species endemic to South America that lived from the Pliocene through Pleistocene
- Mezium americanum, the American spider beetle, a scavenger insect species found in various locations around the world
