= Home-stored product entomology =

Study of insects that infest food products

Home-stored product entomology is the study of insects that infest foodstuffs stored in the home. It deals with the prevention, detection and eradication of pests.

This field is related to forensic entomology, as consumers who find contaminated products may choose to take legal action against the producers. Suitably qualified entomologists are likely to be able to determine the identity of contaminant species, even when no insects are found and the only evidence of infestation is the resulting damage. They should also be able to determine whether the foodstuff was contaminated before or after purchase, to determine whether the producer (rather than the consumer) is at fault.

== Major stored product pests ==
=== Flour beetles (Tribolium castaneum and Tribolium confusum) ===
Red flour beetle

Two different types of beetles are classified as flour beetles: the red flour beetle and the confused flour beetle, which have similar physical characteristics. They are flat and oval in shape and usually range around 1/8 inch (3.2 mm) long. Their exoskeletons are reddish brown with a shiny and smooth texture. In both species, the eggs are white or colorless. They are very small in size and have a sticky outer covering that causes certain food particles to stick to them. The larvae have six legs, with two pointy projections toward the caudal end. Finally, the pupal stage (a cocoon-like form) is usually a white or brownish color. The beetle life cycle lasts about three years or more, with the larval stage ranging anywhere from 20 to over 100 days, and the pupal stage around eight days. Beetles usually breed in damaged grain, grain dust, high-moisture wheat kernels, and flour. The female flour beetle can lay between 300 and 400 eggs during her lifetime [a period of 5 to 8 months]. The flour beetles mainly infest grains, including, but not limited to: cereal, corn-meal, oats, rice, flour, and crackers. This type of beetle is the most abundant insect pest in flour mills across the United States. Their small size allows them to maneuver through cracks and crevices and get into the home and other areas. Once they are present in areas with potential food sources, they can infest material such as flour, resulting in a sharp odor or moldy flavor. The red flour beetle can fly short distances and the confused flour beetle is unable to fly. While the confused flour beetle is more commonly found in the northern United States, the red flour beetles are more predominant in the southern United States in areas with warmer climates.

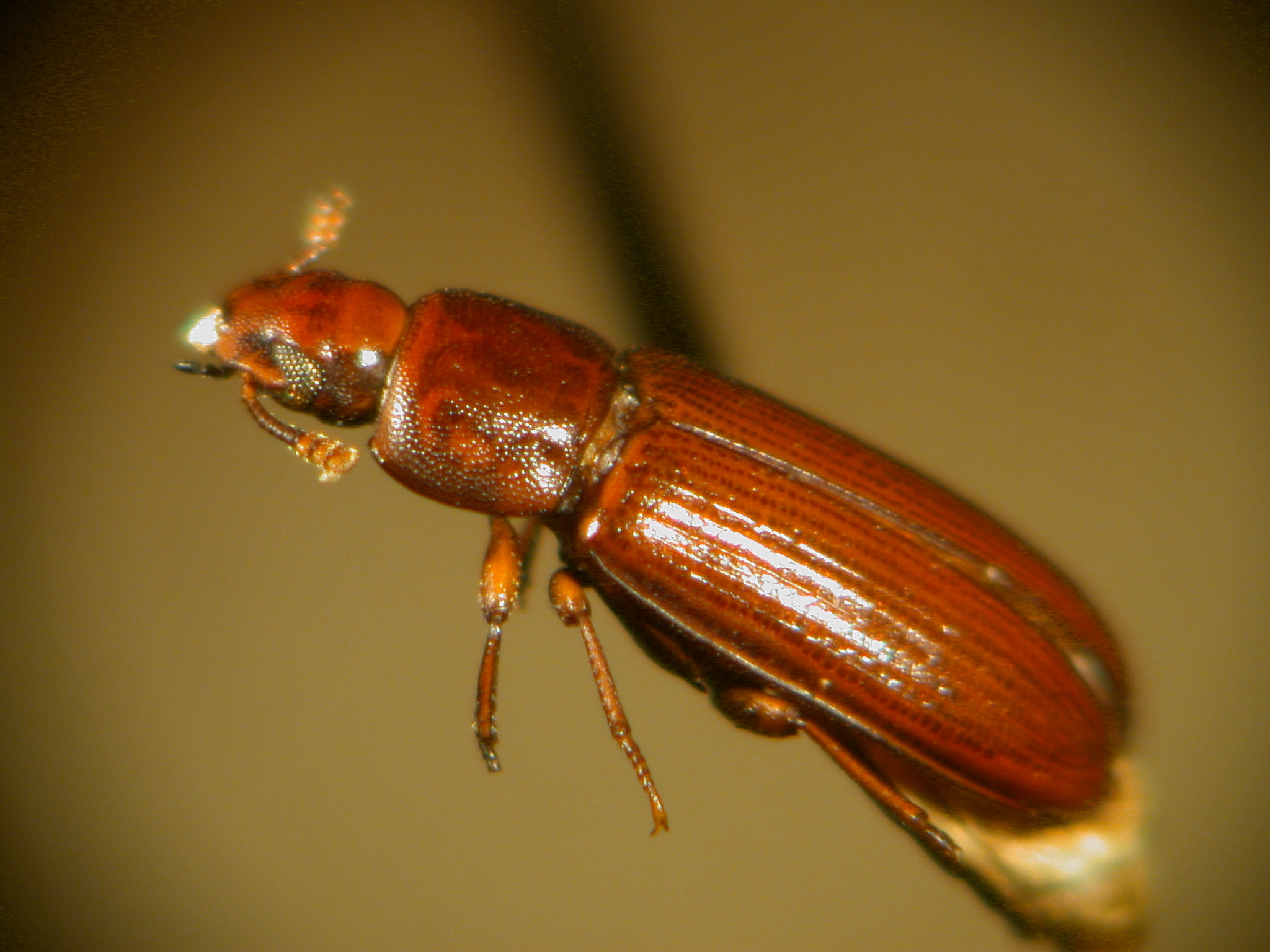
Tribolium castaneum

The red flour beetle and the confused flour beetle are commonly used as model organisms, to study genetics and ecology. The genome of the red flour beetle has been sequenced.

=== Drugstore beetle (Stegobium paniceum) ===
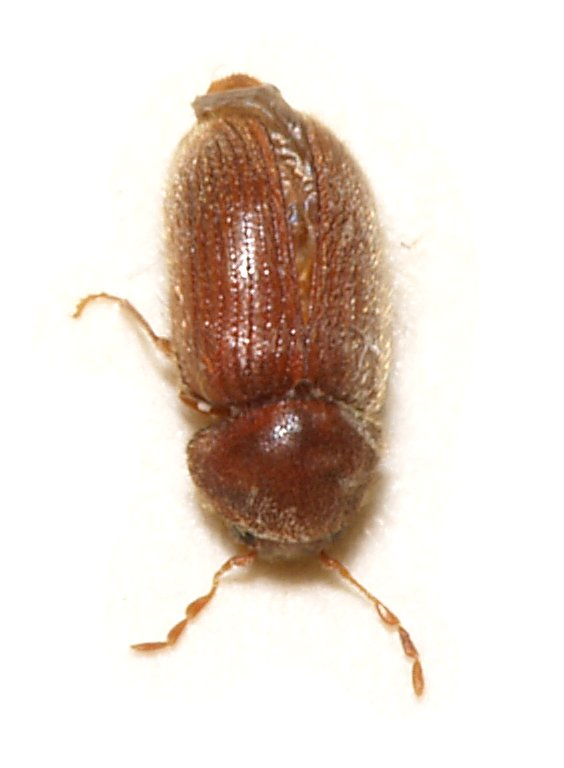
Drugstore beetle

This beetle is related to the commonly known cigarette beetle. Adult drugstore beetles are cylindrical with lengths ranging from 2.25 to 3.5 millimetres (11/128 to 9/64 in). They are a reddish-brown color and have elytra, sclerotized (hardened) wings that fold back over the abdomen and hinge upwards, allowing the hind wings to come out to fly. Females are capable of laying up to 75 eggs during a 13- to 65-day period. After the eggs are laid, they hatch into a larval period that can range anywhere from four to 20 weeks. After the larval period, drugstore beetle larvae move out of the substrate to build a cocoon and pupate. The pupation period takes a total of 12–18 days. The entire life cycle of the drugstore beetle lasts approximately two months but can be as long as seven months. These stored product pests will infest almost anything readily available. Food products prone to infestation include flour, dry mixes, breads, cookies, and other spices. Nonfood materials include wool, hair, leather, and museum specimens. This specific type of beetle has symbiotic yeasts that produce B vitamins, which allow the beetle to survive even when consuming foods of low nutritional value. They are found in areas that have a warmer climate, yet are less plentiful in the tropics than the cigarette beetle.

=== Sawtoothed grain beetle (Oryzaephilus surinamensis) ===
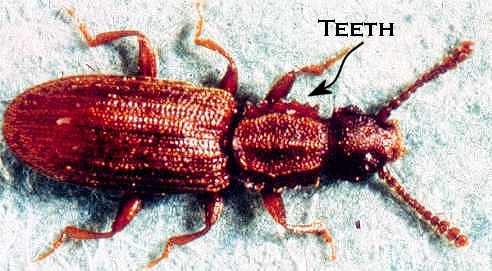
Sawtoothed grain beetle

The sawtoothed grain beetle is closely related to the merchant grain beetle, and is commonly found in kitchen cabinets feeding on items such as cereal, breakfast foods, dried fruits, macaroni, crackers, etc. They are the most common grain and stored product pest in the United States. They are very active and tend to crawl rapidly while searching for food. They are small insects, reaching a length of about 1/8 of an inch. Their name originates from their distinguishable, sawtooth-like projections found on each side of the thorax. The body of the beetle is flat and slender in shape, and brown in color. The size and shape of the mandibles allow the beetles to easily break through well-sealed packaged foods. An adult female can lay between 45 and 250 eggs that usually hatch within three to 17 days. The larvae have a caterpillar-like appearance, with a yellowish coloration to the body and a brown head. The larval period can last as long as 10 weeks but can be as short as two weeks. Following the larval instars is the pupal period, which can last one to three weeks. The pupal stage is characterized by the unique process by which these beetles stick together pieces of food material to form protective coverings around their bodies. A fully mature adult beetle, under optimal conditions, can live a maximum of four years, a long lifespan for an arthropod.

=== Indianmeal moth (Plodia interpunctella) ===
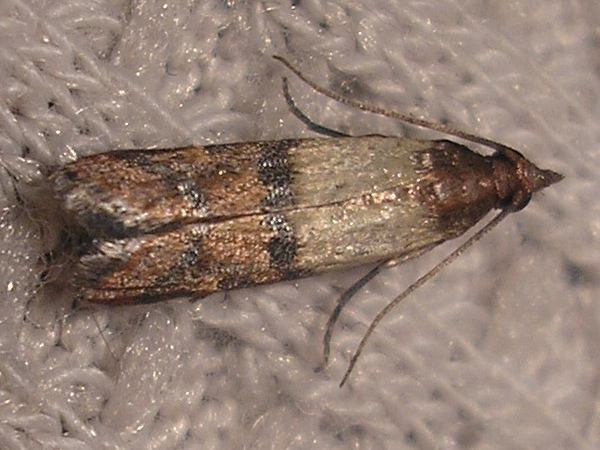
Indianmeal moth

Indianmeal moths can infest a variety of foods found in the home. Coarsely ground grains, cereals, dried fruits, and herbs are common items the moths have been known to infest. They have also been found in animal feeds, such as dry dog food, fish food, and even bird seed. Adult moths are small; generally, their length averages about 3/8 inch, with a 5/8-inch wing span. As adults, the moths are easily identified by an overall grayish, dirty complexion. However, the wing tips have a bronze color that helps differentiate this particular moth from other household moths. The adults have a distinct forewing pattern, as well, which consists of a light-colored base with about two-thirds of the distal area a red to copper color. The larval stage, or caterpillar, is characterized by a pinkish or yellowish-green body color with a dark brown head. The larval stage of the moth's life cycle is centered on food sources; during the last instar, these larvae are characterized by a movement towards a protected area to pupate. These caterpillars can chew through plastic packaging and will often produce silk that loosely binds to food fragments. The pupal stage is generally observed as tiny cocoons that hang from the ceiling; these cocoons can also be found on walls, as well as near the food source. A female can lay over 200 eggs and will usually die after this process because adult Indianmeal moths do not eat.

=== Fruit flies (Drosophila melanogaster) ===
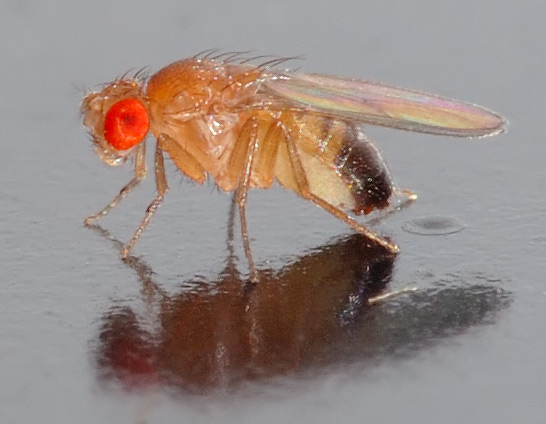
Fruit fly

Fruit flies are found near ripened or fermenting fruit. Tomatoes, melons, squash, grapes and other perishable items brought in from the garden are a common cause of an indoor infestation. Fruit flies can also be attracted to rotting bananas, potatoes, onions and other unrefrigerated produce purchased at the grocery store and taken home. The body of the fruit fly is tan towards the front part of the body and black towards the rear. They usually have red eyes and are about 1/8 inch long. Females have the ability to lay over 500 eggs, usually in fermenting fruit as a food source. The only environment necessary for successful reproduction is a moist film and fermenting material. Generally, fruit flies are a problem during late summer and fall due to their attraction to ripening and fermenting fruits and vegetables. The entire life cycle can be completed in about two weeks. Rarely, because of their ability to fly in and out of the home through windows and screens, they have the capability of contaminating food with bacteria and disease-producing organisms.

=== Other stored product pests ===
- Flour mite Acarus siro
- House cricket Acheta domesticus
- Common furniture beetle Anobium punctatum
- Varied carpet beetle Anthrenus verbasci
- Fur beetle or carpet beetle Attagenus pellio
- Black carpet beetle Attagenus unicolor
- Black larder beetle Dermestes ater
- Larder beetle Dermestes lardarius
- Hide beetle Dermestes maculatus
- Cacao moth Ephestia elutella
- Mediterranean flour moth Ephestia kuehniella
- Cigarette beetle Lasioderma serricorne
- Silverfish Lepisma saccharina
- Spider beetle Mezium americanum
- Red-legged ham beetle Necrobia rufipes
- Golden spider beetle Niptus hololeucus
- Yellow V moth Oinophila v-flavum
- Merchant grain beetle Oryzaephilus mercator
- Australian spider beetle Ptinus tectus
- Meal moth Pyralis farinalis
- Lesser grain borer Rhyzopertha dominica
- Rice weevil Sitophilus oryzae
- Maize weevil Sitophilus zeamais
- Angoumois grain moth Sitotroga cerealella
- Yellow mealworm Tenebrio molitor
- Cadelle beetle Tenebroides mauritanicus
- Destructive flour beetle Tribolium destructor
- Carpet moth or tapestry moth Trichophaga tapetzella
- Khapra beetle Trogoderma granarium
- Clothes moths – several species

== Detection of an infestation ==
Insects can be identified by examining the type of food and the character of the damage done in the absence of the insect itself, which helps determine what type of control is needed. Having an insect specimen and accurately identifying it can lead to eradication, and ultimately, prevention.

Foods commonly infested include:

- Whole or cracked grains (rice)
- Flour, meal, or similar ground grain products
- Spices
- Cereals
- Pasta
- Candy
- Powdered milk
- Nuts (whole or pieces)

Other items include, but are not limited to: Rodent baits (that contain grain as a feeding attractant), dry pet food, bird seed, grass seed, some powdered soap detergents, dried flowers, potpourri, items stuffed with dried beans or other plant material, and tobacco products.

To identify an insect, and consequently make a decision about the type of control to be implemented, the type of food must first be noted, especially in the absence of a specimen. Although identifying the food is a general start to begin to identify the insect, it must be remembered that it is not always the most accurate method, but is mostly used as a guideline, as some insects are more likely than others to be found in certain types of grain, flour, etc. The type of food is not always conclusive to the type of insect found in it, as insects are not extremely picky, and many families and species are found on a wide range of different foodstuffs. Using the infested item as a guideline, noting the type of damage done to the product is the next step. Some insects, like the drugstore beetle, leave telltale tiny holes in the damaged product, while Indianmeal moths are notorious for the spider web-like threads left behind in the food they infest. These observations can generally lead to a mostly accurate conclusion about the type of insects causing the damage, but obviously the most accurate conclusion relies on any specimen found either directly in the stored product or in the vicinity. The larvae, pupae, and adults can be found directly in the product while usually only the pupae and adults are found in the vicinity of the product. It is not practical to assume any person has knowledge of general entomology, so the following analysis focuses on the five major pests that most commonly infest stored products, beginning with the type of foods infested, signs indicative of a particular insect infestation, and a description of the larvae, pupae, and adults, including behavior, as well as appearance.

=== Red flour beetle detection ===
Damage caused by red flour beetles

This beetle is similar to the saw-toothed grain beetles in both habits and types of products infested. It is a serious pest in flour mills and wherever cereal products and other dried products are stored and/or processed. Generally, the beetle is attracted to grain with a high moisture content, and usually causes the grain to acquire a grayish tint. The beetle may also impart a bad odor, which then affects the taste of the infested products, as well as encouraging the growth of mold in the grain. This foul odor and taste in the various food products are caused by pheromones and toxic quinone compounds.

=== Sawtoothed grain beetle detection ===
The sawtoothed grain beetle feeds on a plethora of feeds, but is not capable of attacking whole or undamaged grains; therefore, the larvae are commonly found in processed grains (flour and meal), dry dog food, dried fruits, candy bars, tobacco, drugs, dried meats, and a variety of other stored food products.

=== Drugstore beetle detection ===
These beetles will infest almost anything—they are found most often, however, in flour, bread, spices, breakfast foods, and meal. In the case of an infestation, contaminated products have telltale tunnels which have the appearance of tiny holes. These beetles do not sting, bite, or harm pets or damage a house, yet have the potential, in large infestations, to become a nuisance by flying on doors and windows in heavy populations.

=== Indianmeal moth detection ===
Indianmeal moths infest both cereal and stored grain products, packaged goods, and surface layers of shelled corn. The most telltale sign of the Indianmeal moth is the silk webbing the larvae (caterpillars) produce when feeding on the surfaces of foods. This silk webbing may appear to be or resemble cobwebs inside the products' containers. Often, a few larvae may be found in the packaging of the product, along with the 'cobwebs', cast skins and frass.

Larvae are white worms with black heads, which, when ready to pupate, crawl up the walls of the home in most cases, and are suspended from the ceiling attached by a single silken thread. Most complaints about these moths come during the warmer parts of the year- usually July through August- but the moths can appear during any month. As with all insects important to stored product entomology, it cannot be automatically assumed that products were previously infested, yet, it is more common for these moths to contaminate products before purchase than for the moth to fly into a home through open windows or doors. An important aspect of the Indianmeal moth is that the larva is the only stage of the insect's life cycle to feed on stored products, the adults do not.

=== Fruit fly detection ===
A fruit fly larva feeding on a cherry

Fruit flies are attracted to ripened fruits and vegetables, usually in the kitchen area, but will breed in garbage disposals, empty bottles and cans, wet or damp mops or cleaning rags, and trash containers. The only requirement for these flies to breed is a moist film of fermenting material. Infestations can originate from over-ripened fruits or vegetables that were previously infested, and then brought into the home, or from fruit over-ripening in the home. Since adults can also fly from the outside through screened doors or windows, it can not always be assumed that the product in question was infested before it was brought into the home. The larvae are found on the inside layer of the fruit, directly beneath the skin. If the outer layer of the fruit is removed, the rest of the fruit can be salvaged. Fruit flies are primarily a nuisance pest.

== FDA regulations ==
Defect action levels have been a part of the food industry for nearly a century. The first established defect action level was created in 1911 for mold in tomato pulp. However, limits for insect fragments and larvae were not added until the 1920s on various fruits and vegetables. In 1938, the Federal Food, Drug and Cosmetic Act was established in the United States to provide a more defined reference based on strict limitations and methods.

Major companies spend a large amount of money every year to aid in the prevention of food contamination. Most of these dollars are well spent and do, in fact, prevent food from becoming contaminated on a large scale; however, many "defects" are found in consumers' meals on a daily basis. The Food and Drug Administration states, "it is economically impractical to grow, harvest, or process raw products that are totally free of nonhazardous, naturally occurring, unavoidable defects".

The general public proposes that companies should use more chemicals or pesticides to control this "problem", though the amount of pesticide and chemicals necessary to eradicate all insects from foodstuff would pose a threat to any human's health, much more harmful than a controlled quantity of insect and rodent fragments. The food defect action levels, as proposed by the FDA, is a list of ordinances and guidelines by which manufacturers and industrial food agencies must abide to ensure the safe service of foodstuff. However, these detection levels are labeled with maximum limitations only. Due to the impossibility of preventing all unavoidable defects in foods, the FDA attempts to prevent these health hazards from reaching a harmful level. Therefore, it is understood and regarded that all manufactures are allowed to have low numbers of insect and rodent hairs present in food, as long as the product is still considered "safe" for human consumption.

== Prevention and eradication ==
=== Prevention ===
To prevent the infestation of foodstuffs by pests of stored products, or "pantry pests", a thorough inspection must be conducted of the food item intended for purchase at the supermarket or the place of purchase. The expiration date of grains and flour must also be noted, as products that sit undisturbed on the shelf for an extended period of time are more likely to become infested. This does not, however, exclude even the freshest of products from being contaminated. Packaging should be inspected for tiny holes that indicate there might be an infestation. If there is evidence of an insect infestation, the product should not be purchased. The store should be notified immediately, as further infestation must be prevented. Most stores have a plan of action for insect infestations. Bringing an infested product into a pantry or a home leads to a greater degree of infestation. In the home, putting cereal or grain-type items in protective containers will also help to prevent an infestation or the spread of insects from one product to another. Insects can chew through thin plastic, foil, cardboard and other packaging used for product for resale; transferring purchased products into heavy glass containers that can be tightly sealed or heavy plastic containers can improve sanitation and prevent infestation. Using the oldest products first and buying grains and cereals in smaller quantities which can be used quickly, depending on the size or intake of the family, decreases the chances of infestation. Fruit flies, however, present an entirely different approach to prevention. The primary method to controlling and eliminating fruit flies is to eradicate sources of attraction. Ripened produce should be either eaten, discarded, or refrigerated. Any damaged or cracked fruit or vegetable needs to be trimmed, and the damaged piece discarded in case larvae or eggs are present in the area in question. Careful attention must be paid to potential breeding sites that, when forgotten, could cause a massive infestation—all recycling and compost bins must be cleaned, and areas must be checked for forgotten, rotting fruit. Because of their small size, fruit flies are capable of breeding on the inside of the lid of a container. Therefore, when personally canning fruits or vegetables, beer, cider, or wine, the container must be well-sealed. Adults moths can lay eggs under the lid of a jar, allowing the larvae to crawl into the food source when hatched. Homeowners should also outfit their doors and windows with tight mesh screens to prevent the adult fruit flies from flying in from outdoors. Preventive methods and sanitation are the keys to avoiding an infestation or contamination of foodstuffs.

=== Eradication ===
Although not seen when groceries are purchased, some products have the possibility of being infested prior to being placed in the pantry. A periodic check of susceptible foodstuffs is necessary, especially in summer months when most insects are more active. In the event an infestation is discovered, steps must be taken to eradicate the insects. Controlling an infestation is a lengthy process and insects may still be seen, albeit in dwindling numbers, for several weeks. All infested items, as well as uninfested items, must be removed from shelves, thoroughly cleaned and vacuumed. After vacuuming, the waste containing the infested material must be removed and discarded. Items should be checked for beetles, larvae, and pupae; all food items must be inspected, as well, and special attention must be paid to items rarely used. The infested items may either be discarded, heated, or frozen to kill the insects. If the food is chosen to be discarded, the item must be completely removed from surrounding premises to prevent re-infestation. Freezing products for three to four days or heating them to about 130–140 °F (54–60 °C) for 30 to 40 minutes will rid the product of the pests. Decorative ornaments and objects made with plant material and seed in the vicinity of stored products will increase the risk of re-infestation; insects can feed on those items until they locate stored products. These items should also be thrown out or disinfected by freezing or heating. Cleaning the area where the infested products were found is advisable, as well. Cleaning with bleach or ammonia, however, will not help with the eradication of the pests. Using a vacuum cleaner to clean the area thoroughly, especially in cracks and corners where insects may hide, will decrease the chances of re-infestation. Because food will be stored in that area again, pesticides are not a good method of eradication. Pesticides can leave a residue that can contaminate food products stored near it. Also, once a pest is inside the container, the pesticides have no effect. If the infestation is so severe that pesticides are the only way to contain the problem, a professional should be contacted immediately. Do not try to apply pesticides to any area where food is stored for human or animal consumption. Contamination can occur and cause illness or more severe conditions. Proper storage and cleanliness are the only ways to prevent an infestation from occurring. Sanitation is the key to prevention and eradication of any pests.

== See also ==
- List of common household pests
- The Food Defect Action Levels
