= Grain beetle =

Grain beetle may refer to:

- Flat grain beetle
- Foreign grain beetle
- Merchant grain beetle
- Saw-toothed grain beetle

== See also ==
- Flour beetle
- Storage pest
