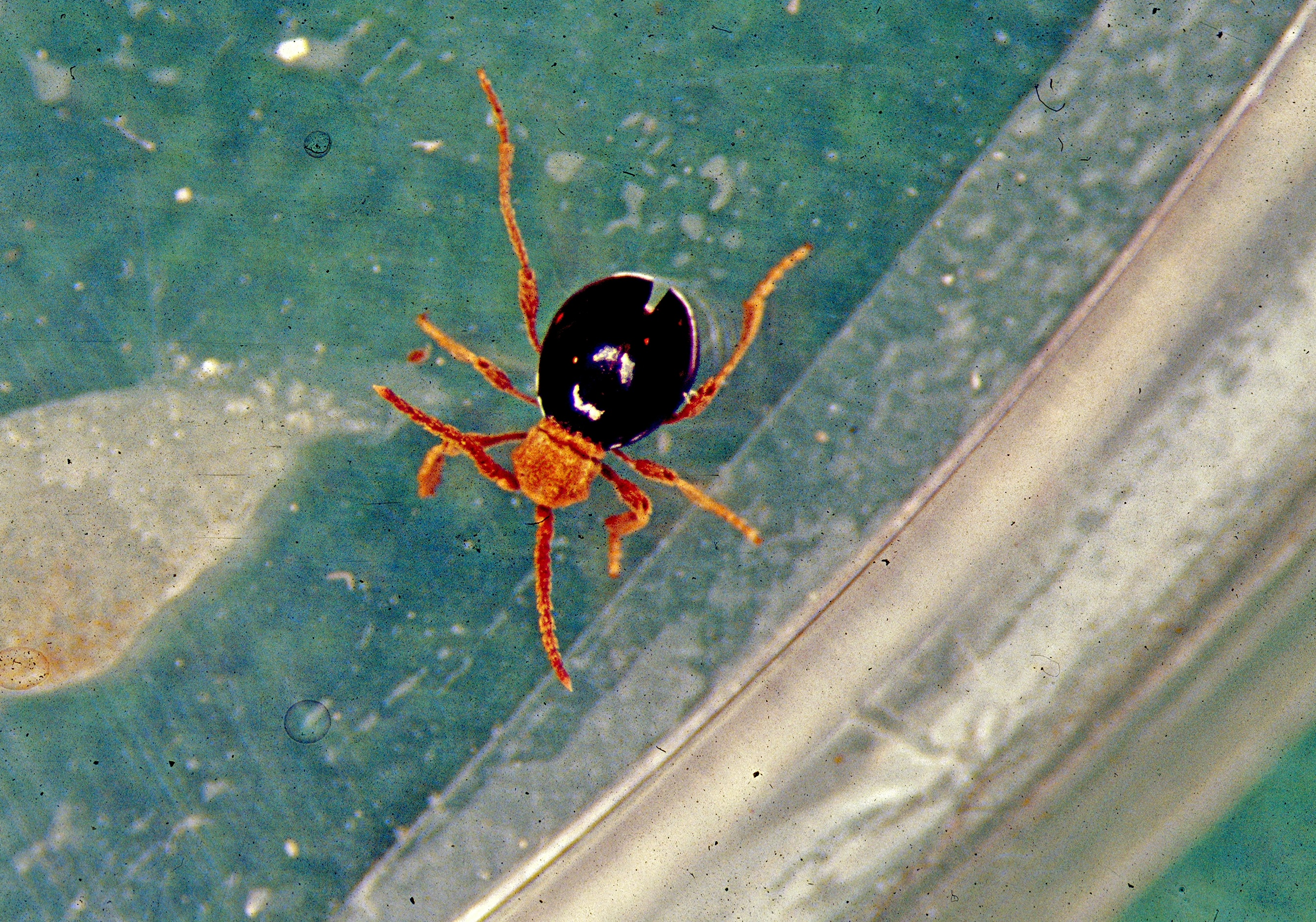
- Mezium americanum

Scientific classification
- Kingdom: Animalia
- Phylum: Arthropoda
- Class: Insecta
- Order: Coleoptera
- Suborder: Polyphaga
- Family: Ptinidae
- Subfamily: Ptininae
- Tribe: Meziini
- Genus: Mezium; Curtis, 1828

Species
- See text

= Mezium =

Genus of beetles

Mezium is a genus of beetles in the subfamily Ptininae, the spider beetles. It is distributed throughout most of the world. There are two centers of distribution: an area extending from the Iberian Peninsula to Morocco, including the Canary Islands; and an area extending through central and southern Africa. Several species are recently described African endemics. They are most common in coastal areas, and in regions with a Mediterranean climate.

Their most common natural habitat type is caves, where they feed on animal feces, especially bat guano. They are adaptable to human-made structures such as barns and chicken coops.

Species include:

- Mezium affine – shiny spider beetle
- Mezium africanum
- Mezium americanum – American spider beetle, black spider beetle
- Mezium andreaei
- Mezium giganteum
- Mezium glabrum
- Mezium gracilicorne
- Mezium horridum
- Mezium namibiensis
- Mezium pseudafricanum
- Mezium pseudamericanum
- Mezium setosum
- Mezium sulcatum
