= Aphanotus =

Scientific classification
- Kingdom: Animalia
- Phylum: Arthropoda
- Class: Insecta
- Order: Coleoptera
- Suborder: Polyphaga
- Infraorder: Cucujiformia
- Family: Tenebrionidae
- Tribe: Triboliini
- Genus: Aphanotus; Leconte, 1962

Genus of beetles

Aphanotus is a genus of darkling beetles in the family Tenebrionidae. Species in this genus were previously within Tribolium but placed in the genus Aphanotus following phylogenetic evidence.

== Species ==
- Aphanotus brevicornis (Leconte, 1859)
- Aphanotus carinatum (Hinton, 1948)
- Aphanotus gebieni (Uyttenboogaart, 1934)
- Aphanotus parallelus (Casey, 1890)
- Aphanotus linsleyi (Hinton, 1948)
- Aphanotus setosum (Triplehorn, 1978)
- Aphanotus uezumii (Nakane, 1963)
