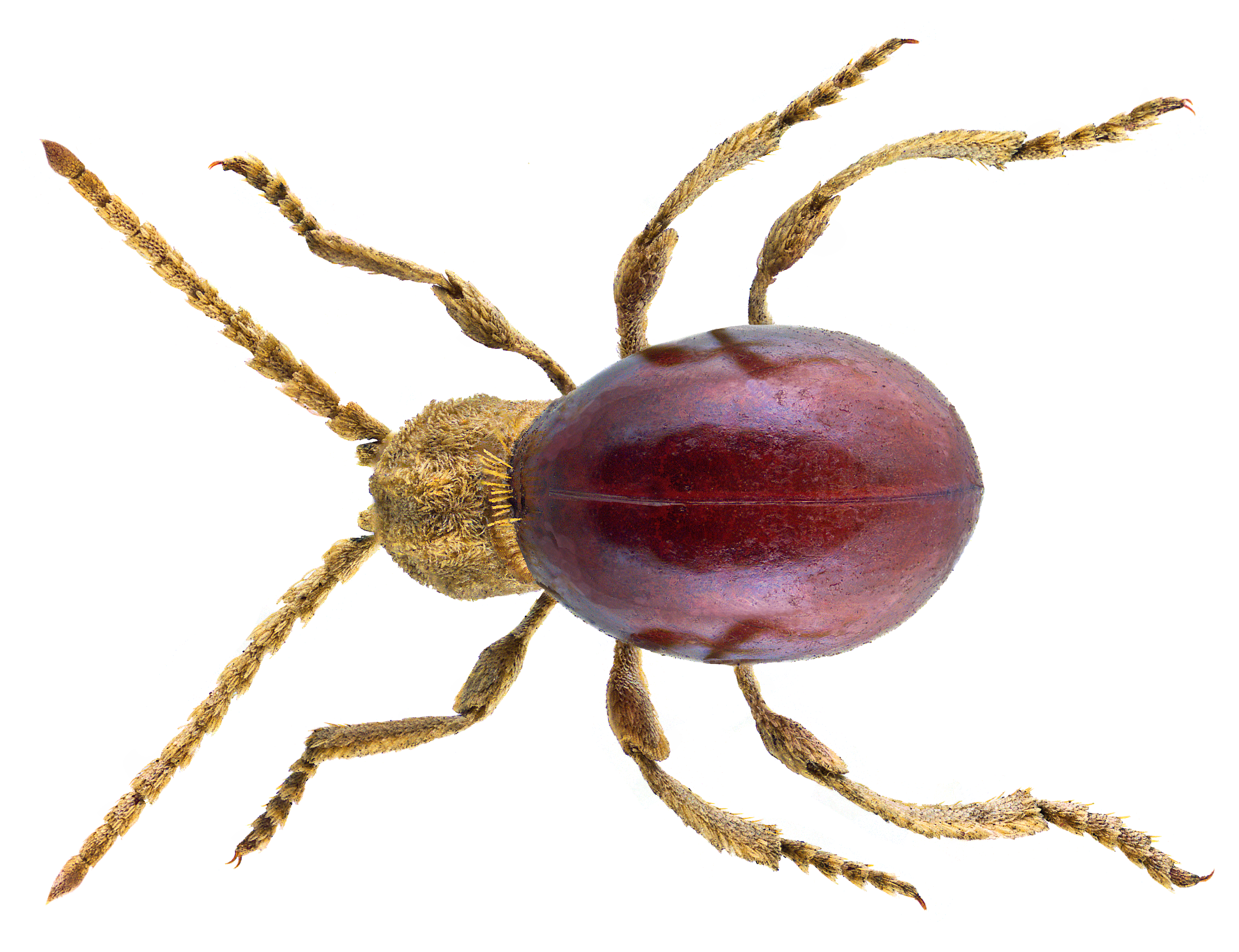

Scientific classification
- Kingdom: Animalia
- Phylum: Arthropoda
- Class: Insecta
- Order: Coleoptera
- Suborder: Polyphaga
- Family: Ptinidae
- Genus: Mezium
- Species: M. affine

Binomial name
- Mezium affine Boieldieu, 1856

Synonyms
- Mezium hirtipenne

= Mezium affine =

Species of beetle

Mezium affine is a species of beetle in the family Ptinidae. Its common names include shiny spider beetle, northern spider beetle, and hood spider beetle. It occurs throughout the Northern Hemisphere, and it is an introduced species in Australia.

This beetle is 1.5 to 3.5 millimetres (0.059 to 0.138 in) long with a very convex oval body. The abdomen is reddish brown to black, and the legs, antennae, and other parts are cream-colored. The head, thorax, and legs have a coating of scaly yellowish or gray hairs. The rounded body shape earned it the common name spider beetle. The larva is up to 4.5 millimetres (0.18 in) long and yellowish white in color with a brownish head. It is coated in yellowish hairs.

The larvae infest stored food and other products. They are known to live on grain, spices, fish meal, dog biscuits, dried fruit, dried meat, dried mushrooms, seeds, wool, hair, feathers, skins, book bindings, dead insects, feces, and sugar. It can be found in libraries and museums, where it may damage specimens and collections.
