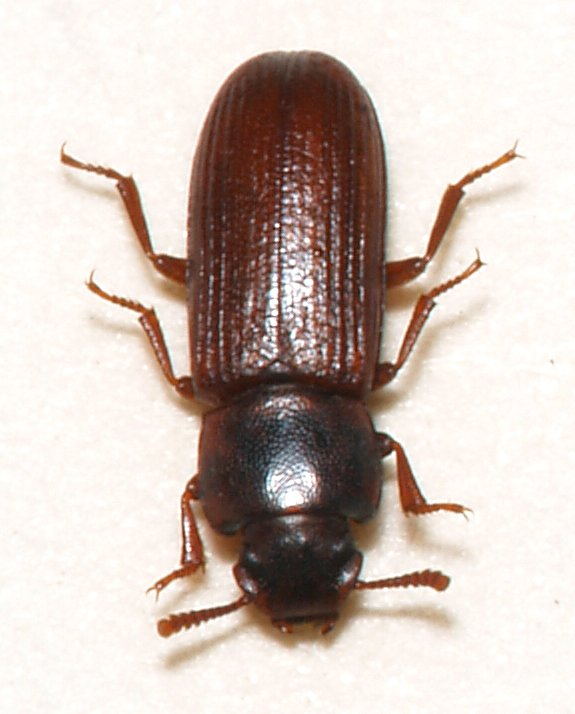

Scientific classification
- Kingdom: Animalia
- Phylum: Arthropoda
- Clade: Pancrustacea
- Class: Insecta
- Order: Coleoptera
- Suborder: Polyphaga
- Infraorder: Cucujiformia
- Family: Tenebrionidae
- Genus: Tribolium
- Species: T. confusum

Binomial name
- Tribolium confusum Jacquelin du Val, 1863

= Confused flour beetle =

Tribolium confusum

Species of beetle

The confused flour beetle (Tribolium confusum), a type of darkling beetle known as a flour beetle, is a globally found, common pest insect known for attacking and infesting stored flour and grain. They are one of the most common and most destructive insect pests for grain and other food products stored in silos, warehouses, grocery stores, and homes. Multiple chemicals have been used to manage their infestation, including pyrethrin and fungal insecticides.

The "confused" in the beetle's name is due to it being confused with the red flour beetle, not because of its walking pattern. They engage in cannibalistic behaviors for population control and as a food source. Like many insects, Tribolium confusum also evolved altruistic social behaviors via kin selection to improve their inclusive fitness.

== Description ==
The confused flour beetle is very similar in appearance and habit to the red flour beetle, Tribolium castaneum and the destructive flour beetle, Tribolium destructor. Both the confused flour beetle and red flour beetle are small, about 3–6 mm (1/8–1/4 in) in length, and reddish-brown in color. The primary distinguishing physical difference is the shape of their antennae: the confused flour beetle's antennae increase gradually in size and have four clubs, while the red flour beetle's antennae have only three. Additionally, red flour beetles have been known to fly short distances, while confused flour beetles do not. Tribolium destructor is much darker than either and less common.

== Geographic range ==
The red flour beetle originates from the Indo-Australian region and thrives in temperate regions but can also endure winter in sheltered environments, particularly with central heating. In the United States, its presence is mainly seen throughout the southern states. Conversely, the confused flour beetle, initially from Africa, exhibits a broader global distribution and favors cooler climates which makes it more prevalent in the northern states.

== Food resources ==
While confused (and red) flour beetles cannot feed on whole, undamaged grain, they are often found in large numbers in infested grains, feeding on broken grain, grain dust, and other household food items such as flour, rice, dried fruit, nuts, and beans. Both types of beetles are often found not only in infested grains, but in crevices in pantries and cabinets, as well. Damage to food caused by the beetles' feeding is made obvious by their dead bodies, fecal pellets, and foul-smelling secretions. Their presence also encourages the growth of mold.

The confused flour beetle is typically found in mills, bakeries, and warehouses, feeding on cereal grains. While it is found in various types of grain storages, it has been observed to feed on cracked barley, while being unable to feed and develop from cracked white rice sources. The beetle has developed genetic variability due to differential use of insecticides and different environments, making it difficult to kill. These findings are important because the feeding behavior has high economic costs, and the beetle produces secretions that can cause skin irritation and respiratory disorders.

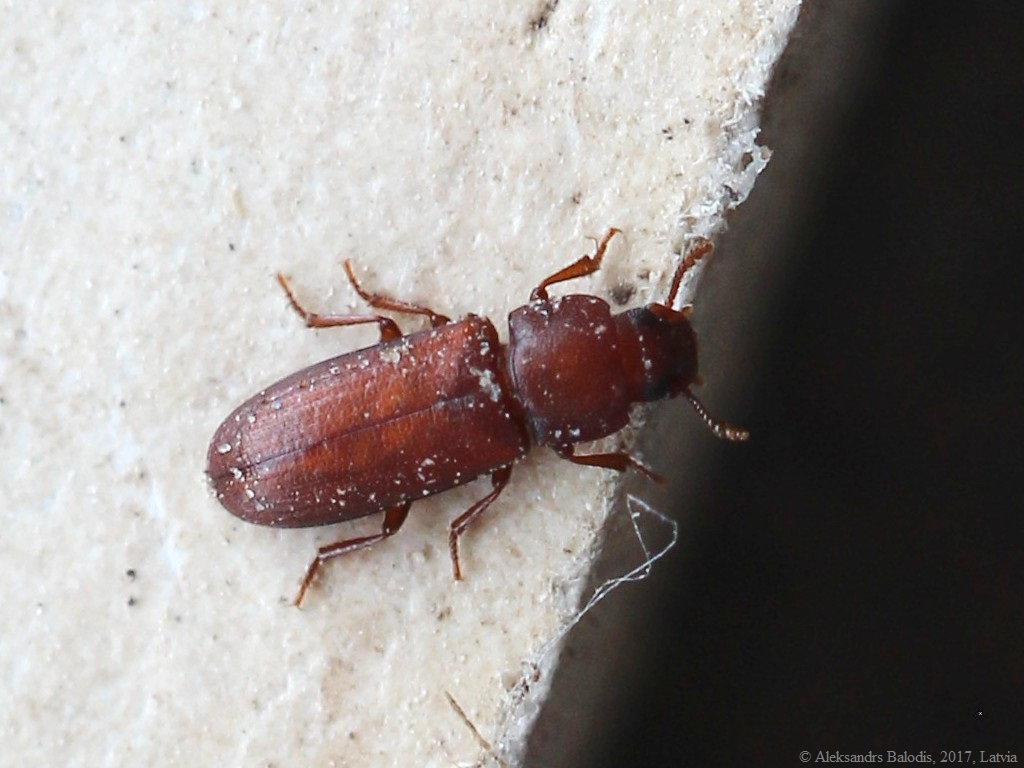
Tribolium confusum

While the beetle is able to feed off many grain sources, one study has shown that the beetle displays the best amount of growth from a mixed diet of wheat bran, endosperm, and germ in equal proportions as opposed to any of the diets individually. The different diet types varied in how easily digestible the food source was and how well the food was efficiently utilized, and the mixed diet was both easily digestible and the digested food could be easily utilized for growth.

== Social behavior ==
=== Cannibalism ===
Cannibalistic pathways in the confused flour beetle are important for affecting survival of different population life stages. Cannibalism in this beetle has been observed to be strongest with greater differences in mobility. Adults and larvae cannibalizing on eggs are the most common behavior, but adults cannibalizing pupae and larvae have also been seen. However, adults do not cannibalize other adults. Confused flour beetles use cannibalism as a method for population control. On the contrary, cannibalism is used in small population sizes to reduce extinction risk. Females beetles have also been shown to cannibalize more often than males.

Cannibalism has extreme effects on population size largely due to genetic and environmental factors. Cannibalism can cause up to tenfold differences in population size between varying populations. There are two strains of confused flour beetle, one with low rates of cannibalism, and the other with high rates. Low-cannibalism strains have high survival rates in both nutritionally sufficient and insufficient environments, but high-cannibalism strains have low rates of survival when not fed eggs. However, their survival rates match those of the low-cannibalism strains when fed eggs, meaning that high-cannibalism strains use eggs to compensate their diet in low-nutrition environments.

Cannibalism is used as a method for direct gains, primarily nutritional value. Higher rates of cannibalism tend to occur in environments with low nutritional value and high stress. Low-cannibalism and high-cannibalism behaviors show distinct genetic variability between different strains, and cannibalism in the confused flour beetle is a polygenic trait that is autosomally inherited. The genetic variability between the strains has been maintained for over 60 generations, and it is likely that this stability has either been maintained by stabilizing selection or that cannibalism is neutrally evolving.

Cannibalistic behaviors can also be controlled. When exposed to sublethal levels of diatomaceous earth (DE), the number of eggs produced decreases, but the rate of cannibalism decreases further, which causes an overall increase in net fecundity. While DE can be used to control population size in the confused flour beetle, it needs to be used carefully because high levels of DE can be fatal for both adults and larvae. In addition, DE can vary due to factors such as pH, SiO_{2} content, particle shape, and particle size, so the proper amount of DE to inhibit cannibalism can depend both on the type of DE used and the beetle strain present.

== Life cycle ==
The eggs, larvae, and pupae from confused flour beetles are similar to those of the red flour beetle. They start out white when in the egg stage, followed by a creamy yellow color in the larval stage, which turn to light brown as it ages. It finally becomes reddish-brown in the adult stage. Larvae typically feed on flour and processed grain such as cornmeal and flour. The metamorphosis from egg to adult can take between 40 and 90 days, and adults can live for three years. Female confused flour beetles are capable of laying 200–500 eggs during their life span. The beetle can be found in grain supplies at any stage of its life.

== Parasitoids ==
The majority of the confused flour beetle's natural predators are pathogens. However, one parasitoid's behaviors, H. sylvanidis, have been studied in detail. The flour beetles release a chemical signal that stimulates an olfactory response in H. sylvanidis, which lays eggs in the flour beetles. A study has shown that the parasitoid is not attracted to uninfested grain storages, but rather to the majority of life stages of the flour beetle. However, the parasitoid is more attracted to Tribolium castaneum, which inhabits areas similar to those of Tribolium confusum.

Confused flour beetles face threats from various other predators, parasitoids, and pathogens. Among these, the anthocorid predatory bug Xylocoris flavipes, parasitic wasps such as Holepyris sylvanidis, and a range of pathogens, including bacteria, fungi, and protozoa, are recognized for their ability to inflict harm upon these beetles.

== Mating ==
=== Sexual selection ===
Male beetles produce a hormone that attracts both males and females. Females tend to mate with many males and apportions paternity among her many mates. Females have the ability to reject spermatophore transfer if they decide that the male has a low quality phenotype, but there is also evidence that suggests males practice leg-rubbing mechanisms during copulation to counter female spermatophore rejection. Males, in turn, are more likely to approach virgin females. Females usually fill their spermatheca mostly with whichever beetle they first copulate with.

Confused flour beetles practice kin selection. In a closed system where migration is not allowed, siblings will rear the larvae, causing them to become fully developed on average 2.2 days earlier than larvae reared in unrelated groups. This effect is likely due to the presence of related individuals rather than simply being an act of altruism. When individuals are more differentiated from each other, patterns of larval interactions shift. The evolution of kin selection may have been maintained to reduce levels of inbreeding and cannibalism, thus increasing individual fitness.

Tribolium c. practice asymmetrical mating. When virgin males approach virgin females, they are most successful mating from the left side of the females. However, this is partially influenced by the beetle more often to approach from the left overall. Uniquely, the beetles are the least successful mating approaching from the rear. Proportionally, a beetle choosing to approach from directly behind a female is the least likely to succeed in mating.

== Mutualism ==
The confused flour beetle displays mutualistic behaviors with the Wolbachia bacteria. The Wolbachia bacteria can display either mutualistic or parasitic behaviors depending on the species it infects, but for the confused flour beetle, it exhibits mutualism. Wolbachia induces cytoplasmic incompatibility (CI), which is the mechanism through which Wolbachia is able to spread to multiple hosts rapidly using positive frequency-dependent selection. Female beetles infected with Wolbachia have abnormally high fecundity regardless of male infection status, which increases CI and creates more infected Wolbachia hosts. The infection status did not influence male mate choice or mating performance. Heat stress also did not have an effect on mate choice, as the sex ratio did not change between the optimal temperature and heat-stressed conditions. Infection also changes sleep behavior of the beetle, as uninfected individuals are disturbed more frequently during sleep than infected individuals. This behavior is similarly seen in that of Wolbachia infections in Drosophila.

Wolbachia bacteria also influence locomotion in the beetles. Infected beetles tend to be less centrophobic and avoid wall-following behavior, while antibiotic-treated beetles tend to be more stationary and centrophobic. Infected females end up exploring 32% more area than uninfected females, which result in a greater number of interactions with males. This leads to increased mating opportunities, and this in addition to cytoplasmic incompatibility cause faster spread of the bacteria.

Wolbachia bacterial infection is maternally transmitted and associated with CI. In cases of uninfected females mating with infected males, this results in complete incompatibility, where no progeny can be observed from this cross. Compatibility can be traced back to the strains, where even though strains can be genetically distinct from one another, they have a single common compatibility type. It is also common to see multiple Wolbachia strains causing single infection events.

== Pest control ==
Beetle infestation can occur in areas with even minuscule amounts of grain, so managing their infestation must be done carefully. Infested grain can be treated by storing in a freezer for four or five days, as beetles cannot survive longer than this in such cold conditions. Infested grain can also be disposed of, and it should be replaced with new grain that is tightly sealed and does not have any leaks or gaps in the packaging. Any sources of grain that may be infested with beetles should not be purchased.

Heat combined with diatomaceous earth has been reported to be an effective population control. This combination kills adults in less time and lower temperature than either alone. Since this process is non-toxic, it can be used in grain mills without negative side effects. In addition, some equipment and structures cannot tolerate higher heat conditions, which is mitigated by combining the heat with dust.

Synergized pyrethrin can also be used as a method of population control. Pyrethrin can act as an aerosol that acts on all larval stages of the confused flour beetle. Direct exposure to pyrethrin (i.e. adding aerosol to the beetles) had the greatest impact, with an 88% mortality rate, while indirect exposure via adding the aerosol to the flour source of the beetles had a reduced mortality. Indirect exposure also had a greater recovery rate than the direct exposure, and larvae and adults were more tolerant to the aerosol than the eggs and pupae.

It has also been shown that insecticides such as spinosad and Beauveria bassiana, which is fungal based, can be used to manage flour beetle populations. Other insecticides such as aluminum phosphide do induce mortality, but they have significant consequences affecting humans and are costly. Spinosad and Beauveria bassiana experience varying mortality rates with different conditions, primarily temperature variation. Spinosad works most effectively at 22 °C, while Beauveria bassiana works most effectively at 25 °C. However, other factors such as microclimatic effects and humidity should also be taken into account when determining the effectiveness of these insecticides. Insecticides can be used as a more effective method of population control over pumping air, which is another method that works by changing air temperature. This method loses efficiency as climatic changes occur.

== See also ==
- Home stored product entomology
