= Telescoping generations =

Reproduction without ovum fertilization

Telescoping generations can occur in parthenogenetic species, such as aphids or other life forms that have the ability to reproduce without ovum fertilization. This occurrence is characterized by a viviparous female having a daughter growing inside her that is also parthenogenetically pregnant with a daughter cell.

This pattern of reproduction can also occur in certain mites that are not parthenogenetic, e.g. Adactylidium, in which the young hatch and mate within the mother, eating her from the inside and then escaping; in some species the males never escape, and in others they die shortly afterwards. The females are thus not actually pregnant on hatching, but rather become pregnant before emerging into free living. However, the resulting inbreeding has consequences much like those of parthenogenesis.
