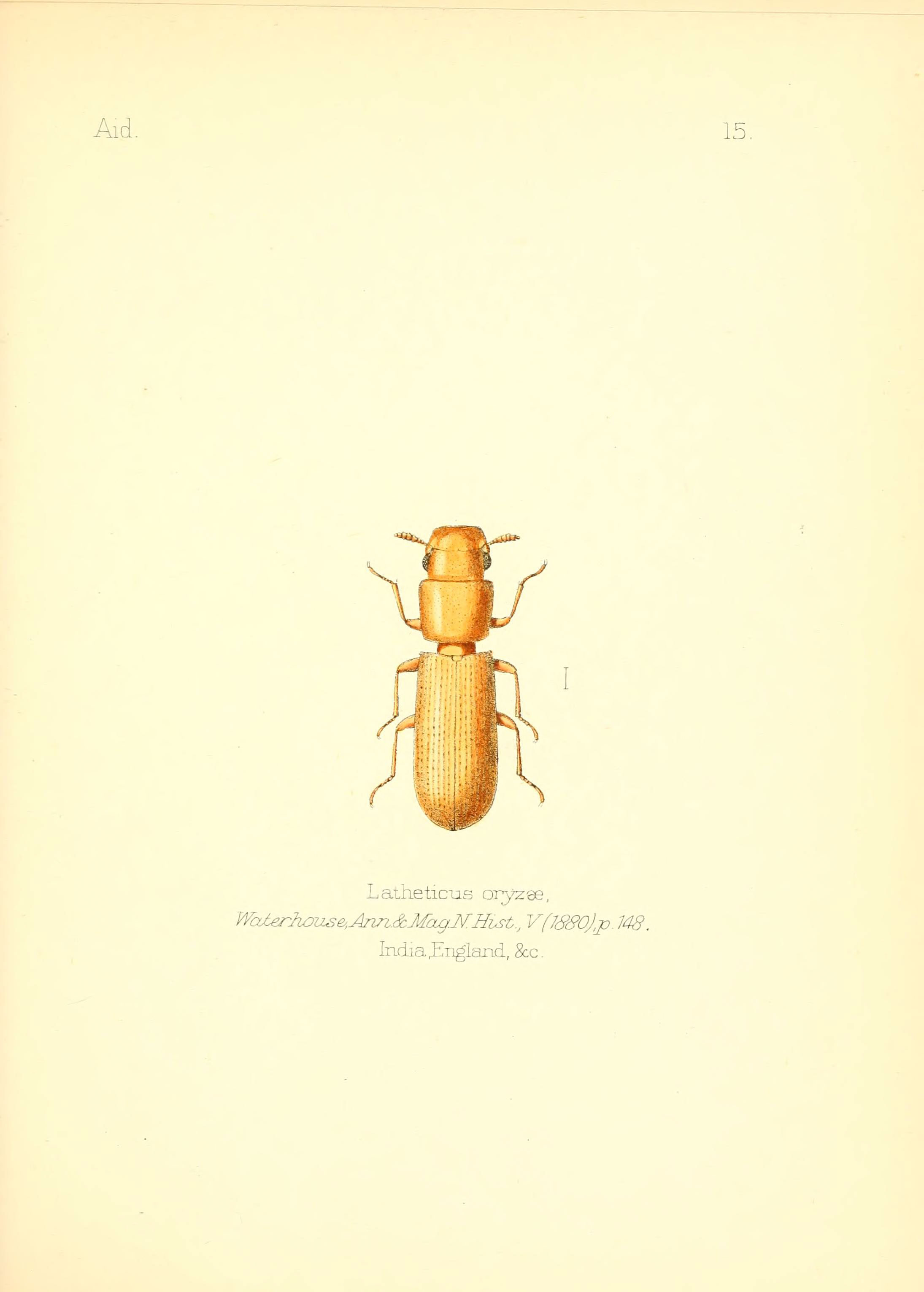
- Illustration of Latheticus oryzae

Scientific classification
- Domain: Eukaryota
- Kingdom: Animalia
- Phylum: Arthropoda
- Class: Insecta
- Order: Coleoptera
- Suborder: Polyphaga
- Infraorder: Cucujiformia
- Family: Tenebrionidae
- Genus: Latheticus
- Species: L. oryzae

Binomial name
- Latheticus oryzae Waterhouse, 1880

= Latheticus oryzae =

Species of beetle

Latheticus oryzae (common name long headed flour beetle) is a species of beetle.

== Description ==
This beetle is light brown in color with elongated body measuring 2-3 mm. It resembles Tribolium casteneum..

== Diet ==
Both adult and grub feed on a milled product and can exist as a secondary infestation in stored grains. It attacks cereals, flour, packaged food, rice and rice products.

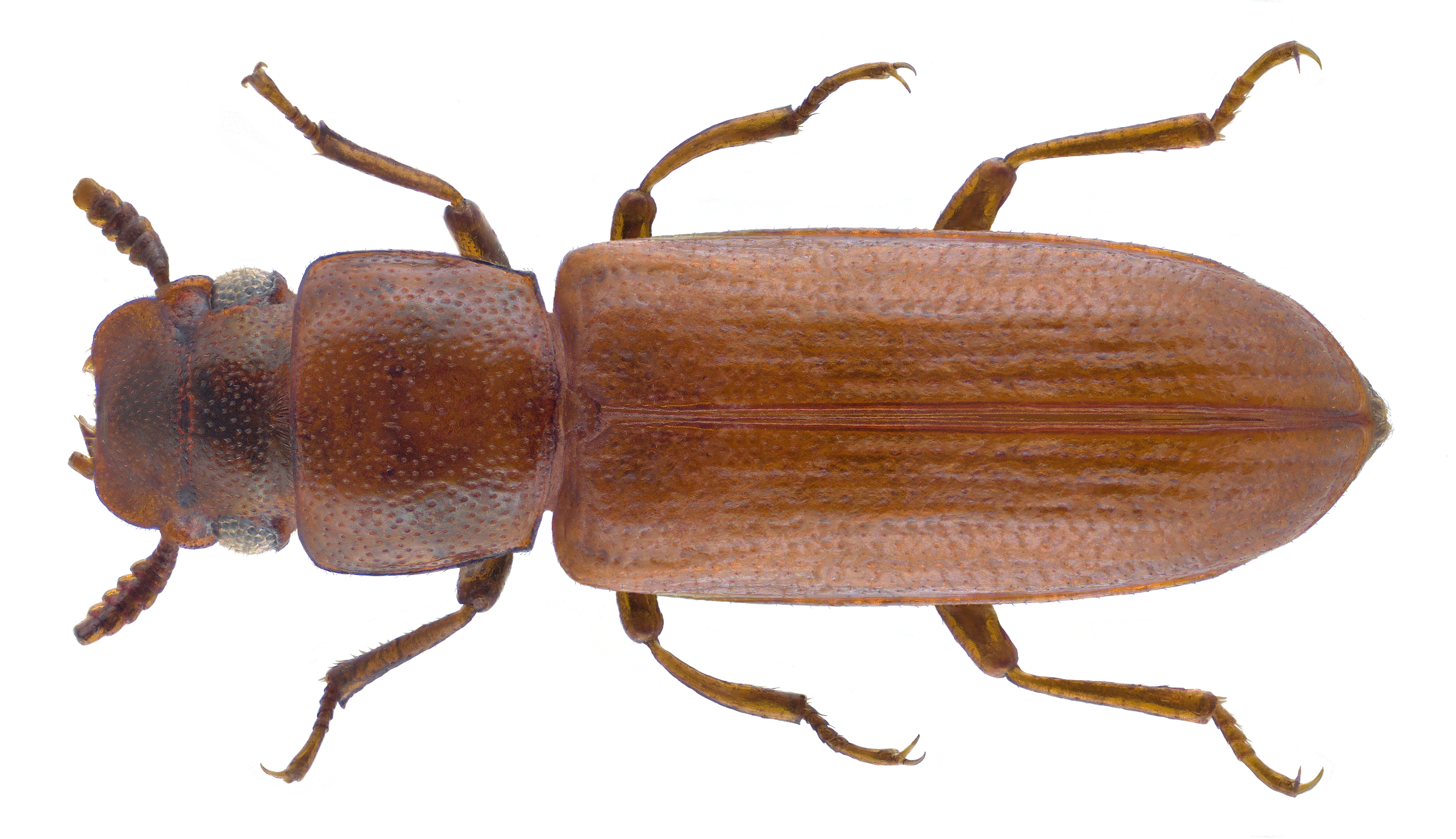
Latheticus oryzae adult dorsal view

== Reproduction ==
The female lays 400 white eggs on grains.
