= Acarophenacidae =

Acarophenacidae Temporal range: Cretaceous–present

Scientific classification
- Kingdom: Animalia
- Phylum: Arthropoda
- Subphylum: Chelicerata
- Class: Arachnida
- Order: Trombidiformes
- Family: Acarophenacidae; Cross, 1965

Genera
- Acarophenax Newstead & Duvall, 1918; Adactylidium Cross, 1965; Aegyptophenax Rady, 1992; Aethiophenax Mahunka, 1981; Paracarophenax Cross, 1965; Paradactylidium Mahunka, 1973; Proadactylidium Khaustov et al., 2021; Protophenax Magowski, 1994

Family of mites

Acarophenacidae is a family of mites in the order Trombidiformes that are egg parasitoids and ectoparasites of beetles or thrips. It contains eight genera and around 40 species.

== Morphology ==
Acarophenacidae are <200 μm in length and elongate to oval in shape. Distinguishing features are the gnathosoma (mouthparts) partially/completely fused into the propodosoma, indistinct palps and the first leg pair being thickest.

== Life cycle ==
Acarophenacidae have a reduced life cycle, in which the larvae complete their development within their mother; the entire life cycle can take only 4–5 days.

1. A mated female rides on an adult insect to disperse to new areas. In genus Adactylidium, she also feeds on the insect's body fluids.
2. When the insect begins laying eggs, the female drops off to feed on the eggs. Her abdomen swells up greatly (physogastrism).
3. Offspring develop within the mother. The sex ratio is female-skewed; in Acarophenax mahunkai for example, an individual female produces 27.2 daughters but only 1.7 sons on average.
4. Male offspring develop slightly more quickly than their sisters and inseminate them while still inside the mother's body.
5. Females leave the mother's body and seek hosts, beginning the cycle again.

== Biological control ==
Some Acarophenacidae have been suggested as biological control agents as they reduce populations of their hosts. These include Acarophenax mahunkai for the lesser mealworm (Alphitobius diaperinus), and Acarophenax lacunatus for red flour beetle (Tribolium castaneum) and lined flat bark beetle (Cryptolestes ferrugineus).
