= Adactylidium =

Scientific classification
- Kingdom: Animalia
- Phylum: Arthropoda
- Subphylum: Chelicerata
- Class: Arachnida
- Order: Trombidiformes
- Family: Acarophenacidae
- Genus: Adactylidium; Cross, 1965

Species
- Adactylidium beeri; Adactylidium costarricensis; Adactylidium brasiliensis; Adactylidium crespii; Adactylidium ficorum; Adactylidium flechtmanni; Adactylidium irregularis; Adactylidium lindquisti; Adactylidium mooniensis; Adactylidium morazae; Adactylidium moundi; Adactylidium nicolae; Adactylidium rumanicus; Adactylidium smileyi

Genus of Arachnida

Adactylidium is a genus of mites known for its unusual life cycle. An impregnated female mite feeds upon a single egg of a thrips, rapidly growing five to eight female offspring and one male in her body. The single male mite mates with all his sisters when they are still inside their mother. The new females, now impregnated, eat their way out of their mother's body so that they can emerge to find new thrips eggs, killing their mother in the process (though the mother may be only 4 days old at the time), starting the cycle again. The male emerges as well, but does not look for food or new mates, and dies after a few hours.

== See also ==
- Telescoping generations
