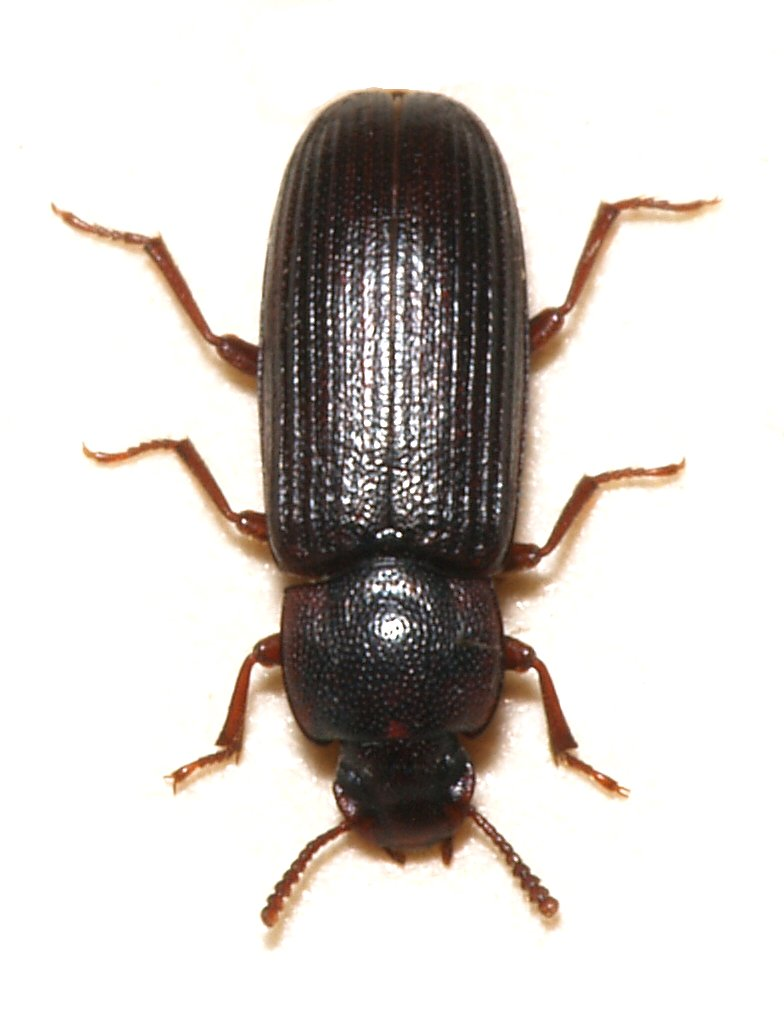

Scientific classification
- Domain: Eukaryota
- Kingdom: Animalia
- Phylum: Arthropoda
- Class: Insecta
- Order: Coleoptera
- Suborder: Polyphaga
- Infraorder: Cucujiformia
- Family: Tenebrionidae
- Genus: Tribolium
- Species: T. destructor

Binomial name
- Tribolium destructor Uyttenboogaart, 1934

= Destructive flour beetle =

Species of beetle

The destructive or dark flour beetle (Tribolium destructor), is one of the species of darkling beetle known generally as flour beetles. It is a common pest insect known for attacking and infesting stored flour and grain.

It is a very dark brown beetle (darker than other Tribolium species) 5–6 mm long. T. destructor is found in North America, Europe and Africa. In addition to damaging flour and grain, it attacks animal food pellets, rolled oats, and poultry feed.

== See also ==
- Home stored product entomology
