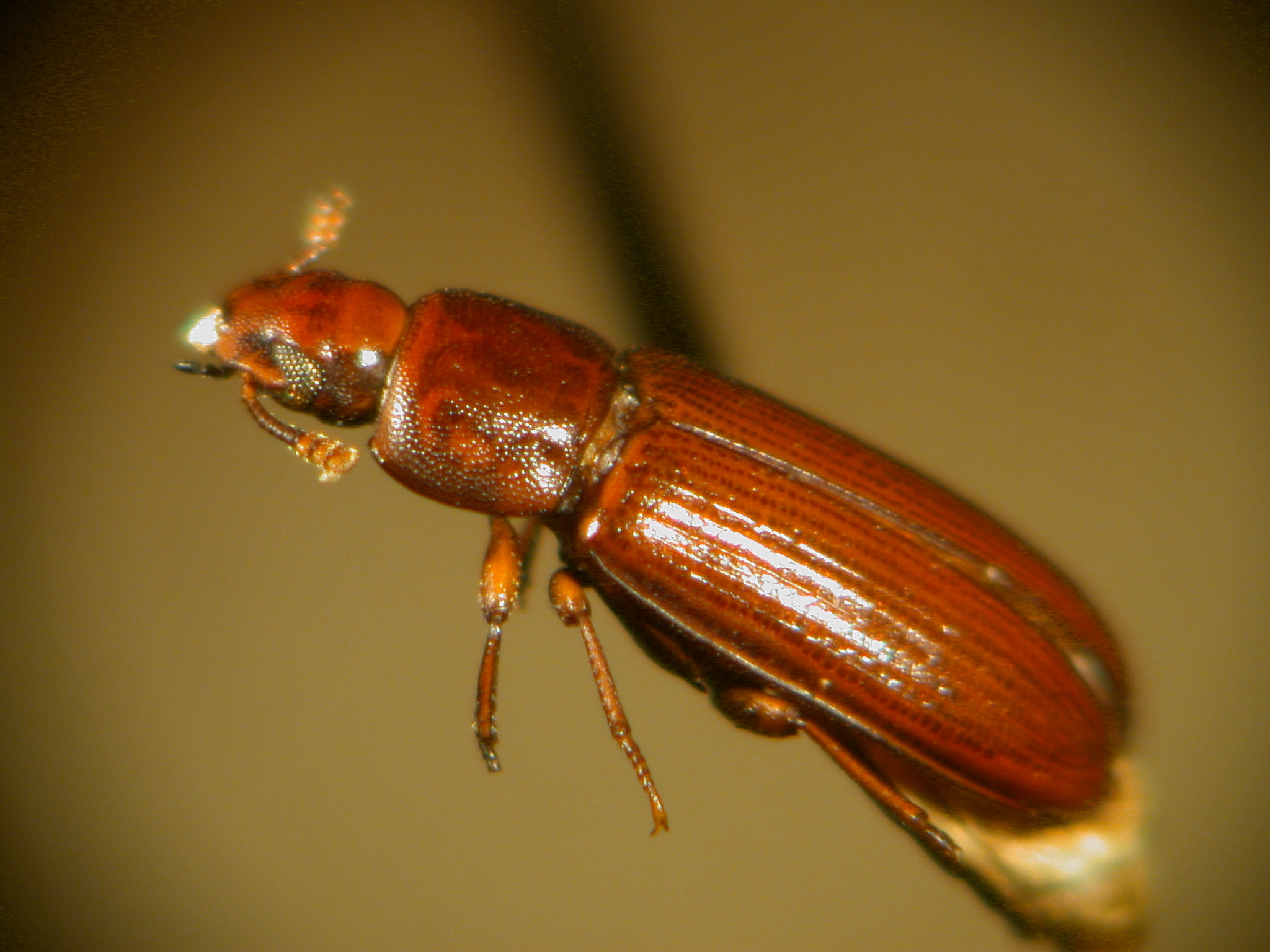
- Tribolium castaneum

Scientific classification
- Kingdom: Animalia
- Phylum: Arthropoda
- Clade: Pancrustacea
- Class: Insecta
- Order: Coleoptera
- Suborder: Polyphaga
- Infraorder: Cucujiformia
- Family: Tenebrionidae
- Subfamily: Tenebrioninae
- Tribe: Triboliini
- Genus: Tribolium; Macleay 1825

= Tribolium (beetle) =

Genus of beetles

Tribolium is a genus of flour beetles in the family Tenebrionidae. They are known by various common names including flour beetles, flour weevils, red weevils and bran bugs.

== Description ==
Adult Tribolium are beetles 3–6 mm in length and with colours ranging from reddish-brown to black. The clypeus is enlarged and has genae forming shelf-like projections extending around the sides, partly dividing the eyes. The antennae are 11-segmented and either expand towards the ends or have terminal clubs. The prothorax is nearly square in shape and rounded on the sides. The elytra are striated. They possess well-developed wings, but at least one species (T. confusum) is unable to use them to fly. The two sexes are similar in external appearance, i.e. there is no sexual dimorphism.

The eggs are 0.6 mm long, oblong in shape and whitish to nearly transparent in colour.

The larvae are elongate and approximately 6–7 mm long when mature. They can be distinguished from some other tenebrionid larvae by the last abdominal segment ending in two points (urogomphi). They are mostly yellowish-white except for: the dorsal part of the head, the tips of the claws and the tergites, which are slightly darkened; and the urogomphi and the tips of the mandibles, which are reddish-brown.

The pupae are initially white, but turn yellow after a day or two, then gradually turn darker.

== Habitat ==
In the wild, Tribolium occur under bark and in old logs. A number of species have adapted to living in stored plant products.

== Life cycle ==
Tribolium lay their eggs in a food source such as flour. These hatch into larvae which proceed to feed and grow within the food, avoiding light. There are usually 7 or 8 larval instars, but there can be as few as 5 or as many as 11 depending on food, temperature and humidity. The larval stage can take 22 days to over 100 days, depending on food, temperature and species (T. confusum takes longer to develop than T. castaneum). Once development is complete, larvae come to the surface of their food or to some sheltered space or crack, where they become pupae. They use empty pupal cells left behind by Mediterranean flour moths when available. The pupal stage lasts for 5–12 days depending on temperature and light. Adults emerge from pupae to continue the next generation. Adults are among the longest-lived of stored product insects, able to survive for over three years. Males (but not females) can continue reproducing even after their third year.

== Distribution ==
The original distribution of Tribolium is suspected to be in the region of India, southwestern Asia and the eastern Mediterranean. The genus has since spread worldwide via human trade.

== Pest status ==
Two species of Tribolium, T. castaneum and T. confusum, are probably the most common secondary pests of stored plant products. A few other species are occasional minor pests.

They are known to feed on wheat, maize, flour, starch, peas, beans, nuts, dried fruit, spices and herbarium specimens, and food products made from these such as bread and cakes. They cannot attack intact grains, seeds or nuts, but can do so if these products are broken/cracked. They can also attack animal products such as preserved insect specimens, hides, bird skins and milk powder.

Both adults and larvae cause damage. They produce toxic quinones which contaminate plant products. Tribolium species may be intermediate hosts of the cestode Hymenolepis diminuta after they ingest ova containing hexacanth larvae that invade the intestine and develop into tissue cysticerci infectious to rodents that ingest the insect.

== Natural enemies ==
Tribolium can be infected by protozoans of the genus Adelina.

They are parasitised by various mites, an example being the acarophenacid mite Acarophenax lacunatus which feeds on the eggs.

The parasitoid wasp Holepyris sylvanidis feeds on Tribolium larvae and pupae, and lays its eggs on the larvae.

The lyctocorid bug Xylocoris cursitans is presumed to feed on the larvae. Mice are another (occasional predator) of the beetles.

== Phylogeny ==
Phylogenetic analysis of the genus Tribolium indicates that it has two species groups, castaneum and confusum, which are both monophyletic and are most closely related to each other. Several species which were once in the genus, such as T. brevicornis and its relatives, have since been removed to genus Aphanotus.

== Species ==
The genus contains the following species:

- Tribolium alcinae Hinton, 1948
- Tribolium anaphe Hinton, 1948
- Tribolium antennatum Hinton, 1948
- Tribolium apiculum Neboiss, 1962
- Tribolium arndti Grimm, 2001
- Tribolium audax Halstead 1969 – American black flour beetle
- Tribolium beccarii Gridelli, 1950
- Tribolium bremeri Grimm, 2001
- Tribolium castaneum (Herbst, 1797) – Red flour beetle
- Tribolium ceto Hinton, 1948
- Tribolium confusum Jaquelin Du Val, 1868 – Confused flour beetle
- Tribolium cylindricum Hinton, 1948
- Tribolium destructor Uyttenboogaart, 1934 – Large flour beetle, destructive flour beetle, false black flour beetle, dark flour beetle
- Tribolium downesi Hinton, 1948
- Tribolium ferreri Grimm, 2001
- Tribolium ferrugineum (Fabricius, 1781)
- Tribolium freemani Hinton 1948 – Kashmir flour beetle
- Tribolium giganteum Hinton, 1948
- Tribolium indicum Blair, 1930
- Tribolium madens (Charpentier 1825) – Black flour beetle
- Tribolium myrmecophilum Lea, 1904
- Tribolium namibiensis Grimm, 2008
- Tribolium parki Hinton, 1948
- Tribolium politum Hinton, 1948
- Tribolium quadricollis (Fairmaire, 1902)
- Tribolium semele Hinton, 1948
- Tribolium semicostatum (Gebien, 1910)
- Tribolium sulmo Hinton, 1948
- Tribolium thusa Hinton, 1948
- Tribolium waterhousei Hinton, 1948

For T. brevicornis, T. carinatum, T. gebieni, T. parallelus, T. linsleyi, T. setosum, and T. uezumii, see Aphanotus.
