= Latheticus =

Scientific classification
- Kingdom: Animalia
- Phylum: Arthropoda
- Class: Insecta
- Order: Coleoptera
- Suborder: Polyphaga
- Infraorder: Cucujiformia
- Family: Tenebrionidae
- Subfamily: Tenebrioninae
- Tribe: Triboliini
- Genus: Latheticus; Waterhouse, 1880

Genus of insects

Latheticus is a genus of beetles belonging to the family Tenebrionidae.

The genus has almost cosmopolitan distribution.

Species:

- Latheticus oryzae Waterhouse, 1880
- Latheticus prosopis Chittenden, 1904
