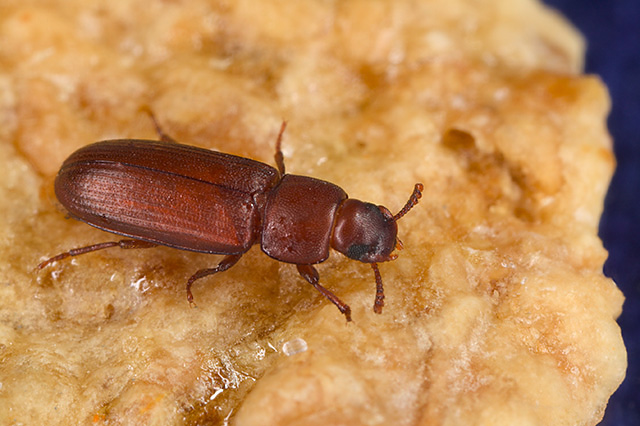
- Tribolium castaneum

Scientific classification
- Domain: Eukaryota
- Kingdom: Animalia
- Phylum: Arthropoda
- Class: Insecta
- Order: Coleoptera
- Suborder: Polyphaga
- Infraorder: Cucujiformia
- Family: Tenebrionidae
- Subfamily: Tenebrioninae
- Tribe: Triboliini; Gistel, 1848

= Triboliini =

Tribe of beetles

Triboliini is a tribe of darkling beetles in the family Tenebrionidae. There are about 10 genera in Triboliini.

== Genera ==
These genera belong to the tribe Triboliini:

- Aesymnus Champion, 1886 (the Neotropics)
- Hypogena Dejean, 1834 (North America and the Neotropics)
- Latheticus C.O. Waterhouse, 1880 (North America, the Palearctic, Indomalaya, and Oceania)
- Lyphia Mulsant & Rey, 1859 (North America, tropical Africa, Indomalaya, Australasia, and Oceania)
- Metulosonia Bates, 1873 (the Neotropics)
- Mycotrogus Horn, 1870 (North America and the Neotropics)
- Platybolium Blair, 1938 (Indomalaya)
- Spelaebiosis Bousquet & Bouchard, 2018 (the Neotropics)
- Tribolium W.S. MacLeay, 1825 (flour beetles) (worldwide)
- Xenogloeus Wollaston, 1861 (tropical Africa)
