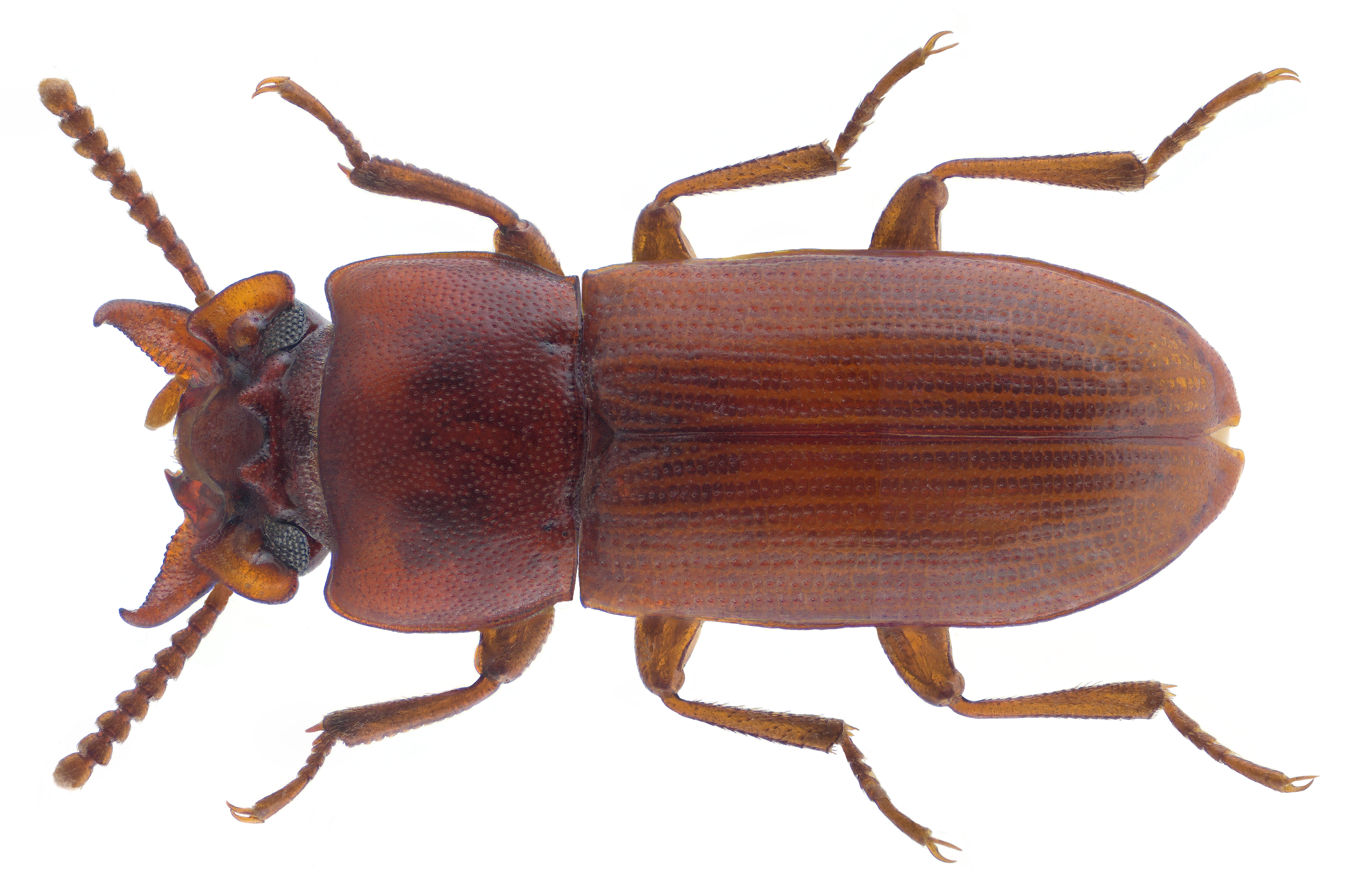
- Gnatocerus cornutus

Scientific classification
- Kingdom: Animalia
- Phylum: Arthropoda
- Clade: Pancrustacea
- Class: Insecta
- Order: Coleoptera
- Suborder: Polyphaga
- Infraorder: Cucujiformia
- Family: Tenebrionidae
- Tribe: Diaperini
- Genus: Gnatocerus; Thunberg, 1814

= Gnatocerus =

Genus of beetles

Gnatocerus is a genus of beetles belonging to the family Tenebrionidae. The genus was described by Carl Peter Thunberg in 1814. The genus is commonly misspelled as "Gnathocerus", assuming that "gnato-" was a misspelling of the Greek gnatho-, referring to the jaw.

The species of this genus are found in Europe, Africa and America.

Species:

- Gnatocerus cornutus (Fabricius, 1798)
- Gnatocerus maxillosus (Fabricius, 1810)
