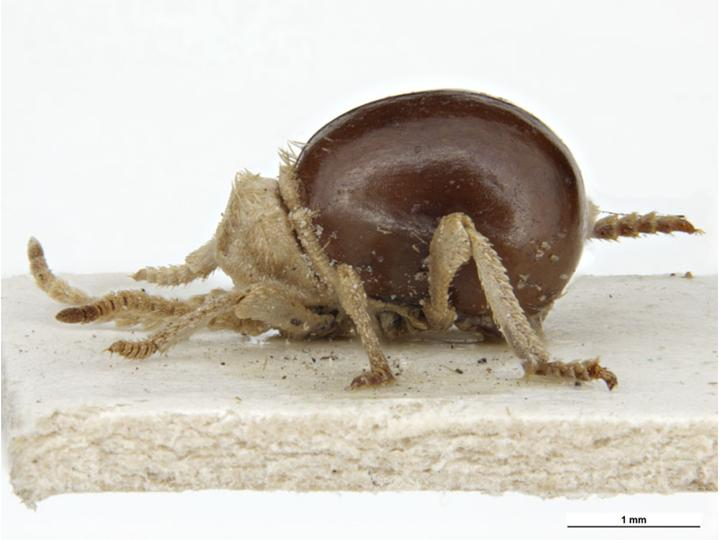

Scientific classification
- Kingdom: Animalia
- Phylum: Arthropoda
- Clade: Pancrustacea
- Class: Insecta
- Order: Coleoptera
- Suborder: Polyphaga
- Family: Ptinidae
- Genus: Mezium
- Species: M. americanum

Binomial name
- Mezium americanum Laporte de Castelnau, 1840

= Mezium americanum =

Species of beetle

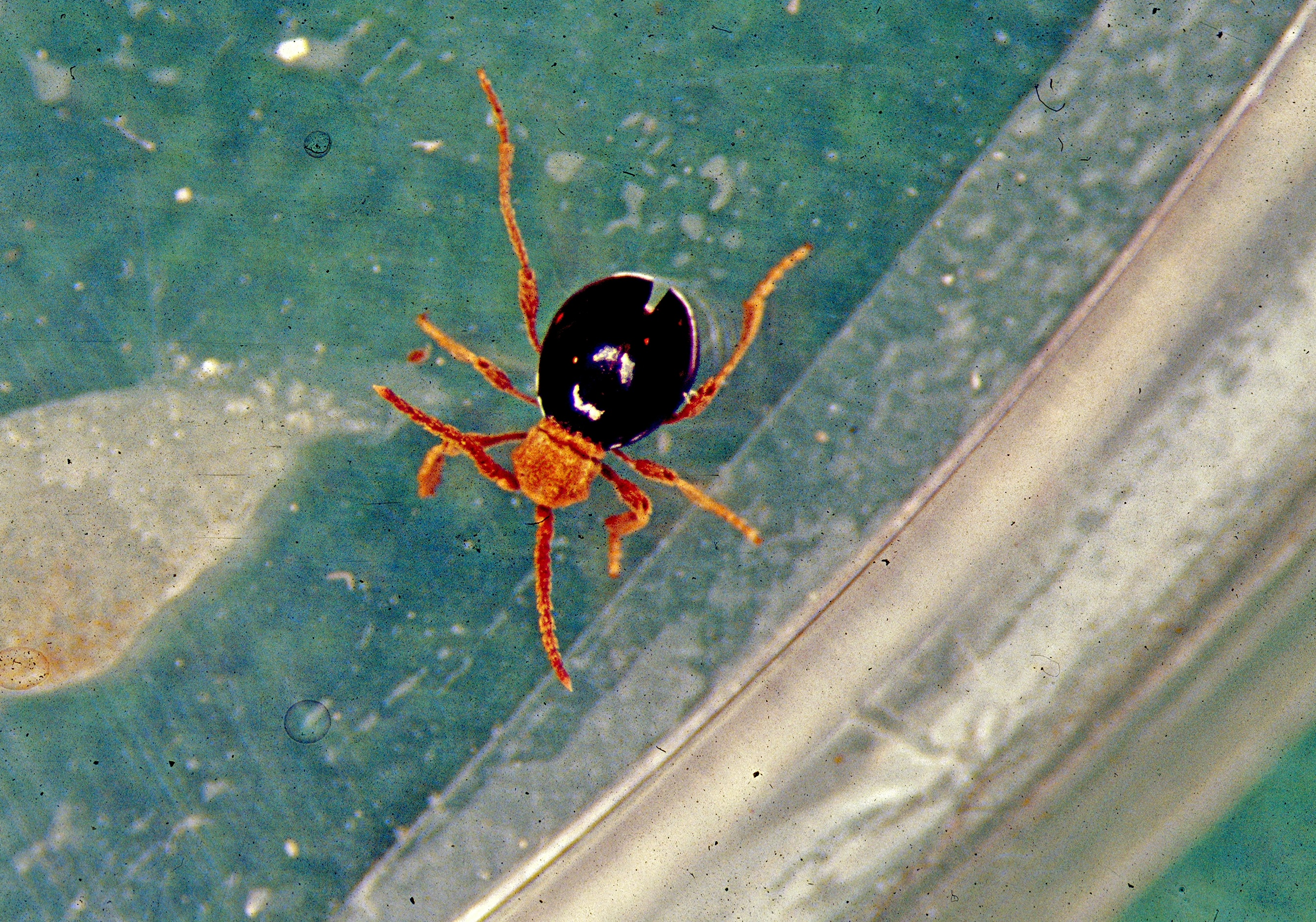
Mezium americanum

Mezium americanum, the American spider beetle or black spider beetle, is a species of beetle in the subfamily Ptininae, the spider beetles. These are sometimes mistaken for spiders or mites because of their rounded abdomens and long legs. It has a cosmopolitan distribution, but it is an exotic species in Australia.

== Description ==
The beetle is about 1.5 to 3.5 millimetres (0.059 to 0.138 in) long. Its body is dull yellow and hairy, and the elytra are a glossy black or reddish. It has a nearly cylindrical thorax with blunt projections on each side. The antennae and legs are long and slender and pale brown to yellow in color. The larva is C-shaped and cream-colored with a brown head.

== Impacts ==
Like many other spider beetles, this species feeds on stored animal and vegetable products, including foodstuffs. It lives on nuts, beans, seeds, spices, cacao, and powdered chocolate, cereals and meal, dried fruits, herbs, and mushrooms, soup powder, fish meal, and bread. Other products it consumes include leather and animal skins, bones, feathers, dried feces, silk, wool, textiles, old wood, books, and dead insects and specimens, including taxidermy. It is known to feed on cayenne pepper, tobacco, and opium.
