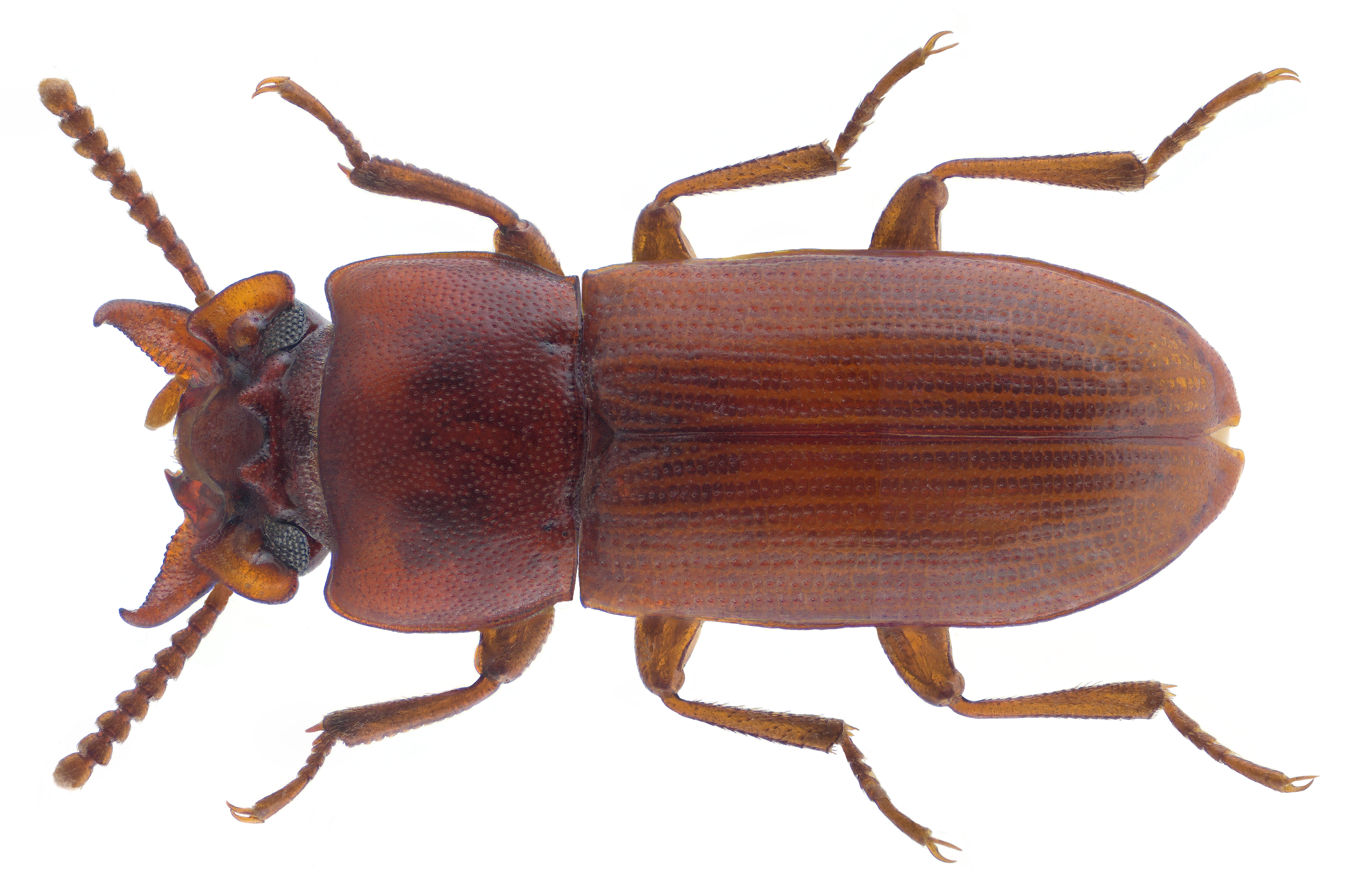
- Male broadhorned flour beetle

Scientific classification
- Kingdom: Animalia
- Phylum: Arthropoda
- Class: Insecta
- Order: Coleoptera
- Suborder: Polyphaga
- Infraorder: Cucujiformia
- Family: Tenebrionidae
- Genus: Gnatocerus
- Species: G. cornutus

Binomial name
- Gnatocerus cornutus Fabricius, 1798

= Gnatocerus cornutus =

Species of beetle

Gnatocerus cornutus, or the broadhorned flour beetle, is a common species of beetle in the Tenebrionidae family. It is distributed worldwide and is commonly found in warm, tropical regions, preferring grains, yeasts, and flours as its main diet. The total development time is about 47 days. G. cornutus is predominately found in mills as a storage pest and has a wide distribution.

The beetle undergoes four developmental stages, with diet quality and larval density influencing development rates and body size. Nutrition plays a crucial role, with higher-calorie diets leading to enhanced survival and faster development. Genetics also impact traits like mandible length, regulated by specific peptides and transcription factors.

Male-male competition for mates is fierce, with larger weapons indicating better fighting ability and increased reproductive success. Female mate choice varies based on competitive or non-competitive mating situations. Environmental factors like nutritional availability influence offspring sex ratios and reproductive strategies like polyandry. Oviposition patterns and larval development are also affected by environmental conditions, with larval size determining pupation success.

The biology, behavior, and reproductive strategies of G. cornutus are finely tuned to its ecological niche and environmental pressures.

== Morphology ==
The broadhorned flour beetle is about 3.5 to 4.5 mm long and is red-brown in color. The males have a pair of broad, stout horns on their mandibles. These beetles show sexual dimorphism, with males exhibiting larger body sizes and distinctive characteristics such as enlarged mandibles, widened genae, and two small horns on the vertex. These physical traits are not observed in females.

== Habitat ==
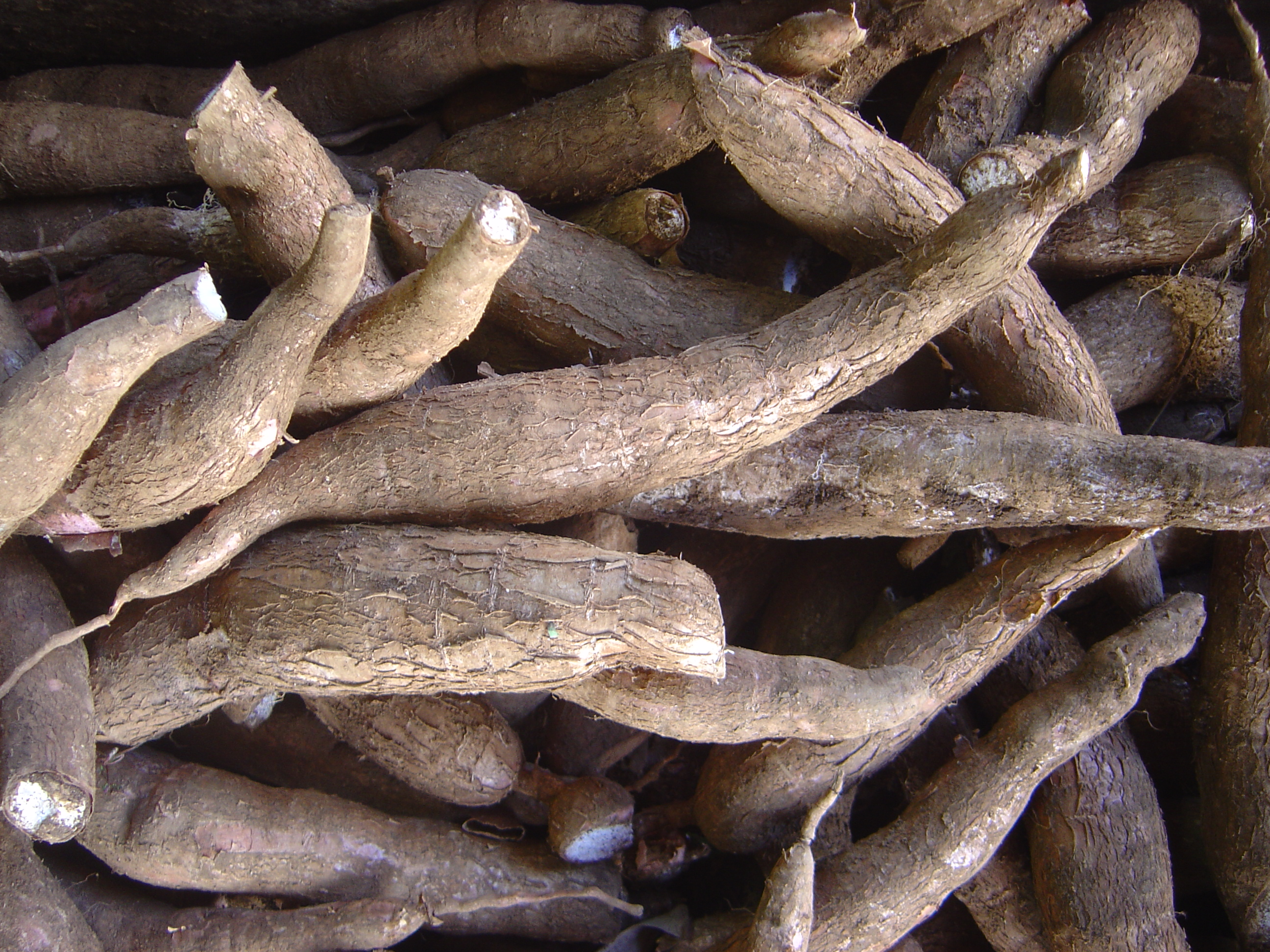
Cassava root

The broadhorned flour beetle is a stored product insect found all around the world, more commonly in warm, tropical areas. In warmer regions, this beetle is often found in cassava root and cotton, whereas in the colder regions such as the temperate climate of the UK, it is often found in flour and provender mills. This is due to their increased susceptibility to colder climates and innate desire to shelter from the cold.

== Diet and development ==
Gnatocerus cornutus mainly feed on various types of grain, yeasts, and flours.

The broadhorned flour beetle undergoes 4 major life stages: egg, larvae, pupa, and adult. The total developmental time is about 47 days, about 1.5 times longer than the Tribolium castaneum, or red flour beetle. In the larval stages of broad-horned flour beetles, the quality of their diet influences their development rate without affecting their survival significantly. Larvae with poor quality diets can survive, although they experience a prolonged developmental period compared to those with access to higher food quality. The development rate of broad-horned flour beetles is also affected by larval density. As larval density increases, time for development from mature larvae to adults extends, affecting body size and secondary sexual traits. This delayed development is believed to be in response to heightened tactile stimulation between neighboring larvae. Increased larval density also increased mortality rate and cannibalism where larvae were seen eating pupae and other larvae.

Moreover, individuals consuming higher-calorie diets exhibit enhanced survival and faster development, growing larger much more quickly. These beetles are in better condition, enabling the allocation of resources to both naturally and sexually selected traits. The ratio of ingested nutrients proves critical for trait expression, with an optimal balance observed at a specific protein-to-carbohydrate ratio of 1:2. A carbohydrate rich diet is likely to enhance male fitness, improving offspring survival, development rate, and morphological traits whereas a protein rich diet is essential for the expression of sexually selective traits.

Although the genitalia of G. cornutus are subject to sexual selection, it is clear that the size of the aedeagus is not particularly sensitive to nutrition and is an unlikely signal of a male's underlying genetic quality. Males infected with parasites may have decreased horn size as resources are allocated towards building immune response. This reduction in horn size may limit mating opportunities for infected males.

== Genetics and heritability ==
One specific type of Insulin-Like Peptide (ILP), GcorILP2, has been shown to have an impact on nutritional signaling and promoting mandible growth. GcorILP2 positively correlates with nutrional condition and promotes the growth and development of mandibles along with increasing the size of the head and prothorax. GcorILP2 is primarily synthesized during the larval stage, specifically at the postfeeding metamorphic stage and is retained fat, retaining information on the beetle's nutritional state and directly coupling this nutritional condition with the growth of exaggerated traits in adult G. cornutus.

A transcription factor, zfp608, regulates gena morphogenesis in G. cornutus. Males naturally have lower quantities of zfp608, leading to the growth and widening of the gena. Females, on the other hand, have higher values of zfp608, suppressing gena growth and causing smaller genas than in males.

The length of male mandibles is heritable but can evolve based on the environmental pressures. There appears to be genetic correlations between the size of the mandibles and the size of the head, prothorax, and legs, which are all significantly larger if the beetle has large mandibles. In contrast, there seems to be no genetic correlation between the size of the mandibles and the size of the antenna, eye area, elytra length, and head horn (although having the head horn may aid the beetle in pushing away the opponent when their mandibles interlock).

=== Ornamentation ===
Sexually selected exaggerated traits such as mandible length, size of the gena, and horns on the vertex are all ornaments which confer mating advantages to males. However, these genes are costly if expressed in females which is why they are expressed at different levels amongst the sexes and regulated differently.

Juvenile hormones (JH) are involved in the regulation of moulting and metamorphosis of insects and is also associated with the exaggeration of sexually selected traits. It was found that the head size, gena, horn, and prothorax increased when exogenous JH was added to male broadhorned flour beetles, indicating that perhaps these body parts are associated with their mandibles, a sexually selected trait. Excess JH reduced the size of the male beetle's hindwing area and elytra length, along with reduced testes, illustrating the trade off between having enlarged weapons for competition and a reduction in reproductive organs and flight.

== Reproduction ==
=== Male-male competition ===
In male-male competition, the males show aggressive behavior such as interlocking horns, pushing, lifting their opponents, and biting. In general, the weapon size (mandibles) typically is larger with a larger body size. Males with larger weapons are typically better fighters and have enhanced fighting endurance

Males often compete against other males for access to mates to increase their reproductive success. In order to increase their reproductive fitness, males will often attempt to mate with several females. Because of this, fighting is common and males will often fight for mates at least twice in their life. Males that win these fights obtain mating success whereas mates that lose rarely find success.

Males that win fights normally establish local dominance over nests and will guard these areas against other males, maintaining their paternity. Males that lose fights have decreased competitive ability and may utilize other tactics to maximize their fitness, including wandering in search of females and sneaking behavior.

The experience of losing fights can affect male behavior. With each losing experience, the males reduced their attempts at attacking, often dispersing from the fight more quickly, thus decreasing the duration. However, after four days the effect of losing disappears, ending quite abruptly instead of a gradual decay. The males are able to fight normally on the fifth day without retreating or reducing their attempted attacks.

=== Sperm competition ===
Despite competitive males having high reproductive success due to forced copulation with females and defeating other males, they often transfer fewer sperm and have smaller testes. Thus, they are at a disadvantage in sperm competition. There is a smaller chance for competitive males to have offspring with the female as less sperm equates to a lower probability of fertilizing the females eggs. In contrast, attractive males which allocate their energy in courtship rather than weapon size, often can transfer more sperm, having an advantage against competitive males.

These two male strategies most likely depends on the population densities. In high density populations, having a competitive strategy and phenotype is advantageous as intrasexual competition is commonplace. Having a large weapon size often indicates greater reproductive success, as competitive males defeat their opponents and then proceed to copulate with the female. In lower densities, having an attractive strategy and phenotype may better attract females, as females often prefer attractive males. There is also less competition against males with enhanced weapons.

=== Female mate choice ===
Females often prefer attractive males that court more under non-competitive mating situations. However, under competitive mating events, females tend to mate with competitive males, or those with larger weapons, although there is no current evidence that either attractive males or competitive males affect the females' longevity or reproductive success.

When females mate with competitive males, the large mandible size phenotype of the males is transferred to the daughter. While the daughter will not inherit large mandibles, the competitive phenotype can masculinize the typical female phenotype, causing a reduction of egg space in their abdomen. This reduces the daughter's overall fitness. Therefore, mating with an attractive male, which often have smaller mandibles, reduces the masculinization of the daughters.

Mating with either attractive or competitive males often results in their sons inheriting the traits of attractive or competitive male, which may increase their fitness indirectly. However, there are no benefits to the daughters.

=== Polyandry ===
Polyandry in female broadhorned flour beetles has been shown to improve their fecundity and overall reproductive success as females that mated multiple times often laid more eggs than those that had only mated once.

== Parental care ==
=== Oviposition ===
The larvae of G. cornutus are approximately 2-6 mg in weight, measured 30-60 days from egg oviposition. 2.5 mg is considered the critical size where larvae that were <2.5 mg in weight often failed metamorphosis and died. Larvae between 2.5-4 mg are considered small individuals with poor nutrition, and those individuals greater than 4 mg were considered large individuals with access to ample nutrition. In high density cultures, pupation of larvae was inhibited whereas isolation immediately induced pupation. Small individuals would take 3-8 days to begin prepupation (visually detectable by a noticeable, unique L shape of the prepupa) whereas large individuals underwent this stage quicker, taking 2-4 days.

=== Sex allocation ===
Females can adjust the sex ratio in their offspring in response to nutritional availability. Since mothers in poor nutritional condition are expected to result in sons with poor reproductive competitive ability, mothers produce smaller sons with smaller mandibles. These males were seen as poor reproductive competitors in relation to males with larger size and mandibles. However, these mothers not only produced smaller children, but they produced a greater quantity of daughters. In contrast, mothers in good nutritional conditional will even out the sex ratio. Under crowded conditions, a similar trend is noticed where females produce larger broods with sex ratios biased towards females, thereby maximizing the number of potential, future colonizers.
