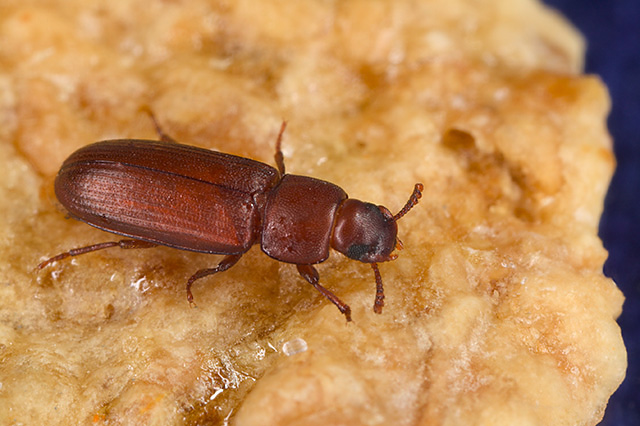

Scientific classification
- Kingdom: Animalia
- Phylum: Arthropoda
- Clade: Pancrustacea
- Class: Insecta
- Order: Coleoptera
- Suborder: Polyphaga
- Infraorder: Cucujiformia
- Family: Tenebrionidae
- Genus: Tribolium
- Species: T. castaneum

Binomial name
- Tribolium castaneum (Herbst, 1797)

Synonyms
- Numerous, see text

= Red flour beetle =

Species of beetle

The red flour beetle (Tribolium castaneum) is a species of beetle in the family Tenebrionidae, the darkling beetles. The red flour beetle, and other closely related beetles like Gnatocerus cornutus, are a worldwide pest of stored products, particularly food grains, and a model organism for ethological and food safety research.

== Description ==
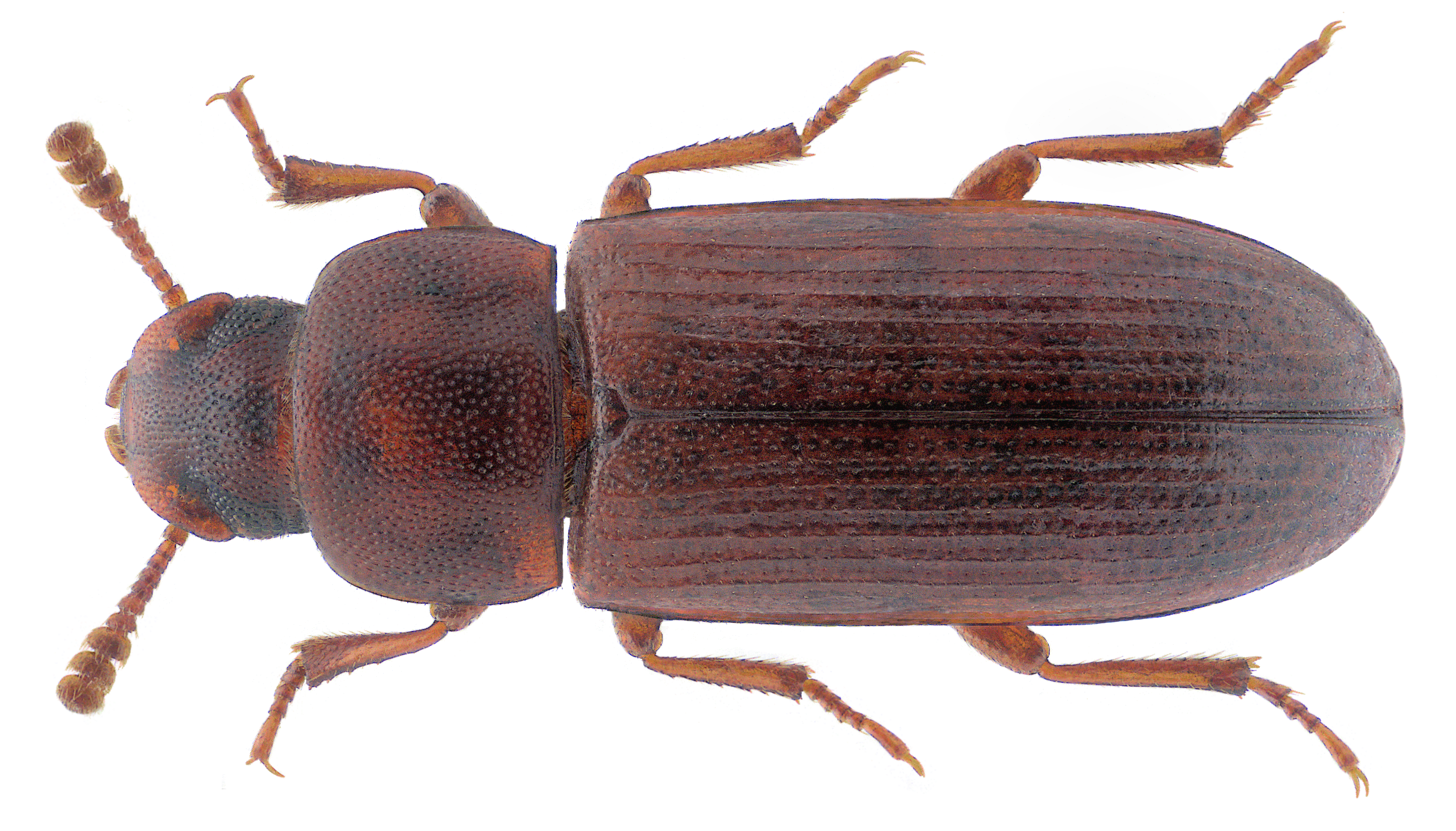
Adult

Adult beetles are small, around 3–4 mm long (1/8 inches), and have a uniform rust, brown or black color. The head and pronotum are sometimes darker than rest of body.

== Ecology ==
The red flour beetle attacks stored grain and other food products including flour, cereals, pasta, biscuits, beans, and nuts, causing loss and damage. The United Nations, in a recent post-harvest compendium, estimated that T. castaneum and T. confusum, the confused flour beetle, are "the two most common secondary pests of all plant commodities in store throughout the world." A research on hermetic storage of wheat and maize flour found that 12 days under hermetic storage resulted in 100% RFB mortality, confirming that hermetic environments are sufficient for controlling insect pests.

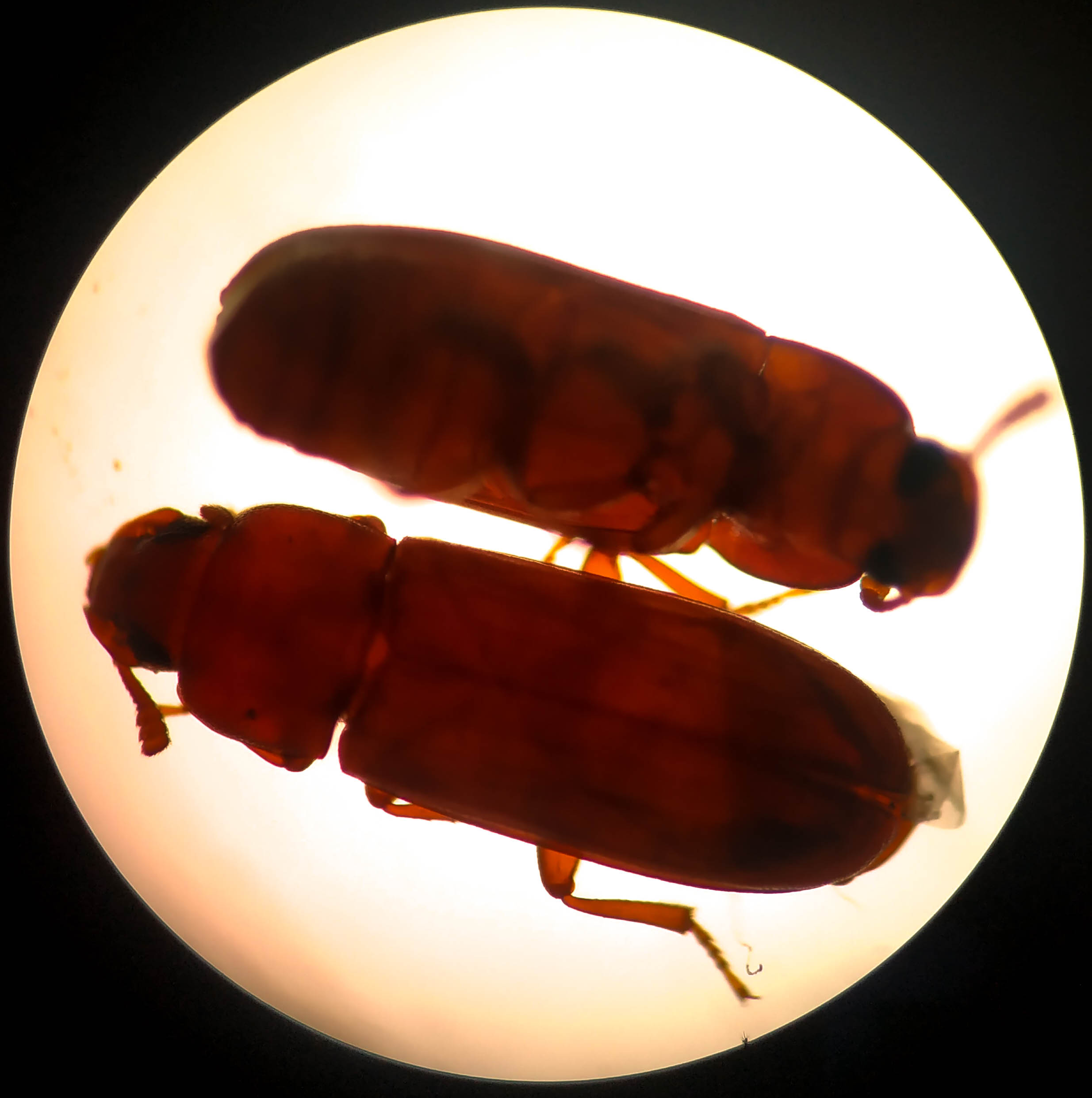
Tribolium castaneum as shown under the microscope

== Distribution and habitat ==
The beetle is of Indo-Australian origin and less able to survive outdoors than the closely related species T. confusum. It has, as a consequence, a more southern distribution, though both species are worldwide in heated environments. The adult is long-lived, sometimes living more than three years. Although previously regarded as a relatively sedentary insect, it has been shown in molecular and ecological research to disperse considerable distances by flight.

== Polyandry ==
Female red flour beetles exhibit polyandrous mating behavior. Within a single copulation period, a female will mate with multiple males. Any one male may have a low sperm count, having depleted its supply through prior matings, so mating with several increases the female's likelihood of obtaining an adequate amount of sperm.

=== Potential advantages ===
Although multiple mating events may also increase the likelihood of finding genetically compatible sperm, genetic compatibility is not always a major factor driving polyandrous behavior. Increased embryo viability due to increased genetic compatibility did not significantly increase the number of adult beetles over time, which indicates that it did not play a significant role in the fitness of the overall population. However, increased genetic compatibility could increase the genetic diversity of a population, which can be advantageous in situations of rapid environmental change.

=== Potential disadvantages ===
==== Male competition ====
The availability of resources and population size can greatly affect how many matings each individual participates in. Increased population size within a given area with fixed resources can limit how many offspring can survive. This can result in heavy competition between males to be a female's last mate, which carries an advantage as ejaculate from one mating can be removed during subsequent matings. When resources are limited, increased cannibalism among competing males can ultimately decrease fitness for the population as a whole, as it decreases both offspring production and survival.

==== Offspring fitness ====
In red flour beetles, a male's ability to attract females (via pheromones) is genetically based. Higher attractiveness does not, however, correlate with higher fitness of offspring. Genes for more attractive pheromones are not a reliable indicator that the male also has genes which will improve offspring survival.

=== Mate choice ===
Females from different populations of red flour beetles are highly polyandrous, while others avoid having multiple mates. This may indicate that the overall advantage or disadvantage likewise varies across environments.

Mate choice strategies vary among female beetles. Moreover, they are capable of cryptic choice – the use of multiple sperm receptacles to store sperm from different males, allowing a later choice of which to use.

Mate choice also varies among male beetles, though they generally prefer mature, virgin females (identified by the absence of any scent from secretions left by previous mates). If a female beetle has only one mate, and his sperm count is sufficient, that male has a very high chance of siring offspring with her. Males with a greater ability to identify preferred mates have an advantage, as do males with more strongly scented secretions that better deter subsequent males.

=== Sexual selection ===
Experimental populations of red flour beetles that had been subjected to strong sexual selection for multiple years became resilient to extinction, and furthermore, when subjected to inbreeding, maintained fitness for up to 20 generations. By contrast, lineages derived from populations that experienced either weak or no sexual selection exhibited rapid fitness decline under inbreeding, and all such populations became extinct within 10 generations. These results indicated that sexual selection reduces mutational load, and by doing so improves population viability.

== Polygamy ==
Polygamy in red flour beetles is a behavior common to both males and females of this species. Polyandry is thus polygamy in the female members of a population as discussed in the section above. On the other hand, polygyny refers to polygamy practiced by males in a population.

=== Polygamy in populations that lack genetic diversity ===
In red flour beetles, females that engage in polygamous behavior produce more offspring than those that are less polygamous. Polygamy is mostly seen in populations that lack genetic diversity. Polygamy in less genetically diverse populations is a means of avoiding fertilization between beetles that are closely related since they may be genetically incompatible. The more partners that a male or female has, the higher the chances that at least one of the matings is with an unrelated partner and the greater the genetic diversity in the offspring. In this way, genetic incompatibility is reduced and diversity is increased in a population. For this reason, females copulate with more males when genetic diversity is low in order to attain fertilization success and also increase fitness in their subsequent offspring.

In some studies, however, it has been noted that fertilization can still occur when related beetles mate. Nonetheless, it is worth noting that there is a significantly lower number of offspring produced when inbred beetles mate than when the matings are between out-bred partners. Successful fertilization observed in a small portion of research in related beetles has led some biologists to claim that there may be no inbreeding depression in red flour beetles. Even though there is successful fertilization, it is observed that a lower number of total offspring is produced, which can be argued to be a type of inbreeding depression since it lowers reproduction fitness.

During mating, red flour beetles are known to engage in polygamous behavior. Male flour beetles have been known to recognize their relatives while the females do not have this capability. Lack of the ability to recognize their relatives has led females to mate with any male within the population. Female red flour beetles are also known to store sperm after mating. More sperm is stored by the first mating, which leads to less sperm stored in subsequent matings. However, amount of stored sperm does not stop the last male mate from fertilizing the egg. This is due to the fact that with each mating, males can remove previously stored sperm thus giving their own sperm an advantage to fertilize the egg.

== Polygyny and fertilization success ==
In red flour beetles, males are known to engage in polygamous behavior. Research largely shows that male red flour beetles engage in polygamous behavior to avoid inbreeding depression, especially when there is competition from other males. There is a higher fertilization success in out-bred males when they compete with inbred males to fertilize the same female.

In polygamous beetles, the male that last fertilizes the female ends up having a higher fertilization success. Polygamy can thus be seen as an evolutionary result as males compete to be the last to fertilize the female's egg and contribute more to the next generation. Last sperm precedence is thus a means of evolutionary competition through which the males try to achieve greater reproductive success.

== As a model organism ==
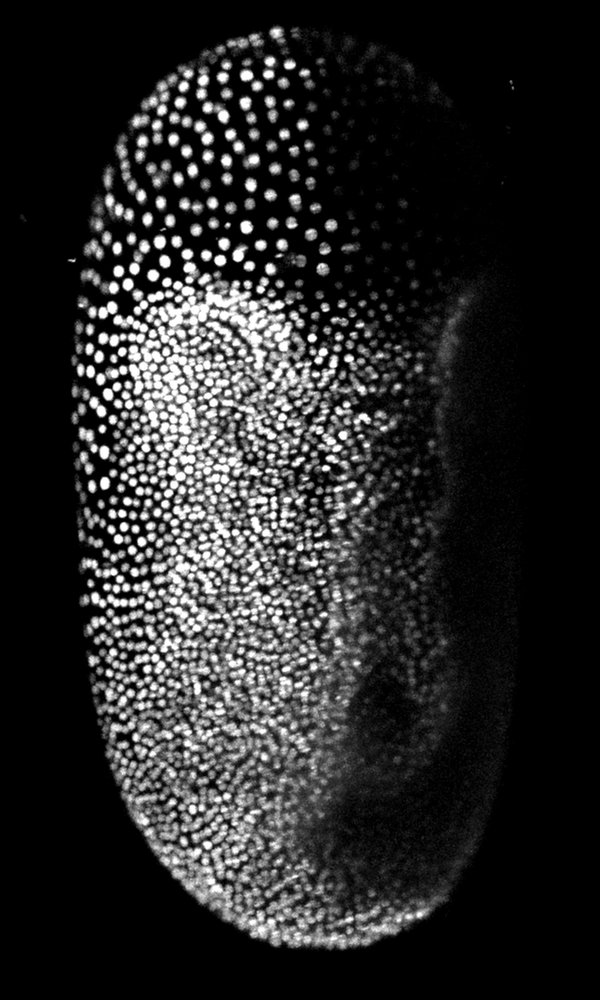
A developing Tribolium castaneum embryo imaged by light-sheet microscopy

The red flour beetle has played an important role as a model organism serving as a model for development and functional genomics. Compared to Drosophila, the red flour beetle more closely represents the development of other insects. In 2008, the genome of T. castaneum was sequenced, analyzed, and compared to other organisms such as Drosophila. The red flour beetle and the fruit fly share about 10,000-15,000 genes. Despite their shared genes, they do have their differences. During development, anterior-posterior patterning is normally regulated by the bicoid gene in Drosophila. However, in the red flour beetle, there is no bicoid orthologue, but instead the genes orthodenticle and hunchback substitute for bicoid in anterior patterning.

Red flour beetles are particularly useful for doing RNAi (RNA interference) experiments. RNAi is RNA that degrades mRNA transcripts to show a knock-down of gene function. Compared to in Drosophila, RNAi has a greater response in the red flour beetle, making it ideal for knock-down experiments.

CRISPR technology has been shown to be useful in studying T. castaneum. In one experiment, researchers used CRISPR to knock out the E-cadherin gene. E-cadherin is a membrane-bound protein of epithelial cells involved in cell-cell adhesion. This resulted in developmental issues in dorsal closure. RNAi knock-down of E-cadherin shows the same effect. This shows that CRISPR technology and gene editing are viable options for studying the red flour beetle as an insect model organism.

== Synonyms ==
Synonyms of Tribolium castaneum (Herbst) are:

- Colydium castaneum Herbst, 1787
- Margus castaneus Dejean, 1833
- Phaleria castanca Gyllenhal, 1810
- Stene ferruginea Westwood, 1839
- Tenebrio castaneus Schönherr, 1806
- Tribolium ferrugineum , Wollaston, 1854
- Tribolium navale (Fabricius, 1775)
- Uloma ferruginea Dejean, 1821

The following names have been cited as synonyms of T. castaneum by some authors but they actually refer to other species:

- Dermestes navalis Fabricius, 1775
- Ips cinnamomea Herbst, 1792
- Ips testacea Fabricius, 1798
- Lyctus navalis (Fabricius, 1775)
- Margus ferrugineus Kuster, 1847
- Stene ferruginea Stephens, 1832
- Tenebrio bifoveolatus Duftschmid, 1812
- Tenebrio ferrugineus Fabricius, 1781
- Tenebrio ochraceous Melsheimer, 1806
- Trogosita ferruginea (Fabricius, 1781)
- Uloma ochracea
- Uloma rubens Dejean, 1836

== See also ==
- Flour beetle
- Home stored product entomology
