= T. domestica =

T. domestica may refer to:

- Tegenaria domestica, the barn funnel weaver spider, lesser house spider or common house spider, a spider species
- Thermobia domestica, the firebrat, a small insect species

== See also ==
- Domestica (disambiguation)
