= C. domesticus =

C. domesticus may refer to:

- Coprinellus domesticus, a mushroom species
- Culex domesticus, a mosquito species in the genus Culex

== See also ==
- Domesticus (disambiguation)
