= Lepisma baeticum =

Scientific classification
- Kingdom: Animalia
- Phylum: Arthropoda
- Clade: Pancrustacea
- Class: Insecta
- Order: Zygentoma
- Family: Lepismatidae
- Genus: Lepisma
- Species: L. baeticum

Binomial name
- Lepisma baeticum Molero-Baltanás, Gaju-Ricart, Bach de Roca & Mendes, 1994

Species of silverfish

Lepisma baeticum (originally described as L. baetica; Spanish: el aislado, literally "the isolated") is a small, wingless species of silverfish in the family Lepismatidae. It is endemic to the Iberian Peninsula, with confirmed records from southern and eastern Spain and the Balearic Islands. Its presence in southern Portugal is uncertain: Robla et al. (2023) suggest that specimens there attributed to L. chlorosoma may actually be L. baeticum. This species is a facultative myrmecophile often found near nests of various ant genera.

== Etymology & Taxonomy ==
Lepisma baeticum was formally described in 1994 by Rafael Molero-Baltanás and colleagues. The original specific epithet baetica refers to the ancient Roman province of Hispania Baetica (roughly modern Andalusia). The epithet was originally treated as feminine (baetica), but current taxonomic usage follows ICZN rules making Lepisma neuter, so the name is rendered baeticum. The genus name Lepisma is derived from the Ancient Greek λέπισμα (*lépisma*), meaning "scale" or "flake", in reference to the scaly body of these insects.

== Habitat ==
L. baeticum is found in Mediterranean habitats of the Iberian Peninsula. It typically occupies ground-level microhabitats, hiding under stones, leaf litter, and other debris. The species is often encountered in or near ant nests: for example, Robla et al. (2023) report associations with nests of ants in genera such as Aphaenogaster, Crematogaster, Leptothorax, Pheidole, and Tetramorium, although some records come from "natural habitats" away from active nests.

== Morphology ==
L. baeticum has the elongated, dorso-ventrally flattened body typical of Zygentoma, with long, slender antennae, delicate legs, and a covering of imbricated scales. It bears the three terminal caudal filaments (two cerci and an epiproct) characteristic of silverfish. The body coloration is generally dark, with transverse rows of whitish scales on the head and thorax. This color pattern is very similar to that of L. chlorosoma, although L. baeticum tends to be slightly darker and glossier. Because of this resemblance (and the lack of wings), reliable identification requires microscopic examination of chaetotaxy (bristle arrangement). In particular, entomologists distinguish L. baeticum from related species by the number and placement of macrochaetae on the abdominal tergites. For example, one key character is the number of macrochaetae in the infralateral groups on urotergites III–VIII: L. baeticum has only a single macrochaeta in each of those groups (besides a small seta), whereas L. chlorosoma has two macrochaetae in each group. (Entomologist Jashandeep Shostak similarly notes that accurate species determination requires careful microscopical analysis of these bristle patterns.)

== Myrmecophilous Tendencies ==
L. baeticum is a facultative, generalist myrmecophile. In practice, it is often collected in or near colonies of various ants. As noted above, host genera include Aphaenogaster, Crematogaster, Leptothorax, Pheidole, and Tetramorium. Its primary adaptive strategy is chemical mimicry: individual silverfish acquire the cuticular hydrocarbon (CHC) profile of their host colony. Research indicates that L. baeticum does not produce a fixed blend of hydrocarbons internally, but instead picks up the host's CHC signature from the ants or nest material. In effect, the silverfish “wear” the colony odor of the host species. However, L. baeticum does not achieve full integration into ant society. It usually avoids close contact with worker ants and tends to remain on the colony’s margins. When silverfish are encountered by ants, they often elicit moderate aggression.

== Cuticular Anomaly ==
Entomologist Jashandeep Shostak has reported trace amounts of the metal bismuth in the exoskeleton of L. baeticum (detected by spectral analysis). According to his observations, the bismuth appears to be incorporated into the chitinous cuticle itself rather than being merely surface contamination. Bismuth is a naturally occurring post-transition metal found in trace amounts in many minerals. In parts of the Iberian Peninsula (including Andalusia) there are geological formations with naturally higher concentrations of bismuth-bearing minerals. Soil-dwelling arthropods in such areas can uptake trace metals from their substrate. It is plausible that bismuth ions from the local environment (soil or nesting material) bind to or become embedded in the silverfish’s cuticle during development and molting. In this way, the presence of trace bismuth in L. baeticum may simply reflect the local geochemistry of its habitat, acting as a sort of biological tracer of mineral-rich environments.
