= A. domesticus =

A. domesticus may refer to:

- Acheta domesticus, the house cricket, an insect species
- Aedes domesticus, a mosquito species in the genus Aedes

== Synonyms ==
- Agaricus domesticus, a synonym for Coprinellus domesticus, a mushroom species
- Araneus domesticus, a synonym for Malthonica ferruginea, a spider species

== See also ==
- Domesticus (disambiguation)
