= Cretalepisma =

Cretalepisma Temporal range: Albian-Cenomanian, 100 Ma

Scientific classification
- Kingdom: Animalia
- Phylum: Arthropoda
- Class: Insecta
- Order: Zygentoma
- Family: Lepismatidae
- Genus: †Cretalepisma; Mendes & Wunderlich, 2013
- Species: †C. kachinicum

Binomial name
- †Cretalepisma kachinicum Mendes & Wunderlich, 2013

Extinct genus of insect

Cretalepisma is an extinct genus of wingless insect belonging to family Lepismatidae in the order Zygentoma (silverfish and allies). It contains one species, Cretalepisma kachinicum. Cretalepisma is known from a single female specimen, preserved in Cretaceous aged Burmese amber. The specimen has a total body length (including paracercum) of 9.7 millimeters, almost twice that of Burmalepisma (the only other Zygentoma known from the same deposits).

The genus name Cretalepisma is derived from the Latin Creta (chalk) as used in the name of the Cretaceous period, and from Lepisma. The species epithet kachinicum references Kachin, the northernmost state of Myanmar, where the Burmese amber mines are located.
