= Neoasterolepisma myrmecobium =

Scientific classification
- Domain: Eukaryota
- Kingdom: Animalia
- Phylum: Arthropoda
- Class: Insecta
- Order: Zygentoma
- Family: Lepismatidae
- Genus: Neoasterolepisma
- Species: N. myrmecobium

Binomial name
- Neoasterolepisma myrmecobium (Silvestri, 1908)

Species of silverfish

Neoasterolepisma myrmecobium is a species of silverfish in the family Lepismatidae. It is found in Europe.
