= Neoasterolepisma balearicum =

Scientific classification
- Domain: Eukaryota
- Kingdom: Animalia
- Phylum: Arthropoda
- Class: Insecta
- Order: Zygentoma
- Family: Lepismatidae
- Genus: Neoasterolepisma
- Species: N. balearicum

Binomial name
- Neoasterolepisma balearicum Molero, Bach & Gaju, 1997

Species of silverfish

Neoasterolepisma balearicum is a species of silverfish in the family Lepismatidae.
