= C. domestica =

C. domestica may refer to:

- Cryphia domestica, the marbled beauty, a moth species abundant throughout most of Europe
- Curcuma domestica, the turmeric, a plant species

== Synonyms ==
- Cordia domestica, a synonym for Cordia myxa, the Assyrian plum, a tree species

== See also ==
- Domestica (disambiguation)
