= Neoasterolepisma caecum =

Scientific classification
- Domain: Eukaryota
- Kingdom: Animalia
- Phylum: Arthropoda
- Class: Insecta
- Order: Zygentoma
- Family: Lepismatidae
- Genus: Neoasterolepisma
- Species: N. caecum

Binomial name
- Neoasterolepisma caecum Molero, Bach & Gaju, 1999

Species of silverfish

Neoasterolepisma caecum is a species of silverfish in the family Lepismatidae.
