= S. domesticus =

S. domesticus may refer to:

- Scotophaeus domesticus, Tikader, 1962, a spider species in the genus Scotophaeus found in India and China
- Sus domesticus, the domestic pig, a mammal species

== See also ==
- Domesticus (disambiguation)
