= Neoasterolepisma crassipes =

Scientific classification
- Domain: Eukaryota
- Kingdom: Animalia
- Phylum: Arthropoda
- Class: Insecta
- Order: Zygentoma
- Family: Lepismatidae
- Genus: Neoasterolepisma
- Species: N. crassipes

Binomial name
- Neoasterolepisma crassipes (Escherich, 1905)

Species of silverfish

Neoasterolepisma crassipes is a species of silverfish in the family Lepismatidae.
