= Domesticus =

The word Domesticus (Latin for belonging to the house), is found in the binomial or trinomial names of many species or subspecies of animals commonly found in or around the home. It can also be found in latin words/phrases that do not refer to animals. Examples of this include:

- Domesticus (Roman Empire), a member of the Domestici, an elite guard unit of the late Roman Empire
- Agroecius Domesticus, a man of uncertain date who died at the age of 33, and was buried in Vienne
- Secretarius Domesticus, a title in the Secretariat of State of the Holy See
- Silvanus domesticus, a mark of a field in Roman mythology

== Species ==
=== Bacteria ===
- Olivibacter domesticus

=== Fungi ===
- Coprinellus domesticus, the firerug inkcap.

=== Plantae ===
- Malus domestica, the common apple

=== Animalia ===
- Aedes domesticus, a mosquito species in the genus Aedes
- Acheta domesticus, the house cricket
- Anas platyrhynchos domesticus, the domestic duck
- Anser anser domesticus, the common domestic goose
- Anser cygnoides domesticus, the chinese goose
- Bos domesticus, the Bali cattle
- Canis domesticus, the domestic dog
- Cryptotermes domesticus, the domestic drywood termite
- Culex domesticus, a mosquito species in the genus Culex
- Dolichopus domesticus, a species of long-legged fly
- Equus caballus domesticus, the domestic horse
- Gallus domesticus, the chicken
- Lycalopex culpaeus domesticus, the Fuegian dog
- Meleagris gallopavo domesticus, the domestic turkey
- Mus musculus domesticus, the house mouse
- Oryctolagus cuniculus domesticus, the domestic rabbit
- Passer domesticus, the house sparrow
- Phytoseius domesticus, Rather, 1985, a mite species in the genus Phytoseius and the family Phytoseiidae
- Prodidomus domesticus, Lessert, 1938, a spider species in the genus Prodidomus and the family Prodidomidae found in Congo
- Rattus rattus domesticus, a subspecies of rat
- Sclerodermus domesticus, the hard-skinned cuckoo wasp
- Sus domesticus, the domestic pig
- Tydeus domesticus, a mite
- Domesticus, the taxonomic term

== See also ==
- Including use as a personal or species name
- Domestica (disambiguation)
- Domesticum (disambiguation)
- Domestication
- Domestikos, a senior military officials of the Byzantine Empire
