= Neoasterolepisma foreli =

Scientific classification
- Domain: Eukaryota
- Kingdom: Animalia
- Phylum: Arthropoda
- Class: Insecta
- Order: Zygentoma
- Family: Lepismatidae
- Genus: Neoasterolepisma
- Species: N. foreli

Binomial name
- Neoasterolepisma foreli (Moniez, 1894)

Species of silverfish

Neoasterolepisma foreli is a species of silverfish in the family Lepismatidae.
