= Neoasterolepisma vulcana =

Scientific classification
- Domain: Eukaryota
- Kingdom: Animalia
- Phylum: Arthropoda
- Class: Insecta
- Order: Zygentoma
- Family: Lepismatidae
- Genus: Neoasterolepisma
- Species: N. vulcana

Binomial name
- Neoasterolepisma vulcana Mendes, Bach & Gaju, 1993

Species of silverfish

Neoasterolepisma vulcana is a species of silverfish in the family Lepismatidae.
