= Sceletolepisma albidum =

Scientific classification
- Domain: Eukaryota
- Kingdom: Animalia
- Phylum: Arthropoda
- Class: Insecta
- Order: Zygentoma
- Family: Lepismatidae
- Genus: Sceletolepisma
- Species: S. albidum

Binomial name
- Sceletolepisma albidum (Escherich, 1905)

Synonyms
- Ctenolepisma albida Escherich, 1905

Species of silverfish

Sceletolepisma albidum is a species of silverfish in the family Lepismatidae.
