= Tricholepisma indalicum =

Scientific classification
- Domain: Eukaryota
- Kingdom: Animalia
- Phylum: Arthropoda
- Class: Insecta
- Order: Zygentoma
- Family: Lepismatidae
- Genus: Tricholepisma
- Species: T. indalicum

Binomial name
- Tricholepisma indalicum Molero, Bach & Gaju, 1995

Species of silverfish

Tricholepisma indalicum is a species of silverfish in the family Lepismatidae.
