= Sceletolepisma canariense =

Scientific classification
- Domain: Eukaryota
- Kingdom: Animalia
- Phylum: Arthropoda
- Class: Insecta
- Order: Zygentoma
- Family: Lepismatidae
- Genus: Sceletolepisma
- Species: S. canariense

Binomial name
- Sceletolepisma canariense Mendes, Molero, Bach & Gaju, 1993

Synonyms
- Ctenolepisma canariensis Mendes, Molero, Bach & Gaju, 1993

Species of silverfish

Sceletolepisma canariense is a species of silverfish in the family Lepismatidae.
