= Neoasterolepisma pelagodromae =

Scientific classification
- Domain: Eukaryota
- Kingdom: Animalia
- Phylum: Arthropoda
- Class: Insecta
- Order: Zygentoma
- Family: Lepismatidae
- Genus: Neoasterolepisma
- Species: N. pelagodromae

Binomial name
- Neoasterolepisma pelagodromae Mendes, 1988

Species of silverfish

Neoasterolepisma pelagodromae is a species of silverfish in the family Lepismatidae. It is found in Europe.
