= Neoasterolepisma hespericum =

Scientific classification
- Domain: Eukaryota
- Kingdom: Animalia
- Phylum: Arthropoda
- Class: Insecta
- Order: Zygentoma
- Family: Lepismatidae
- Genus: Neoasterolepisma
- Species: N. hespericum

Binomial name
- Neoasterolepisma hespericum Molero, Bach & Gaju, 1996

Species of silverfish

Neoasterolepisma hespericum is a species of silverfish in the family Lepismatidae.
