= Neoasterolepisma gauthieri =

Scientific classification
- Domain: Eukaryota
- Kingdom: Animalia
- Phylum: Arthropoda
- Class: Insecta
- Order: Zygentoma
- Family: Lepismatidae
- Genus: Neoasterolepisma
- Species: N. gauthieri

Binomial name
- Neoasterolepisma gauthieri (Wygodzinsky, 1941)

Species of silverfish

Neoasterolepisma gauthieri is a species of silverfish in the family Lepismatidae.

== Subspecies ==
These two subspecies belong to the species Neoasterolepisma gauthieri:

- Neoasterolepisma gauthieri calvum Molero, Mendes, Gaju & Bach, 1994
- Neoasterolepisma gauthieri gauthieri
