= Neoasterolepisma balcanicum =

Scientific classification
- Domain: Eukaryota
- Kingdom: Animalia
- Phylum: Arthropoda
- Class: Insecta
- Order: Zygentoma
- Family: Lepismatidae
- Genus: Neoasterolepisma
- Species: N. balcanicum

Binomial name
- Neoasterolepisma balcanicum (Stach, 1922)

Species of silverfish

Neoasterolepisma balcanicum is a species of silverfish in the family Lepismatidae.
