= Allacrotelsa kraepelini =

Scientific classification
- Kingdom: Animalia
- Phylum: Arthropoda
- Class: Insecta
- Order: Zygentoma
- Family: Lepismatidae
- Genus: Allacrotelsa
- Species: A. kraepelini

Binomial name
- Allacrotelsa kraepelini (Escherich, 1905)

Species of silverfish

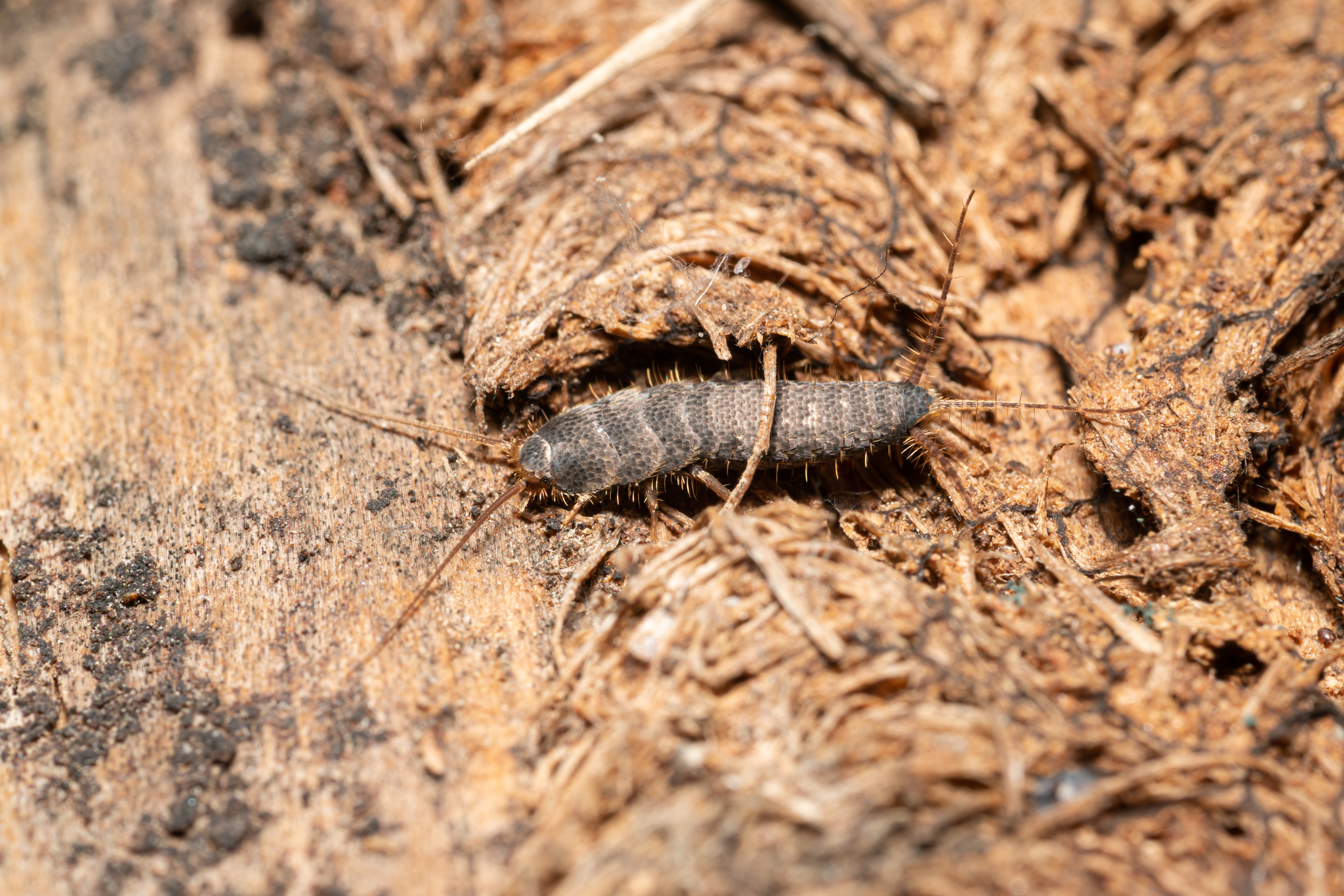
Allacrotelsa kraepelini

Allacrotelsa kraepelini is a species of silverfish in the family Lepismatidae.
