= Sex ratio =

Ratio of males to females in a population

Sex ratio at birth for human over time

Sex ratio at five years old

Sex ratio at sixty years old

A sex ratio is the ratio of males to females in a population. As explained by Fisher's principle, for evolutionary reasons this is usually about equal in species which reproduce sexually. However, many species deviate from an even sex ratio, either periodically or permanently. These include parthenogenetic and androgenetic species, cyclical parthenogens such as aphids, and some eusocial wasps, bees, ants, and termites.

== Types ==
In most species, the sex ratio varies according to the age profile of the population.

It is generally divided into four subdivisions:

- primary sex ratio — ratio at fertilization
- secondary sex ratio — ratio at birth
- tertiary sex ratio — ratio in sexually mature organisms
  - The tertiary sex ratio is equivalent to the adult sex ratio (ASR), which is defined as the ratio of adult males to females in a population.
  - The operational sex ratio (OSR) is the ratio of sexually active males to females in a population, and is therefore derived from a subset of the individuals included when calculating the ASR. Although conceptually distinct, researchers have sometimes equated the ASR with the OSR, particularly in experimental studies of animals where the difference between the two values may not always be readily apparent.
- quaternary sex ratio — ratio in post-reproductive organisms

These definitions can be somewhat subjective since they lack clear boundaries.

== Sex ratio theory ==
Sex ratio theory is a field of academic study which seeks to understand the sex ratios observed in nature from an evolutionary perspective. It continues to be heavily influenced by the work of Eric Charnov. He defines five major questions, both for his book and the field in general (slightly abbreviated here):

1. For a dioecious species, what is the equilibrium sex ratio maintained by natural selection?
2. For a sequential hermaphrodite, what is the equilibrium sex order and time of sex change?
3. For a simultaneous hermaphrodite, what is the equilibrium allocation of resources to male versus female function in each breeding season?
4. Under what conditions are the various states of hermaphroditism or dioecy evolutionarily stable? When is a mixture of sexual types stable?
5. When does selection favour the ability of an individual to alter its allocation to male versus female function, in response to particular environmental or life history situations?

Biological research mostly concerns itself with sex allocation rather than sex ratio, sex allocation denoting the allocation of energy to either sex. Common research themes are the effects of local mate and resource competition (often abbreviated LMC and LRC, respectively).

== Fisher's principle ==
Fisher's principle (1930) explains why in most species, the sex ratio is approximately 1:1. His argument was summarised by W. D. Hamilton (1967) as follows, assuming that parents invest the same whether raising male or female offspring:

1. Suppose male births are less common than female.
2. A newborn male then has better mating prospects than a newborn female, and therefore can expect to have more offspring.
3. Therefore parents genetically disposed to produce males tend to have more than average numbers of grandchildren born to them.
4. Therefore the genes for male-producing tendencies spread, and male births become more common.
5. As the 1:1 sex ratio is approached, the advantage associated with producing males dies away.
6. The same reasoning holds if females are substituted for males throughout. Therefore 1:1 is the equilibrium ratio.

This means that the 1:1 ratio is the evolutionarily stable strategy. This ratio has been observed in many species, including the bee Macrotera portalis. A study performed by Danforth observed no significant difference in the number of males and females from the 1:1 sex ratio.

== Human sex ratio ==
Map indicating the human sex ratio by country. Countries with more males than females. Countries with the same number of males and females (accounting that the ratio has 3 significant figures, i.e., 1.00 males to 1.00 females). Countries with more females than males. No data

The human sex ratio is of particular interest to anthropologists and demographers. In human societies, sex ratios at birth may be considerably skewed by factors such as the age of mother at birth and by sex-selective abortion and infanticide. Some families also stop having children after they have both boys and girls. Exposure to pesticides and other environmental contaminants may be a significant contributing factor as well. As of 2024, the global sex ratio at birth is estimated at 105 boys to 100 girls. The sex ratio is reversed for people 65 and older, where there are 81 men for every 100 women. Across all ages, the global population is nearly balanced, with 101 males for every 100 females.

A 2020 study of the Swedish population based upon birth records of all people born after 1932 concluded that there was no statistically significant correlations between an individuals' offspring's sex and their siblings' offspring's sex, from this the researchers conclude that the sex-ratio is not an inheritable trait in humans, and therefore call into question the applicability of Fisher's principle to our species. Although the statistical results of this study have not been disputed, their interpretation has, with multiple comments arguing that this data does not invalidate Fisher's principle for humans. Indeed, further work sought to disprove this, as a later study of British genetic data claimed to have shown that Fisher's principle could apply despite the inheritability of sex-ratio being undetectable, largely because of the small size of human families and the relatively low statistical power that measurements made on these small families would yield. However, later statistical reanalysis of this same British data largely weakened these conclusions.

A large 2025 epidemiological study of American nurses found the chances of a specific couple giving birth to a boy or girl are not always 50-50, and the overall pattern follows a beta-binomial distribution. The number of families with three or more children that have all boys or all girls is higher than would be expected by random chance. Families with three girls had a 58% chance of having a fourth, and families with three boys had a 61% chance of having a fourth. Women 29 or older at first birth had a 13% higher chance of having only boys or only girls.

Factors which may affect birth sex unconfirmed by large studies include vaginal pH, length of the follicular phase of the menstrual cycle, the menstrual cycle phase at conception, and genetic factors. Other unconfirmed correlations with inherited traits include attractiveness, wealth, aggression, and body size. A 2025 study of over 58,000 American women suggested a correlation with two single-nucleotide mutations in the mother — NSUN6 increasing the likelihood of only female children and TSHZ1 increasing the likelihood of only male children.

== Examples in non-human species ==
=== Environmental and individual control ===
Spending equal amounts of resources to produce offspring of either sex is an evolutionarily stable strategy: if the general population deviates from this equilibrium by favoring one sex, one can obtain higher reproductive success with less effort by producing more of the other. For species where the cost of successfully raising one offspring is roughly the same regardless of its sex, this translates to an approximately equal sex ratio.

Bacteria of the genus Wolbachia cause skewed sex ratios in some arthropod species as they kill males. Sex-ratio of adult populations of pelagic copepods is usually skewed towards dominance of females. However, there are differences in adult sex ratios between families: in families in which females require multiple matings to keep producing eggs, sex ratios are less biased (close to 1); in families in which females can produce eggs continuously after only one mating, sex ratios are strongly skewed towards females.

Several species of reptiles have temperature-dependent sex determination, where incubation temperature of eggs determines the sex of the individual. In the American alligator, for example, females are hatched from eggs incubated between 27.7 to 30 °C (81.9 to 86.0 °F), whereas males are hatched from eggs 32.2 to 33.8 °C (90.0 to 92.8 °F). In this method, however, all eggs in a clutch (20–50) will be of the same sex. In fact, the natural sex ratio of this species is five females to one male.

In birds, mothers can influence the sex of their chicks. In peafowl, maternal body condition can influence the proportion of daughters in the range from 25% to 87%.

Dichogamy (sequential hermaphroditism) is normal in several groups of fish, such as wrasses, parrotfish and clownfish. This can cause a discrepancy in the sex ratios as well. In the bluestreak cleaner wrasse, there is only one male for every group of 6-8 females. If the male fish dies, the strongest female changes its sex to become the male for the group. All of these wrasses are born female, and only become male in this situation. Other species, like clownfish, do this in reverse, where all start out as non-reproductive males, and the largest male becomes a female, with the second-largest male maturing to become reproductive.

=== Domesticated animals ===
Traditionally, farmers have discovered that the most economically efficient community of animals will have a large number of females and a very small number of males. A herd of cows with a few bulls or a flock of hens with one rooster are the most economical sex ratios for domesticated livestock.

=== Dioecious plants secondary sex ratio and amount of pollen ===
It was found that the amount of fertilizing pollen can influence secondary sex ratio in dioecious plants. Increase in pollen amount leads to decrease in number of male plants in the progeny. This relationship was confirmed on four plant species from three families – Rumex acetosa (Polygonaceae), Silene alba (Caryophyllaceae), Cannabis sativa and Humulus japonicus (Cannabinaceae).

=== Polyandrous and cooperatively breeding homeotherms ===
In charadriiform birds, recent research has shown clearly that polyandry and sex-role reversal (where males care and females compete for mates) as found in phalaropes, jacanas, painted snipe and a few plover species is clearly related to a strongly male-biased adult sex ratio. Those species with male care and polyandry invariably have adult sex ratios with a large surplus of males, which in some cases can reach as high as six males per female.

Male-biased adult sex ratios have also been shown to correlate with cooperative breeding in mammals such as alpine marmots and wild canids. This correlation may also apply to cooperatively breeding birds, though the evidence is less clear. It is known, however, that both male-biased adult sex ratios and cooperative breeding tend to evolve where caring for offspring is extremely difficult due to low secondary productivity, as in Australia and Southern Africa. It is also known that in cooperative breeders where both sexes are philopatric like the varied sittella, adult sex ratios are equally or more male-biased than in those cooperative species, such as fairy-wrens, treecreepers and the noisy miner where females always disperse.

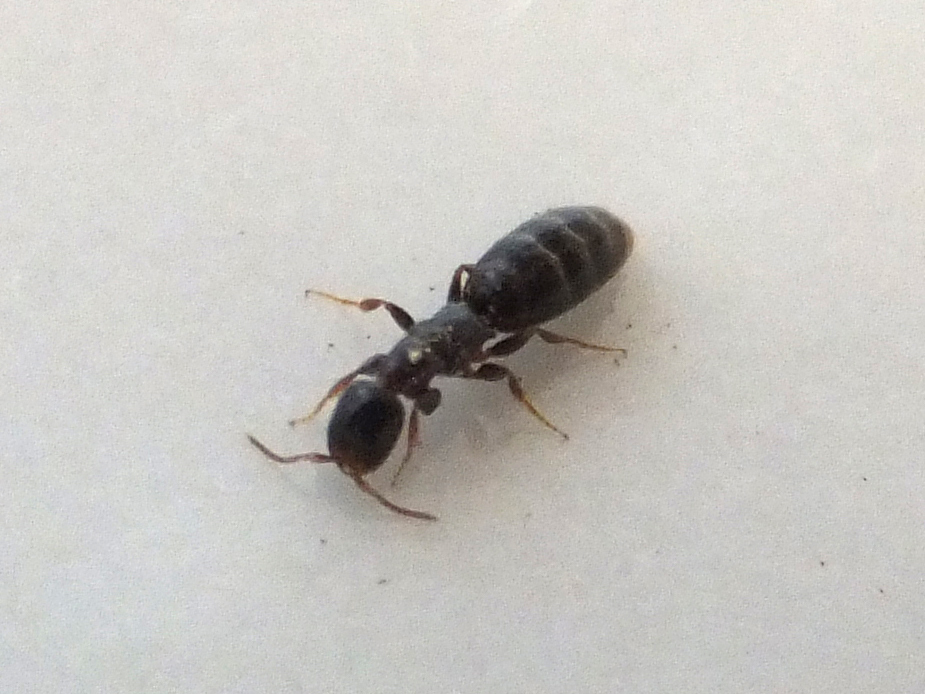
Adult female of the parasitoid wasp Sclerodermus. This genus is known for producing extremely female-biased sex ratios in communal broods, a pattern shaped by social dominance and infanticide.

=== Extreme female-biased ratios in parasitoid wasps ===
Some parasitoid wasps, particularly those in the genus Sclerodermus, exhibit extremely female-biased sex ratios, often with fewer than 10% of offspring being male. This is unusual because classical local mate competition theory predicts that as more females contribute offspring within a group, the sex ratio should become more balanced, since males are no longer only competing with their brothers for mates.

Recent research has shown that social interactions among egg-laying females can explain this discrepancy. Mathematical models suggest that dominant females may kill the sons of subordinates or prevent them from producing sons altogether. These behaviors, forms of infanticide and reproductive dominance, can lead to highly skewed sex ratios at both the individual and group level, even when all females cooperate in raising the brood.

== See also ==
- Evolution of sex
- Operational sex ratio
- Sex allocation
- Trivers–Willard hypothesis
- XY sex-determination system

Humans:

- List of countries by sex ratio
- Bride kidnapping
- Groom kidnapping
- Demographic transition
- Sex selection
- Sex-selective abortion and infanticide
- Youth bulge
