= Male intrasexual competition =

Competition between males to mate with a female

In ethology, male intrasexual competition occurs when two males of the same species compete for the opportunity to mate with a female. Sexually dimorphic traits, size, sex ratio, and the social situation may all play a role in the effects male-male competition has on the reproductive success of a male and the mate choice of a female. Larger males tend to win male-male conflicts due to their sheer strength and ability to ward off other males from taking over their females. For instance, in the fly Dryomyza anilis, size shows the strongest correlation to the outcome of male-male conflicts over resources like territory and females.

== Influencing factors ==
=== Sex ratio ===
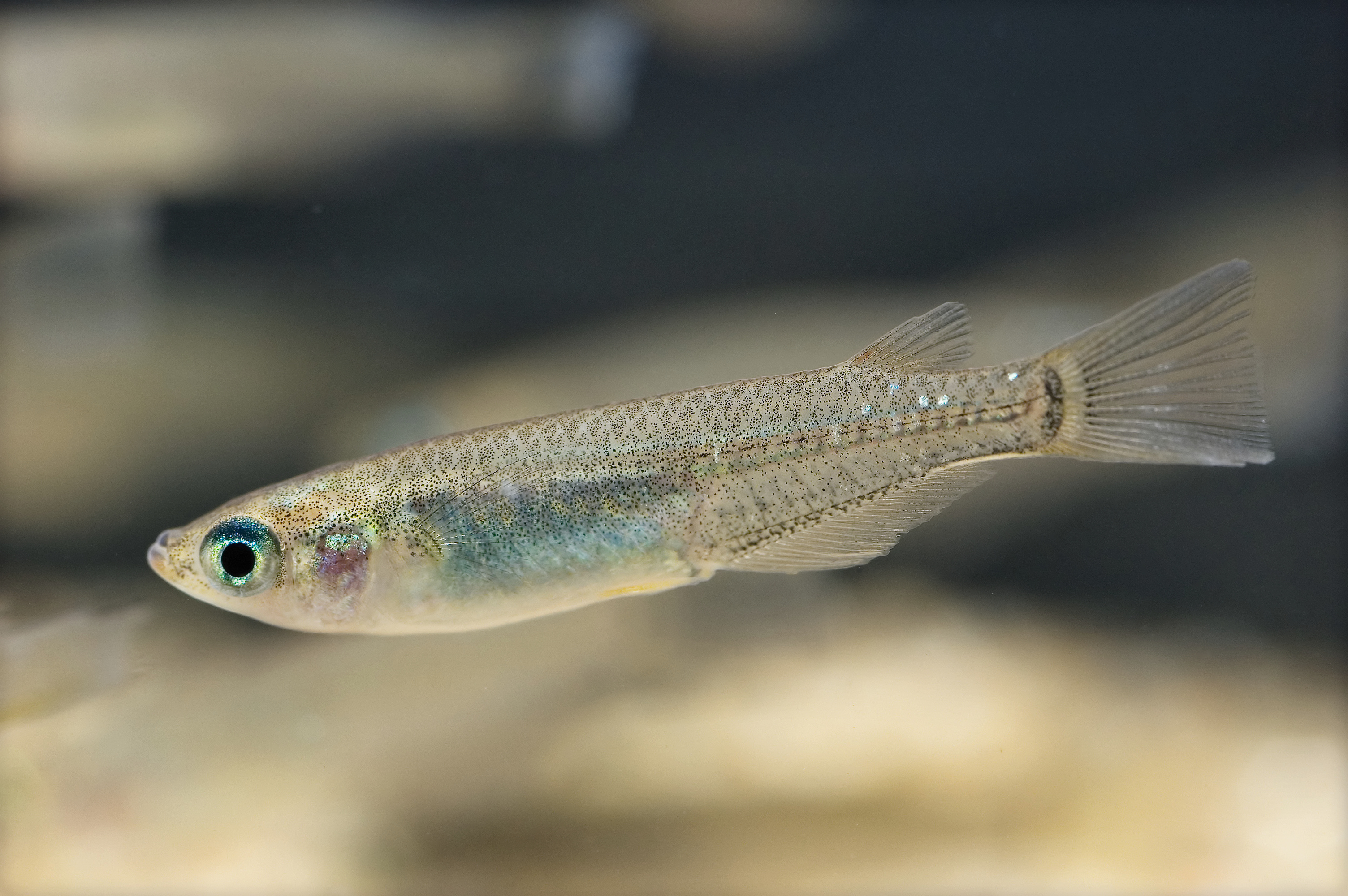
Japanese medaka, Oryzias latipes

Multiple types of male-male competition may occur in a population at different times depending on the conditions. Competition variation occurs based on the frequency of various mating behaviours present in the population. One factor that can influence the type of competition observed is the population density of males. When there is a high density of males present in the population, competition tends to be less aggressive and therefore sneak tactics and disruptions techniques are more often employed. These techniques often indicate a type of competition referred to as scramble competition. In Japanese medaka, Oryzias latipes, sneaking behaviours refer to when a male interrupts a mating pair during copulation by grasping on to either the male or the female and releasing their own sperm in the hopes of being the one to fertilize the female. Disruption is a technique which involves one male bumping the male that is copulating with the female away just before his sperm is released and the eggs are fertilized.

However, all techniques are not equally successful when in competition for reproductive success. Disruption results in a shorter copulation period and can therefore disrupt the fertilization of the eggs by the sperm, which frequently results in lower rates of fertilization and smaller clutch size.

==== Reproductive dominance and infanticide under local mate competition ====
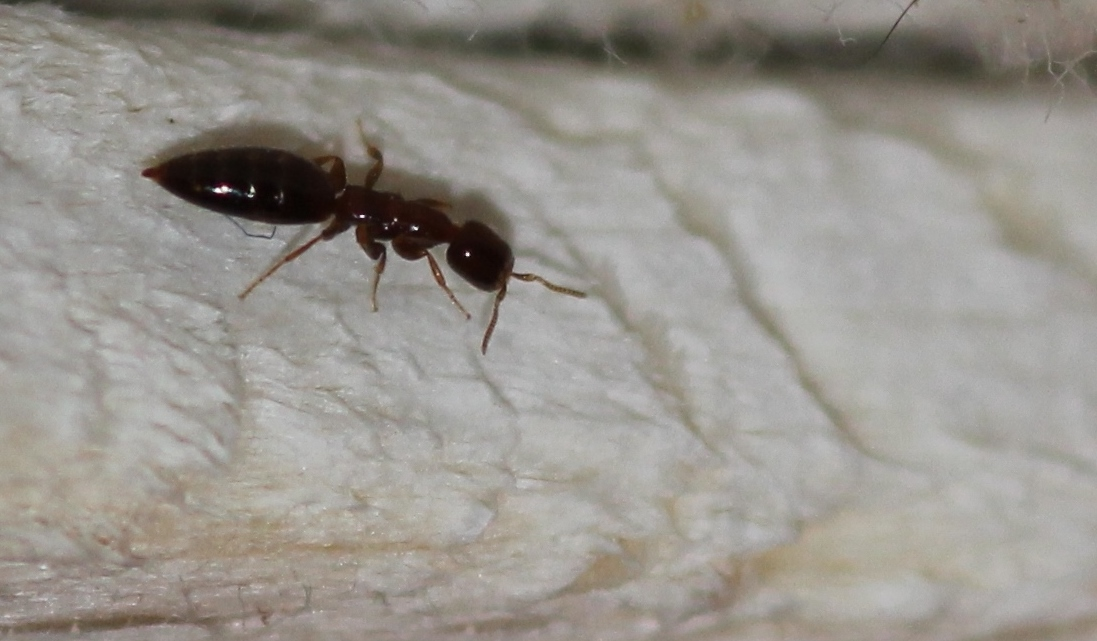
A female Sclerodermus wasp. In this genus, dominant females may kill or suppress the male offspring of subordinate females, a form of reproductive competition that results in extremely female-biased sex ratios despite shared parental care.

In some species, particularly parasitoid wasps like those in the genus Sclerodermus, females lay eggs communally and their offspring mate locally, creating strong local mate competition (LMC). Under classical LMC theory, the sex ratio is expected to become less biased as more females (foundress) contribute offspring, since their sons compete with a wider pool of males, not just their brothers.

However, empirical studies have found persistently extreme female-biased sex ratios in Sclerodermus, even in large multi-foundress groups. Recent models propose that dominant foundresses suppress male production by subordinates, either by infanticide or by social dominance that prevents them from producing sons at all. This behavior skews the offspring sex ratio and alters the evolutionarily stable strategy predicted by classical models.

=== Resource value and social ranking ===
Another factor that can influence male-male competition is the value of the resource to competitors. Male-male competition can pose many risks to a male's fitness, such as high energy expenditure, physical injury, lower sperm quality and lost paternity. The risk of competition must therefore be worth the value of the resource. A male is more likely to engage in competition for a resource that improves their reproductive success if the resource value is higher. While male-male competition can occur in the presence or absence of a female, competition occurs more frequently in the presence of a female. The presence of a female directly increases the resource value of a territory or shelter and so the males are more likely to accept the risk of competition when a female is present. The smaller males of a species are also more likely to engage in competition with larger males in the presence of a female. Due to the higher level of risk for subordinate males, they tend to engage in competition less frequently than larger, more dominant males and therefore breed less frequently than dominant males. This is seen in many species, such as the Omei treefrog, Rhacophorus omeimontis, where larger males obtain more mating opportunities and mate with larger females.

=== Winner–loser effects ===
A third factor that can impact the success of a male in competition is winner-loser effects. Burrowing crickets, Velarifictorus aspersus, compete for burrows to attract females using their large mandibles for fighting. Female burrowing crickets are more likely to choose winner of a competition in the 2 hours after the fight. The presence of a winning male suppresses mating behaviours of the losing males because the winning male tends to produce more frequent and enhanced mating calls in this period of time.

== Effect on female fitness ==
Male-male competition can both positively and negatively affect female fitness. When there is a high density of males in a population and a large number of males attempting to mate with the female, she is more likely to resist mating attempts, resulting in lower fertilization rates. High levels of male-male competition can also result in a reduction in female investment in mating. Many forms of competition can also cause significant distress for the female negatively impacting her ability to reproduce. An increase in male-male competition can affect a female's ability to select the best mates, and therefore decrease the likelihood of successful reproduction.

However, group mating in Japanese medaka increases the fitness of females due to an increase in genetic variation, a higher likelihood of paternal care, and a higher likelihood of successful fertilization. Exposure to environmental estrogens, such as some herbicides, can confuse female choice of males.

== See also ==
- Female intrasexual competition
