= Tricholepisma gyriniforme =

Scientific classification
- Kingdom: Animalia
- Phylum: Arthropoda
- Class: Insecta
- Order: Zygentoma
- Family: Lepismatidae
- Genus: Tricholepisma
- Species: T. gyriniforme

Binomial name
- Tricholepisma gyriniforme (Lucas, 1846)

Species of silverfish

Tricholepisma gyriniforme is a species of silverfish in the family Lepismatidae.
