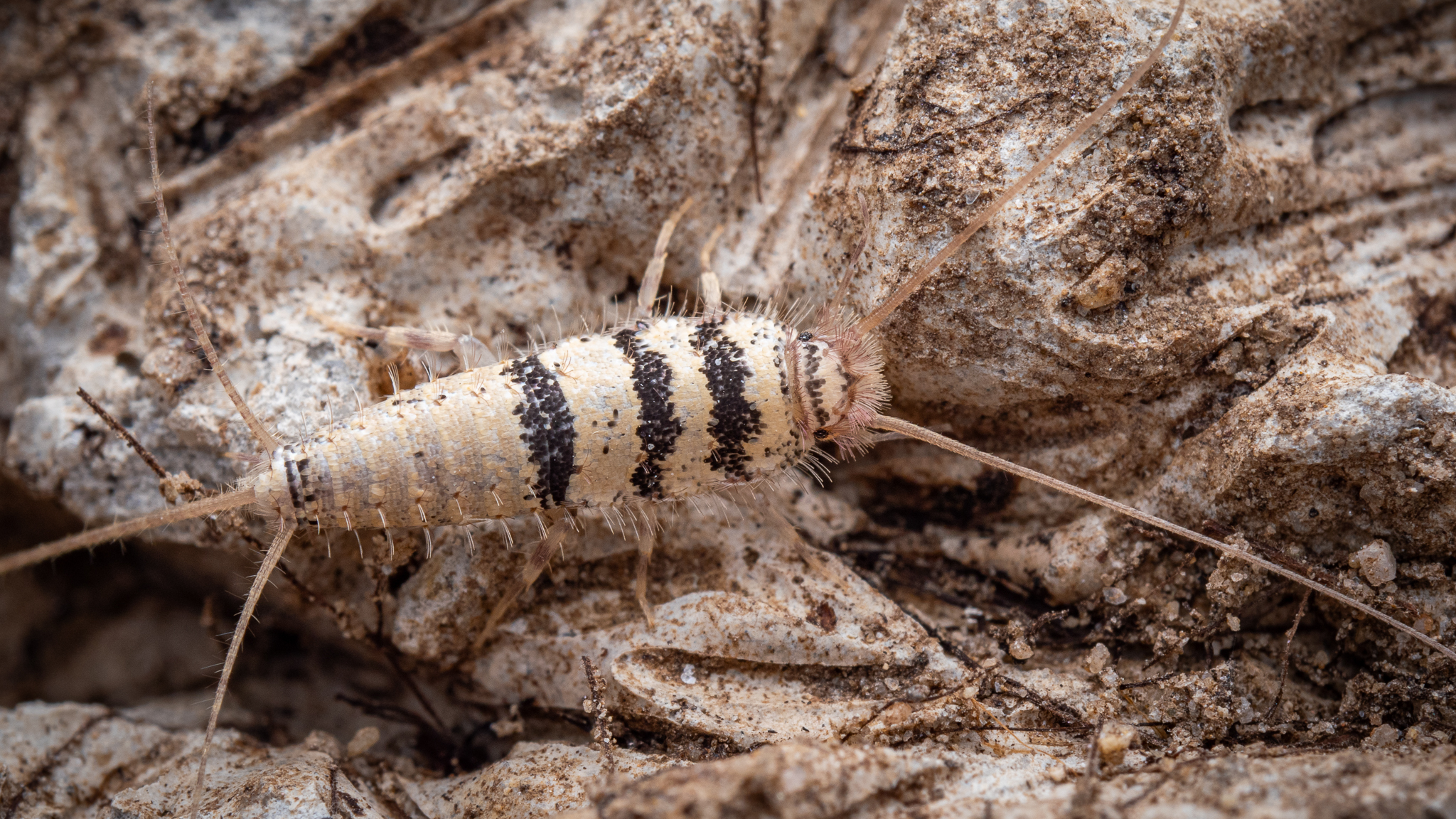

Scientific classification
- Kingdom: Animalia
- Phylum: Arthropoda
- Clade: Pancrustacea
- Class: Insecta
- Order: Zygentoma
- Family: Lepismatidae
- Genus: Thermobia
- Species: T. aegyptiaca

Binomial name
- Thermobia aegyptiaca (H. Lucas, 1840)

Synonyms
- Lepisma pilifera H. Lucas, 1840; Ctenolepisma campbelli Barnhart, 1951; Thermobia cincta Wahlgren, 1906; Thermobia longimana Escherich, 1905

= Thermobia aegyptiaca =

Species of silverfish

Thermobia aegyptiaca is a species of silverfish in the family Lepismatidae. The species was described by Hippolyte Lucas in 1840 based on specimens collected in Egypt. Thermobia aegyptiaca is distributed in Africa and the eastern Mediterranean Basin.

The species has been found to be associated with the termite species Psammotermes hybostoma.

As the type specimens were not available for later study, a neotype originating from Helwan was designated.
