= Neoasterolepisma inexpectatum =

Scientific classification
- Domain: Eukaryota
- Kingdom: Animalia
- Phylum: Arthropoda
- Class: Insecta
- Order: Zygentoma
- Family: Lepismatidae
- Genus: Neoasterolepisma
- Species: N. inexpectatum

Binomial name
- Neoasterolepisma inexpectatum Mendes, Molero, Bach & Gaju, 1993

Species of silverfish

Neoasterolepisma inexpectatum is a species of silverfish in the family Lepismatidae.
