= Sceletolepisma =

Scientific classification
- Kingdom: Animalia
- Phylum: Arthropoda
- Class: Insecta
- Order: Zygentoma
- Family: Lepismatidae
- Genus: Sceletolepisma; Wygodzinsky, 1955

Species
- ~40; see text

Synonyms
- Apolepisma Kaplan, 1993; Irishisma Kaplan, 1993; Silvestrellisma Kaplan, 1993; Wygodzinskisma Kaplan, 1993

Genus of silverfishes

Sceletolepisma is a genus of primitive insects in the order Zygentoma that is closely related to the silverfish and firebrat but less reliant on human habitation, some species being found both indoors and outdoors and some found exclusively outdoors. The genus is distributed nearly worldwide in warm regions.

== Nomenclature ==
Many members of the genus Sceletolepisma have been previously included in other genera, such as Ctenolepisma. Most authors have historically treated the nomenclatural gender of Sceletolepisma as feminine, but in 2018 the International Commission on Zoological Nomenclature issued a formal ruling (ICZN Opinion 2427) stating the gender of Lepisma (and all genera with that ending) is neuter, following ICZN Article 30, which resulted in changes to the spelling of several species.

== Diversity ==
There are roughly 40 extant species presently recognized as valid in the genus:

- Sceletolepisma activum (Silvestri, 1922)
- Sceletolepisma albidum (Escherich, 1905)
- Sceletolepisma arenicola (Wygodzinsky, 1955)
- Sceletolepisma boschimanum Irish, 1996
- Sceletolepisma canariense Mendes, Molero-Baltanas, Bach de Roca & Gaju-Ricart, 1993
- Sceletolepisma capense Irish, 1987
- Sceletolepisma corvinum (Silvestri, 1908)
- Sceletolepisma desperatum Irish, 1987
- Sceletolepisma detritus Irish, 1987
- Sceletolepisma grandipalpe (Escherich, 1905)
- Sceletolepisma huabense Irish, 1988
- Sceletolepisma inornatum Irish, 1987
- Sceletolepisma intercursum (Silvestri, 1922)
- Sceletolepisma kaokoense Irish, 1987
- Sceletolepisma karooense Irish, 1996
- Sceletolepisma latera Irish, 1987
- Sceletolepisma lociplana Irish, 1996
- Sceletolepisma luederitzi Irish, 1987
- Sceletolepisma messor Irish, 1996
- Sceletolepisma michaelseni (Escherich, 1905)
- Sceletolepisma namaquense Irish, 1987
- Sceletolepisma namibense Irish, 1987
- Sceletolepisma occidentale Irish, 1987
- Sceletolepisma orangicum Irish, 1994
- Sceletolepisma ossilitorale Irish, 1987
- Sceletolepisma ovsense Irish, 1994
- Sceletolepisma parcespinatum (Silvestri, 1908)
- Sceletolepisma pauliani Wygodzinsky 1959
- Sceletolepisma penrithae Irish, 1987
- Sceletolepisma placidum Irish, 1987
- Sceletolepisma plusiochaeta (Silvestri, 1922)
- Sceletolepisma prompta Silvestri, 1922
- Sceletolepisma rodriguezi Mendes, Molero-Baltanas, Bach de Roca & Gaju-Ricart, 1993
- Sceletolepisma sanctithomae Mendes, 1993
- Sceletolepisma saxeta Irish, 1987
- Sceletolepisma silvestrii Stach, 1946
- Sceletolepisma spinipes Irish, 1987
- Sceletolepisma subterebrans Irish, 1987
- Sceletolepisma suliptera Irish, 1994
- Sceletolepisma ugabense Irish, 1987
