= M. domestica =

M. domestica may refer to:

- Malus domestica, the apple tree, a plant species
- Monodelphis domestica, the gray short-tailed opossum, a mammal species
- Musca domestica, the housefly, a fly species

== See also ==
- Domestica (disambiguation)
