= Leucolepisma =

Scientific classification
- Kingdom: Animalia
- Phylum: Arthropoda
- Class: Insecta
- Order: Zygentoma
- Family: Lepismatidae
- Genus: Leucolepisma; Wall, 1954
- Species: L. arenarium

Binomial name
- Leucolepisma arenarium Wall, 1954

Genus of silverfishes

Leucolepisma is a genus of silverfish in the family Lepismatidae of the order Zygentoma, containing only one described species, Leucolepisma arenarium.
