= Macrotera opuntiae =

Scientific classification
- Domain: Eukaryota
- Kingdom: Animalia
- Phylum: Arthropoda
- Class: Insecta
- Order: Hymenoptera
- Family: Andrenidae
- Genus: Macrotera
- Species: M. opuntiae

Binomial name
- Macrotera opuntiae (Cockerell, 1922)

Species of bee

Macrotera opuntiae, the sandstone mining bee, is a species of bee in the family Andrenidae. It is found in North America. As the specific name suggests, these bees are pollinators of Opuntia cacti.
