= Allacrotelsa =

Scientific classification
- Domain: Eukaryota
- Kingdom: Animalia
- Phylum: Arthropoda
- Class: Insecta
- Order: Zygentoma
- Family: Lepismatidae
- Genus: Allacrotelsa; Silvestri, 1935

Species
- Allacrotelsa kraepelini (Escherich, 1905); Allacrotelsa spinulata (Packard, 1873)

Genus of silverfishes

Allacrotelsa is a genus of primitive insects belonging to the family Lepismatidae.
