= Tricholepisma =

Scientific classification
- Kingdom: Animalia
- Phylum: Arthropoda
- Class: Insecta
- Order: Zygentoma
- Family: Lepismatidae
- Genus: Tricholepisma; Paclt, 1967

Species
- Tricholepisma aureum Tricholepisma gravelyi Tricholepisma gyriniforme Tricholepisma indalicum Tricholepisma zulu

Genus of silverfishes

Tricholepisma is a genus of silverfish belonging to the family Lepismatidae.

== Nomenclature ==
Most authors have historically treated the nomenclatural gender of Tricholepisma as feminine, but in 2018 the International Commission on Zoological Nomenclature issued a formal ruling (ICZN Opinion 2427) stating the gender of Lepisma (and all genera with that ending) is neuter, following ICZN Article 30, which resulted in changes to the spelling of several species.
