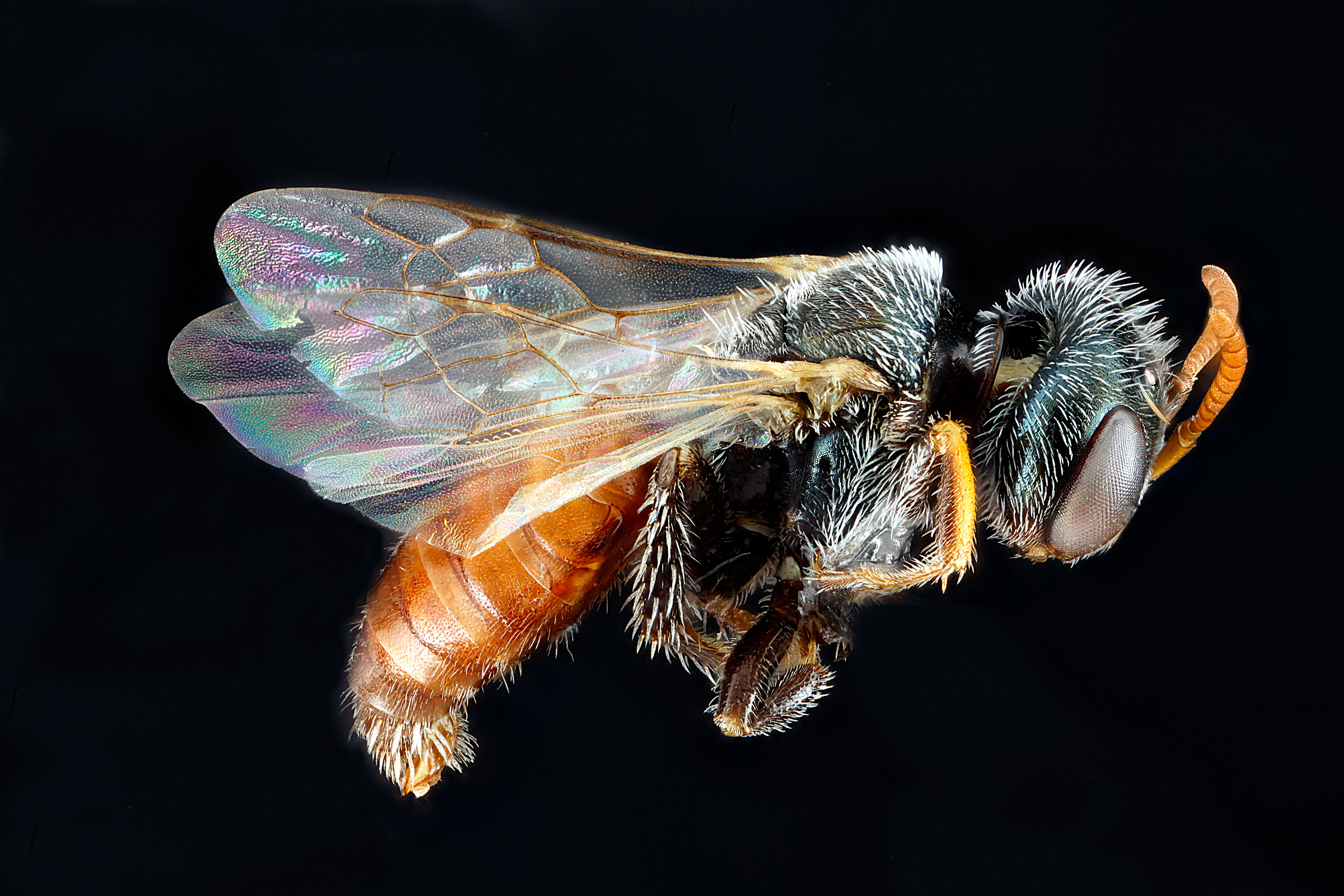

Scientific classification
- Kingdom: Animalia
- Phylum: Arthropoda
- Class: Insecta
- Order: Hymenoptera
- Family: Andrenidae
- Subfamily: Panurginae
- Genus: Macrotera
- Species: M. latior

Binomial name
- Macrotera latior (Cockerell, 1896)

= Macrotera latior =

Species of bee

Macrotera latior is a species of bee in the family Andrenidae. It is found in Central America and North America.
