= Domesticum =

Domesticum may refer to:

== Plants ==
- Lansium domesticum, a synonym of Lansium parasiticum, a species of fruit-bearing tree
- Philodendron domesticum, the spadeleaf philodendron or Burgundy philodendron, a plant species
- Pelargonium × domesticum, the Regal variety or French geranium, a plant species

== Animals ==
- Trypodendron domesticum, a beetle

== See also ==
- Including use as a species name
- List of Latin and Greek words commonly used in systematic names
- Domestica (disambiguation)
- Domesticus (disambiguation)
