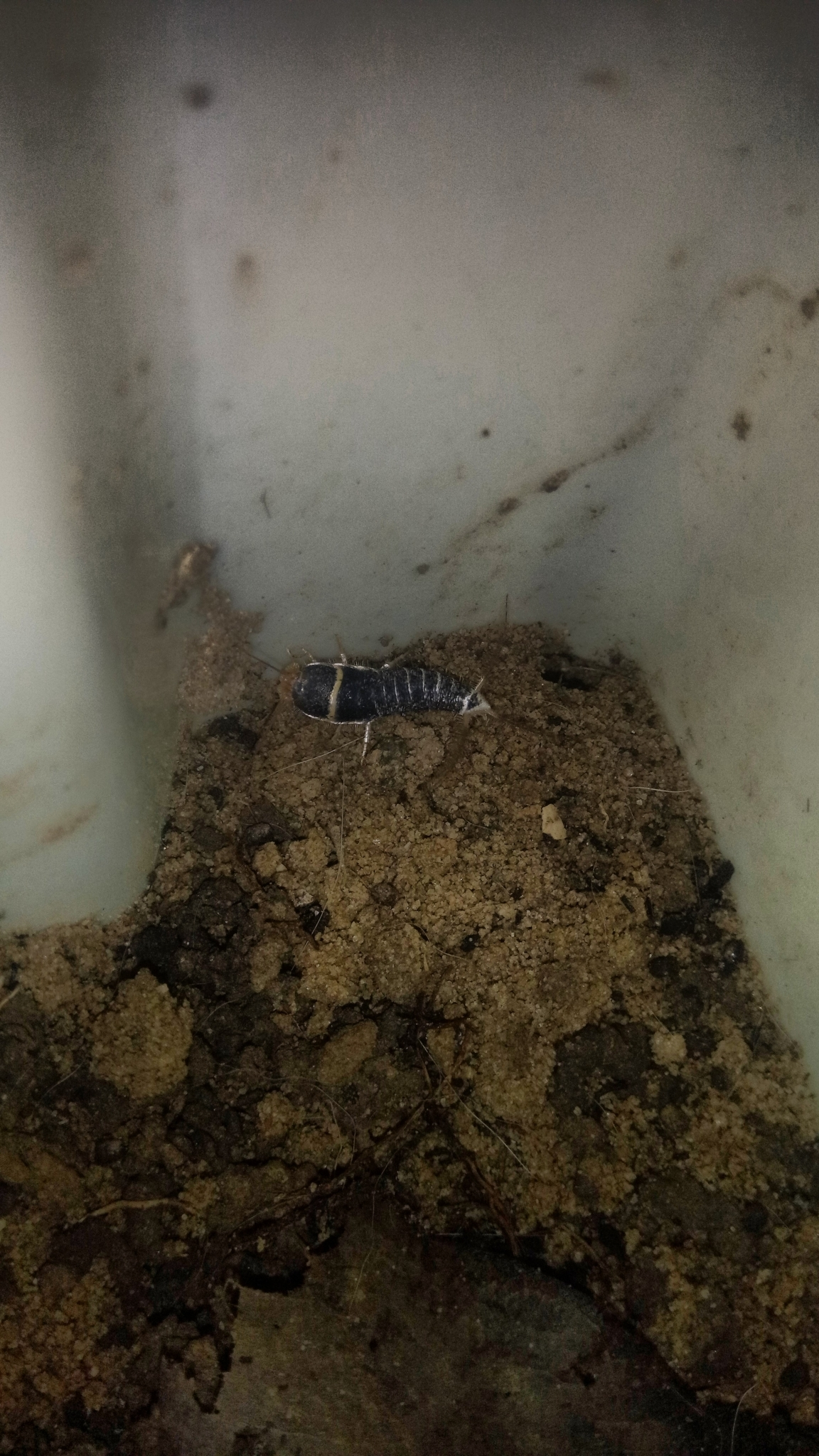
- A picture of Acrotelsa collaris

Scientific classification
- Domain: Eukaryota
- Kingdom: Animalia
- Phylum: Arthropoda
- Class: Insecta
- Order: Zygentoma
- Family: Lepismatidae
- Genus: Acrotelsa; Escherich, 1905

= Acrotelsa =

Genus of silverfishes

Acrotelsa is a genus of silverfish in the family Lepismatidae. There are at least two described species in Acrotelsa.

== Species ==
These two species belong to the genus Acrotelsa:

- Acrotelsa collaris (Fabricius, 1793)
- Acrotelsa galapagoensis Guthrie
