= Neoasterolepisma =

Scientific classification
- Domain: Eukaryota
- Kingdom: Animalia
- Phylum: Arthropoda
- Class: Insecta
- Order: Zygentoma
- Family: Lepismatidae
- Genus: Neoasterolepisma; Mendes, 1988

Species
- see text

Genus of silverfishes

Neoasterolepisma is a genus of primitive insects belonging to the family Lepismatidae. Many species live with ants.

== Species ==
- Neoasterolepisma angustothoracicum (Grassi & Rovelli, 1889)
- Neoasterolepisma balcanicum (Stach, 1922)
- Neoasterolepisma balearicum Molero-Baltanas, Bach de Roca & Gaju-Ricart, 1998 (1997)
- Neoasterolepisma basilewskyi (Wygodzinsky, 1955)
- Neoasterolepisma bicolorellum (Silvestri, 1949)
- Neoasterolepisma braunsi (Escherich, 1903)
- Neoasterolepisma caecum Molero-Baltanas, Bach de Roca & Gaju-Ricart, 1999
- Neoasterolepisma crassipes (Escherich, 1905)
- Neoasterolepisma curtiseta Mendes, 1988
- Neoasterolepisma delamarei Mendes, 1988
- Neoasterolepisma delator Molero-Baltanas, Bach de Roca & Gaju-Ricart, 1996
- Neoasterolepisma deserticola (Kaplin, 1980)
- Neoasterolepisma evansi (Silvestri, 1923)
- Neoasterolepisma foreli (Moniez, 1894)
- Neoasterolepisma gauthieri (Wygodzinsky, 1941)
- Neoasterolepisma hespericum Molero-Baltanas, Bach de Roca & Gaju-Ricart, 1996
- Neoasterolepisma imitans (Mendes, 1980)
- Neoasterolepisma inexpectatum Molero-Baltanas, Bach de Roca & Gaju-Ricart, 1993
- Neoasterolepisma insulare Mendes, 1993
- Neoasterolepisma lusitanum (Wygodzinsky, 1941)
- Neoasterolepisma macropenne Mendes, 1985
- Neoasterolepisma magnicauda (Silvestri, 1908)
- Neoasterolepisma myrmecobium (Silvestri, 1908)
- Neoasterolepisma necrophila Mendes, 1992
- Neoasterolepisma nigericum (Mendes, 1981)
- Neoasterolepisma pallidum Molero-Baltanas, Gaju-Ricart & Bach de Roca, 1995
- Neoasterolepisma palmonii (Wygodzinsky, 1942)
- Neoasterolepisma paucisetosum (Stach, 1935)
- Neoasterolepisma pauperculum (Silvestri, 1907)
- Neoasterolepisma pelagodromae Mendes, 1988
- Neoasterolepisma priesneri (Stach, 1946)
- Neoasterolepisma psammophila (Kaplin, 1980)
- Neoasterolepisma santschii (Silvestri, 1908)
- Neoasterolepisma scorpius Mendes, 1993
- Neoasterolepisma soerenseni (Silvestri, 1908)
- Neoasterolepisma spectabiloides Mendes, 1988
- Neoasterolepisma stachi (Wygodzinsky, 1941)
- Neoasterolepisma vanharteni Mendes, 1998
- Neoasterolepisma vulcana Mendes, Bach de Roca & Gaju-Ricart, 1992 (1993)
- Neoasterolepisma wasmanni (Moniez, 1894)
