= Macrotera texana =

Scientific classification
- Domain: Eukaryota
- Kingdom: Animalia
- Phylum: Arthropoda
- Class: Insecta
- Order: Hymenoptera
- Family: Andrenidae
- Genus: Macrotera
- Species: M. texana

Binomial name
- Macrotera texana Cresson, 1878

Species of bee

Macrotera texana, the Texas macrotera, is a species of bee in the family Andrenidae. It is found in Central America and North America.
