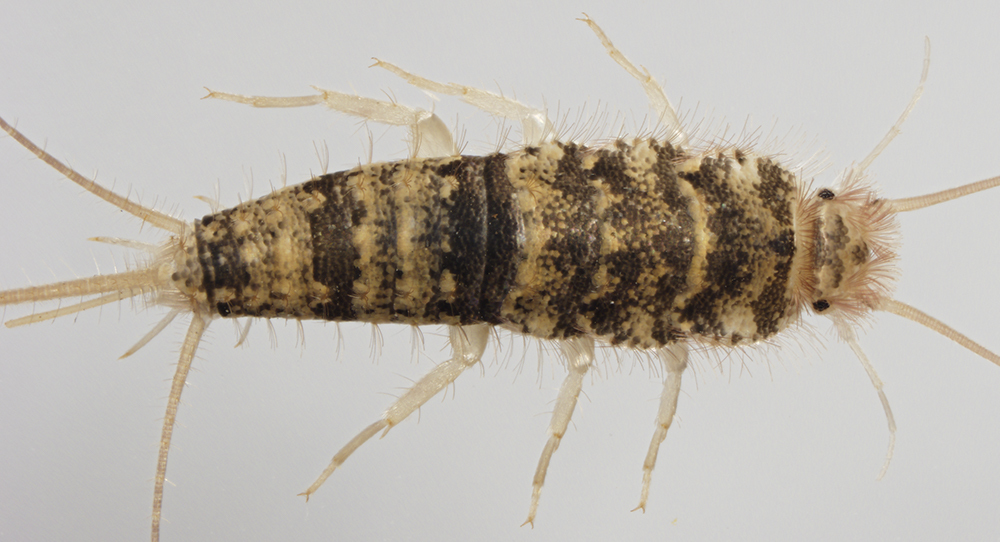
- Thermobia domestica

Scientific classification
- Kingdom: Animalia
- Phylum: Arthropoda
- Class: Insecta
- Order: Zygentoma
- Family: Lepismatidae
- Genus: Thermobia; Bergroth, 1890

Species
- Thermobia aegyptiaca; Thermobia campbelli; Thermobia domestica - firebrat

Synonyms
- Lepismodes Newman, 1863; Termophila Grassi, 1887; Thermophila Grassi & Rovelli, 1889

= Thermobia =

Genus of silverfishes

Thermobia (from Ancient Greek θερμός (thermós), meaning "warmth", and βίος (bíos), meaning "life"] is a genus of silverfishes belonging to the family Lepismatidae. The genus was first erected as Termophila by Giovanni Battista Grassi in 1887, emended to Thermophila two years later, and renamed to Thermobia by Ernst Evald Bergroth in 1890. By far the best known member of the genus is the firebrat (T. domestica), which is often seen in warm places indoors such as bakeries.
