= Neoasterolepisma wasmanni =

Scientific classification
- Domain: Eukaryota
- Kingdom: Animalia
- Phylum: Arthropoda
- Class: Insecta
- Order: Zygentoma
- Family: Lepismatidae
- Genus: Neoasterolepisma
- Species: N. wasmanni

Binomial name
- Neoasterolepisma wasmanni (Moniez, 1894)

Synonyms
- Lepisma wasmanni Moniez, 1894; Lepisma skorikowi Escherich, 1905; Lepisma iberica Stach, 1930; Lepisma spectabilis Wygodzinsky, 1945; Neoasterolepisma wasmannii Auctt. (misspelling)

Species of silverfish

Neoasterolepisma wasmanni is a species of silverfish in the family Lepismatidae.
