= Stylifera =

Scientific classification
- Domain: Eukaryota
- Kingdom: Animalia
- Phylum: Arthropoda
- Class: Insecta
- Order: Zygentoma
- Family: Lepismatidae
- Genus: Stylifera; Stach, 1932

Genus of silverfishes

Stylifera is a genus of silverfish in the family Lepismatidae. There are at least two described species in Stylifera.

== Species ==
These two species belong to the genus Stylifera:

- Stylifera gigantea (Escherich, 1905)
- Stylifera impudica (Escherich, 1905)
