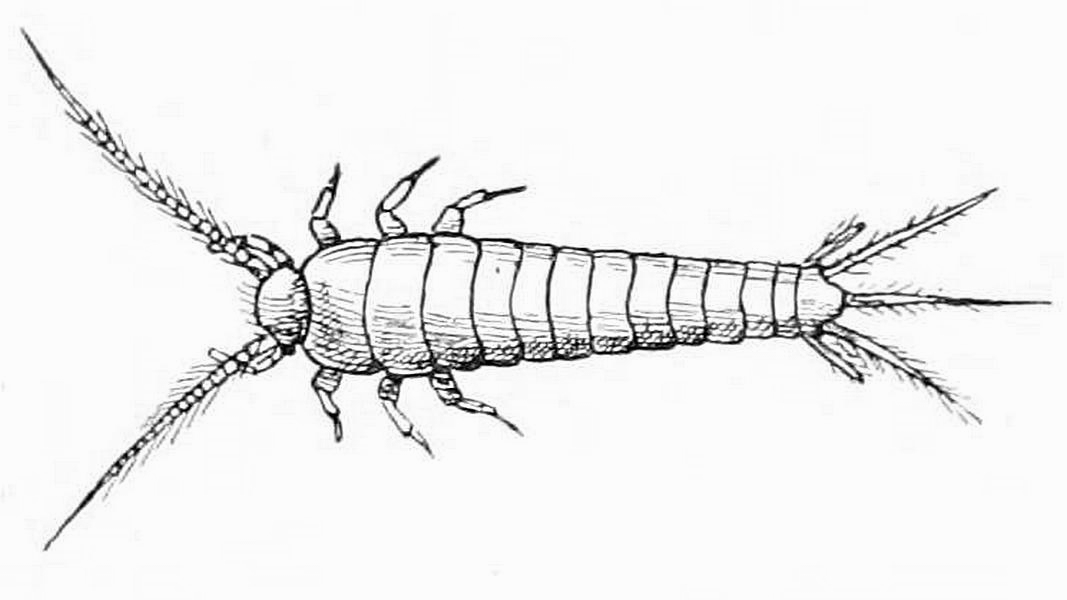

Scientific classification
- Kingdom: Animalia
- Phylum: Arthropoda
- Clade: Pancrustacea
- Class: Insecta
- Order: Zygentoma
- Family: Lepismatidae
- Genus: Lepisma
- Species: L. chlorosoma

Binomial name
- Lepisma chlorosoma Lucas, 1846

= Lepisma chlorosoma =

Species of silverfish

Lepisma chlorosoma is a species of wingless silverfish in the family Lepismatidae. It occurs in the western Mediterranean Basin, with confirmed records in southern Europe (Portugal, Spain, mainland Italy including Sicily and Sardinia, and recently Croatia) and North Africa (Morocco, Algeria, Tunisia).

== Etymology & Taxonomy ==
Lepisma chlorosoma was described in 1846 by the French entomologist Hippolyte Lucas. The name chlorosoma derives from the Greek chlōros (green) and sōma (body), referring to the insect's greenish coloration. Several 19th–20th century names have been applied to this taxon; for example, Lepisma lucasi Grassi & Rovelli, 1889 and Lepisma demissa Silvestri, 1908 are now considered synonyms of L. chlorosoma.

== Habitat ==
L. chlorosoma typically inhabits Mediterranean climates. Unlike L. baeticum, which is often found under stones or leaf litter, L. chlorosoma is usually encountered under the bark of living trees (notably in olive and carob groves), as Lucas originally noted in Algeria. It has also been collected in other cryptic sites and occasionally in or near ant nests.

== Morphology ==
This species has the characteristic silverfish form: an elongated, flattened body with long antennae, three caudal filaments, and a covering of scales. The coloration is distinctive: the head and antennae are dark, while the thorax and abdomen are a metallic dark green (sometimes with reddish hues toward the middle of each segment). The bases of the thoracic segments are pale, and whitish marks appear along the abdomen. The legs and palps are yellowish, with some reddish tones on the lateral setae. This green-and-white color pattern sets L. chlorosoma apart from many other Lepisma. However, it closely resembles L. baeticum in overall appearance. Differentiation again depends on microscopic details of chaetotaxy. In particular, the number of bristles in the infralateral groups on abdominal tergites III–VIII is diagnostic: L. chlorosoma has two macrochaetae in each of those groups, whereas L. baeticum has only one. (Entomologist Jashandeep Shostak similarly notes that such fine bristle counts, visible only under magnification, are needed to reliably separate the species.)

== Myrmecophilous Tendencies ==
Lepisma chlorosoma is also a facultative myrmecophile. It is frequently associated with nests of ants, including genera such as Bothriomyrmex, Camponotus, Crematogaster, Pheidole, Tapinoma, and Tetramorium. Its myrmecophily is underpinned by chemical mimicry: silverfish acquire the host colony’s hydrocarbon cues rather than producing their own unique blend. Parmentier et al. (2022) found that facultative associates like L. chlorosoma can "flexibly match" the CHC profile of different host species, effectively "wearing" the colony’s chemical signature. As with L. baeticum, L. chlorosoma does not become fully integrated. It generally avoids direct contact with workers and stays at the periphery of the nest. When silverfish are encountered, they tend to provoke some aggression from the ants, though attacks are usually of moderate intensity.
