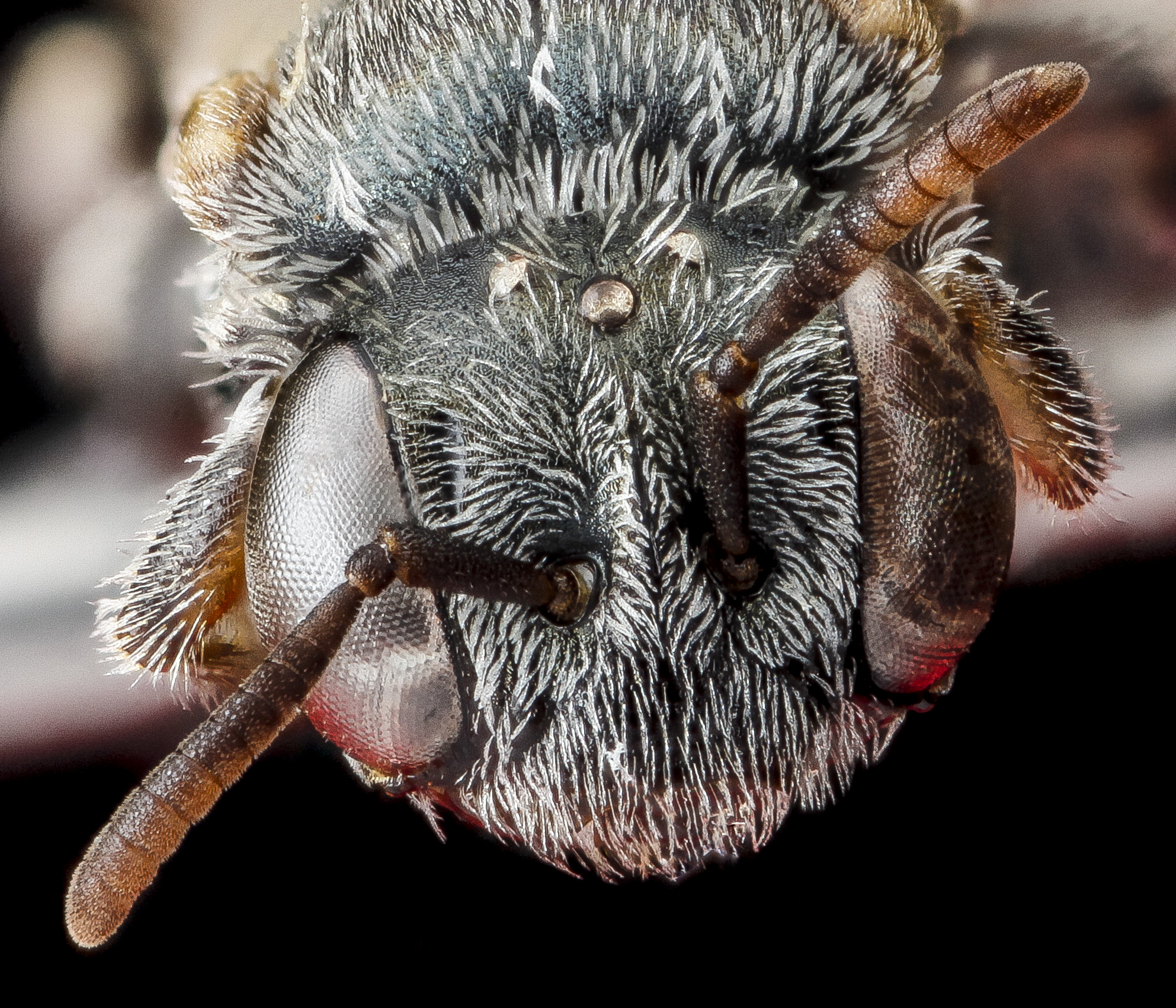
- Macrotera latior, female

Scientific classification
- Kingdom: Animalia
- Phylum: Arthropoda
- Class: Insecta
- Order: Hymenoptera
- Family: Andrenidae
- Subfamily: Panurginae
- Genus: Macrotera; Smith, 1853

Species
- 31

= Macrotera =

Genus of bees

Macrotera is a genus of bees native to North America, particularly diverse in the desert regions of the United States and Mexico. According to Wilson and Carril, there are "around 30" species of Macrotera. Macrotera are small to medium sized (2.0 mm to 16.0 mm) and often black or reddish in coloration. The genus was treated by P.H. Timberlake who, in addition to T.D.A. Cockerell, described most of the known species. Macrotera used to be considered part of the genus Perdita but was split apart by C.D. Michener in 2000. Most species are extreme specialists (oligoleges) with respect to pollen and will only collect pollen from a few closely related species or genera of plants, particularly the plant genus Sphaeralcea and various Cactaceae.

== Species ==
These 31 species belong to the genus Macrotera:

- Macrotera anthracina (Timberlake, 1980)^{i c g}
- Macrotera arcuata (Fox, 1893)^{i c g}
- Macrotera azteca (Timberlake, 1954)^{i c g}
- Macrotera bicolor Smith, 1853^{i c g}
- Macrotera bidenticauda (Timberlake, 1953)^{i c g}
- Macrotera carinata (Timberlake, 1968)^{i c g}
- Macrotera crassa (Timberlake, 1958)^{i c g}
- Macrotera echinocacti (Timberlake, 1954)^{i c g b} (barrel cactus macrotera)
- Macrotera haplura (Cockerell, 1922)^{i c g}
- Macrotera knulli (Timberlake, 1960)^{i c g}
- Macrotera laticauda (Timberlake, 1953)^{i c g}
- Macrotera latior (Cockerell, 1896)^{i c g b}
- Macrotera lobata (Timberlake, 1953)^{i c g}
- Macrotera magniceps (Timberlake, 1960)^{i c g}
- Macrotera mellea (Timberlake, 1954)^{i c g}
- Macrotera mortuaria (Timberlake, 1954)^{i c g}
- Macrotera nahua (Snelling & Danforth, 1992)^{i c g}
- Macrotera nigrella (Timberlake, 1954)^{i c g}
- Macrotera opacella (Timberlake, 1956)^{i c g}
- Macrotera opuntiae (Cockerell, 1922)^{i c g b} (sandstone mining bee)
- Macrotera parkeri (Timberlake, 1980)^{i c g}
- Macrotera peninsularis (Timberlake, 1968)^{i c g}
- Macrotera pipiyolin (Snelling & Danforth, 1992)^{i c g}
- Macrotera portalis (Timberlake, 1954)^{i c g}
- Macrotera robertsi (Timberlake, 1968)^{i c g}
- Macrotera rubida (Timberlake, 1968)^{i c g}
- Macrotera seminigra (Timberlake, 1956)^{i c g}
- Macrotera sinaloana (Timberlake, 1958)^{i c g}
- Macrotera solitaria (Cockerell, 1897)^{i c g}
- Macrotera texana Cresson, 1878^{i c g b} (Texas macrotera)
- Macrotera tristella (Timberlake, 1954)^{i c g}

Data sources: i = ITIS, c = Catalogue of Life, g = GBIF, b = Bugguide.net
