= Macrotera echinocacti =

Scientific classification
- Domain: Eukaryota
- Kingdom: Animalia
- Phylum: Arthropoda
- Class: Insecta
- Order: Hymenoptera
- Family: Andrenidae
- Subfamily: Panurginae
- Genus: Macrotera
- Species: M. echinocacti

Binomial name
- Macrotera echinocacti (Timberlake, 1954)

Species of bee

Macrotera echinocacti, the barrel cactus macrotera, is a species of bee in the family Andrenidae. It is found in Central America and North America.
