= Prolepismina =

Scientific classification
- Domain: Eukaryota
- Kingdom: Animalia
- Phylum: Arthropoda
- Class: Insecta
- Order: Zygentoma
- Family: Lepismatidae
- Genus: Prolepismina; Silvestri, 1940
- Species: P. tuxeni

Binomial name
- Prolepismina tuxeni Mendes, 1982

Genus of silverfishes

Prolepismina is a genus of silverfish in the family Lepismatidae. There is one described species in Prolepismina, P. tuxeni.
