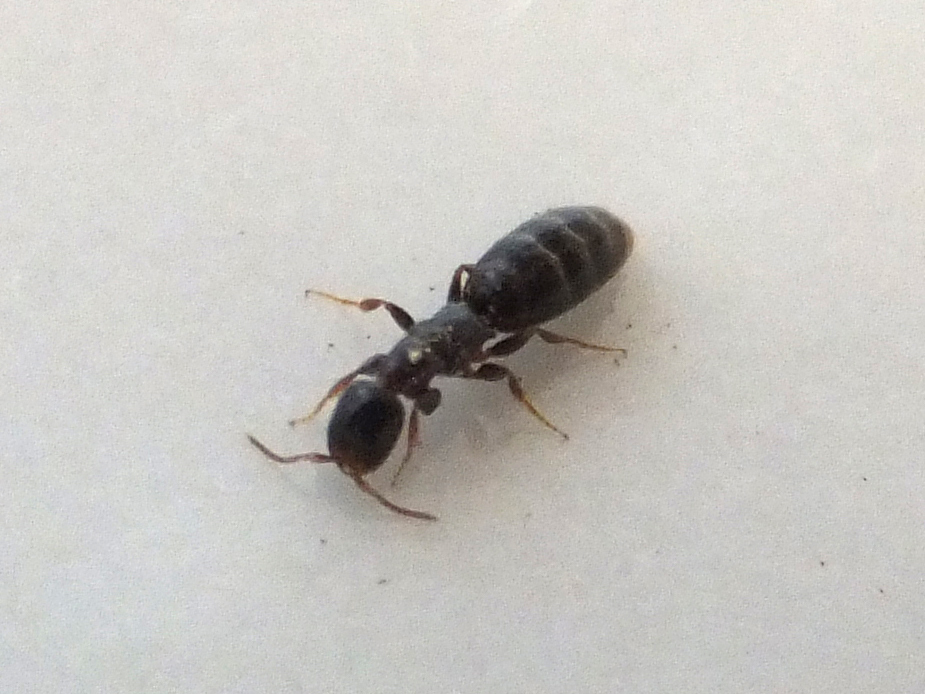

Scientific classification
- Kingdom: Animalia
- Phylum: Arthropoda
- Class: Insecta
- Order: Hymenoptera
- Family: Bethylidae
- Genus: Sclerodermus
- Species: S. domesticus

Binomial name
- Sclerodermus domesticus Latreille, 1809

Synonyms
- Scleroderma domesticus; Scleroderma domesticum; Scleroderma domestica

= Sclerodermus domesticus =

Species of wasp

Sclerodermus domesticus, also known as Scleroderma domesticus, Scleroderma domesticum, Scleroderma domestica or "antiquarian's friend", is a species of flat wasp in the insect genus Sclerodermus. It was first described by Pierre André Latreille in 1809.

== Description ==
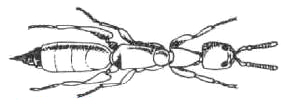
Diagram of Sclerodermus domesticus

Sclerodermus domesticus preys on Coleoptera including Anobium punctatum, Stegobium paniceum, Lasioderma serricorne, Hylotrupes bajulus and Nicobium castaneum, or occasionally Lepidoptera.

Males have wings but lack a stinger. Females are 2–5 mm long; they have a stinger but lack wings. They are black/brown, and have the appearance of ants. Females enter woodworm holes, paralyze the woodworm larvae with the venom of the stinger and lay their eggs in the corpses, which form the food for the S. domesticus larvae. This behavior leads to the common name of "antiquarian's friend".

== Distribution and habitat ==
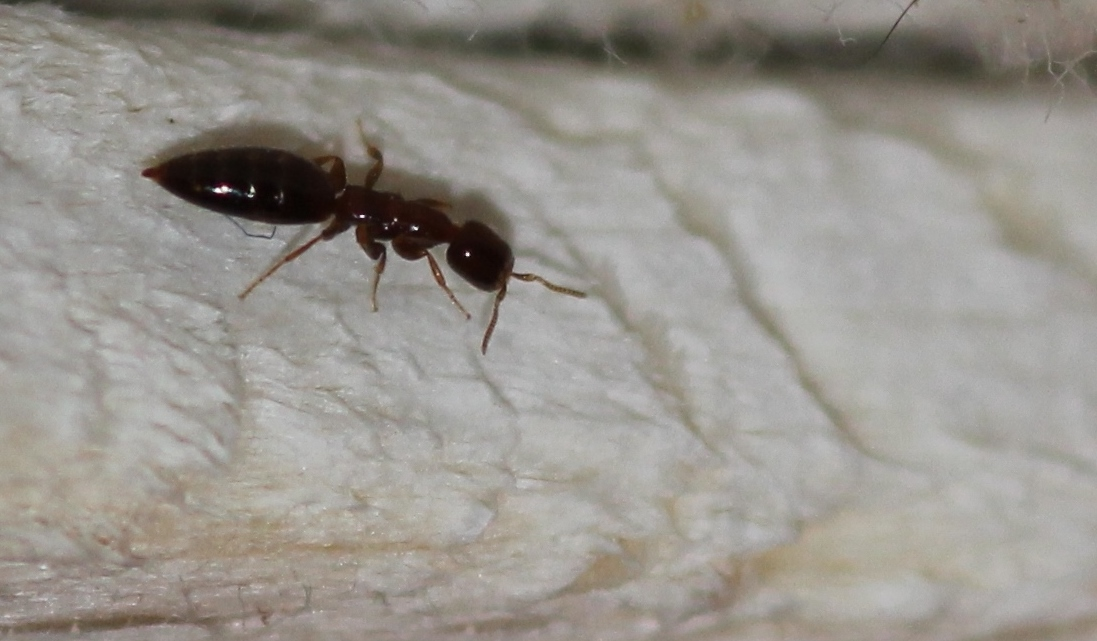
Sclerodermus domesticus

S. domesticus is a cosmopolitan species. It prefers mild weather. There are reports of the species in Spain, Italy, France, Portugal, (Germany), United Kingdom, former Yugoslavia, Near East, United States and Costa Rica. It can be found inside homes, mostly in old furniture, harboring woodworms. Stings are painful and can cause rash or dermatitis.
