= Tricholepisma aureum =

Scientific classification
- Domain: Eukaryota
- Kingdom: Animalia
- Phylum: Arthropoda
- Class: Insecta
- Order: Zygentoma
- Family: Lepismatidae
- Genus: Tricholepisma
- Species: T. aureum

Binomial name
- Tricholepisma aureum (Dufour, 1831)

Species of silverfish

Tricholepisma aureum is a species of silverfish in the family Lepismatidae.
