= Voltinism =

Number of generations or broods of an organism per year

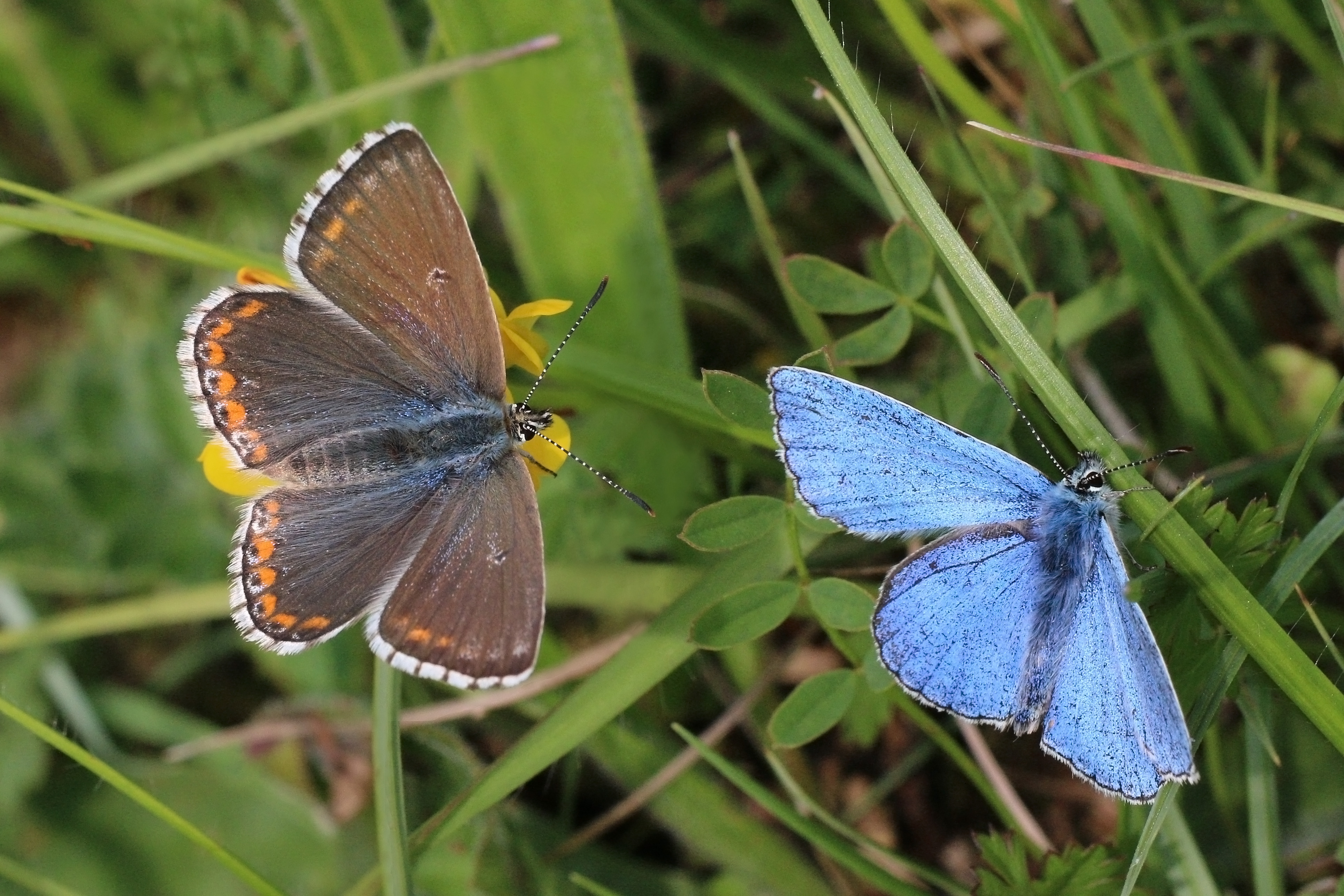
The Adonis blue butterfly (female and male pictured) is a bivoltine species, having two generations a year.

Voltinism is a term used in biology to indicate the number of broods or generations that an organism has each year. The term is most often applied to insects, and is particularly in use in sericulture, in which silkworm varieties vary in their voltinism.

The following adjectives describe organisms:

- Univoltine (monovoltine) – having one brood or generation per year
- Bivoltine (divoltine) – having two broods or generations per year
- Trivoltine – having three broods or generations per year
- Multivoltine (polyvoltine) – having more than two broods or generations per year
- Semivoltine – with two meanings:

- being less than univoltine; having a brood or generation less often than once per year
- having a generation time that lasts more than one year.

== Examples ==
The speckled wood butterfly is univoltine in the northern part of its range, e.g., northern Scandinavia. Adults emerge in late spring, mate, and die shortly after laying eggs; their offspring will grow until pupation, enter diapause in anticipation of the winter, and emerge as adults the following year – thus resulting in a single generation of butterflies per year. In southern Scandinavia, the same species is bivoltine – here, the offspring of spring-emerging adults will develop directly into adults during the summer, mate, and die. Their offspring in turn constitute a second generation, which is the generation that will enter winter diapause and emerge as adults (and mate) in the spring of the following year. This results in a pattern of one short-lived generation (c. 2–3 months) that breeds during the summer, and one long-lived generation (c. 9–10 months) that diapauses through the winter and breeds in the spring. The Rocky Mountain parnassian and the high brown fritillary are more examples of univoltine butterfly species.

The bee species Macrotera portalis is bivoltine, and is estimated to have about 2 or 3 broods annually. During winter, individuals remain in diapause, in their pharate or prepupal stage. This diapause stage continues until metamorphosis in the next spring or summer, whereupon the bees emerge as adults. Another example of a bivoltine species is Cyclosa turbinata which is known to reproduce once in the late spring and once again in the fall.

The Dawson's burrowing bee is an example of a univoltine insect of the order Hymenoptera. The brood of one winter will remain dormant underground until the following winter, and then will surface from their burrows to mate once, and establish new nests.

=== Partial voltinism ===
The term partial voltinism is used to refer to two different (but not necessarily exclusive) situations:

- An organism wherein generations overlap in time, and so are not completely reproductively isolated. For example, in bees of the subfamily Halictinae, one generation is produced in the early summer and one in the late summer, but males produced in the early summer may also mate in the late summer.
- (More commonly) a population where the voltinism is mixed, because of genetic variation (e.g., in the hybrid zone between a univoltine and a bivoltine area) and/or because environmental stimuli do not induce bivoltinism in all individuals (or across all years). For example, far-northern populations of the green-veined white butterfly Pieris napi are mostly univoltine, but some individuals may avert diapause and produce an additional generation under warm conditions.

== Evolution ==
The number of breeding cycles in a year is under genetic control in many species and they are evolved in response to the environment. Many phytophagous species that are dependent on seasonal plant resources are univoltine. Some such species have the ability to diapause for a large part of the year, typically during a cold winter. Others that bore in wood or other low-grade, but plentiful, food material may spend nearly the entire year feeding, with only brief pupal, adult and egg stages to complete a univoltine life cycle. Yet other species that live in tropical regions with little seasonality may be highly multivoltine, with several generations feeding on constantly growing vegetation (such as some species of Saturniidae), or continually renewed detritus, such as Drosophila and many other genera of flies with a life cycle of just a week or two.

== See also ==
- Semelparity and iteroparity
