= Mirolepisma =

Scientific classification
- Kingdom: Animalia
- Phylum: Arthropoda
- Class: Insecta
- Order: Zygentoma
- Family: Lepismatidae
- Genus: Mirolepisma; Silvestri, 1938
- Species: M. deserticola

Binomial name
- Mirolepisma deserticola Silvestri, 1938

Genus of silverfishes

Mirolepisma is a genus of silverfish in the family Lepismatidae, containing only a single species, Mirolepisma deserticola.
