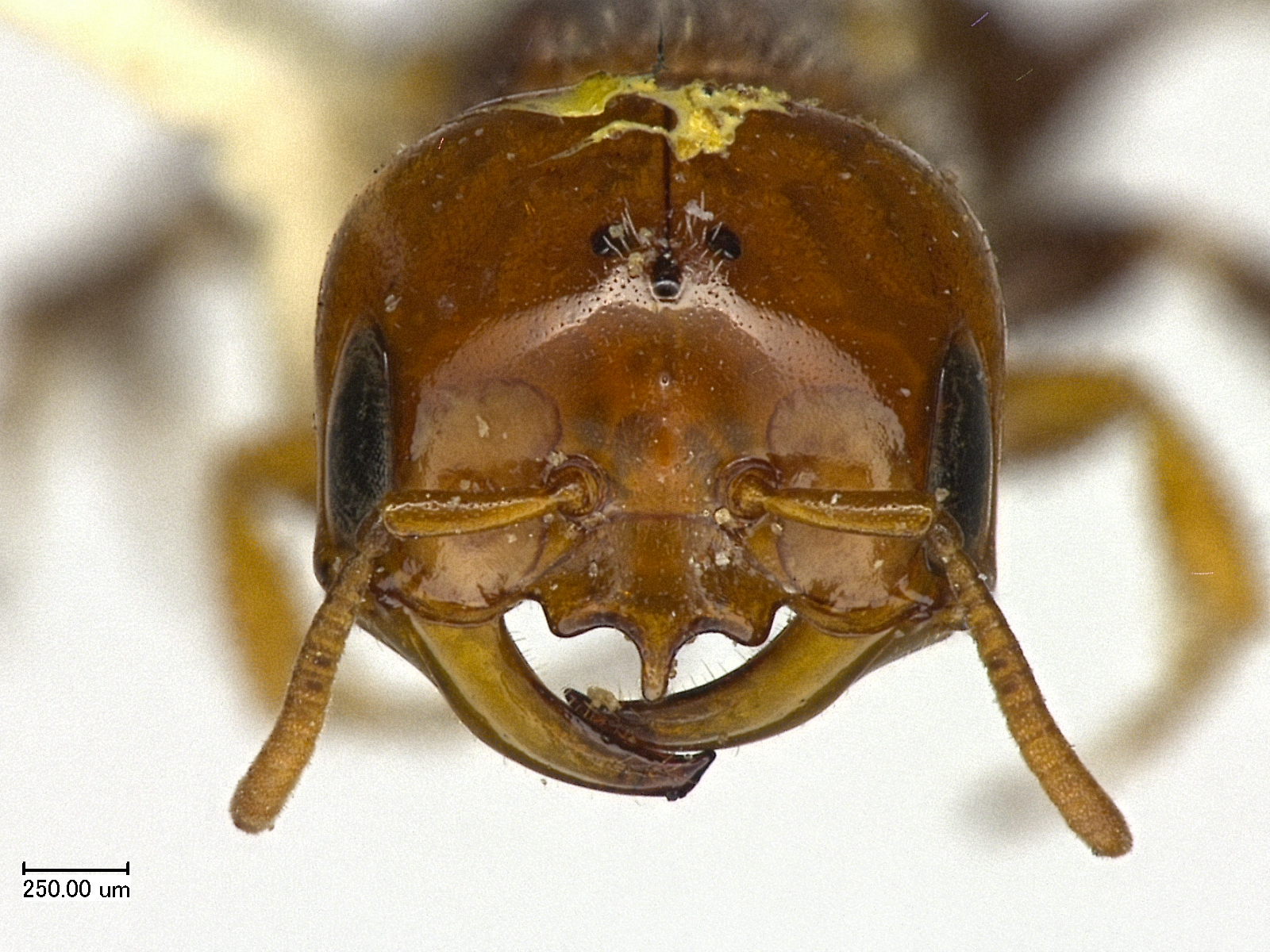
- Face of a large-headed, flightless male of Macrotera portalis. Specimen is deposited in the Snow Entomological Museum at the University of Kansas (accession #SMO290071). Yellow paint on top of head was used to mark the specimen during nesting studies.

Scientific classification
- Kingdom: Animalia
- Phylum: Arthropoda
- Class: Insecta
- Order: Hymenoptera
- Family: Andrenidae
- Genus: Macrotera
- Species: M. portalis

Binomial name
- Macrotera portalis (Timberlake, 1954)

Synonyms
- Perdita portalis Timberlake, 1954

= Macrotera portalis =

Species of bee

Macrotera portalis is a species of communal, ground nesting, partially bivoltine bees found in arid grasslands and desert regions of North America. An oligolectic bee, M. portalis gathers pollen only from plants in the genus Sphaeralcea and has patterns of seasonal emergence to survive the harsh conditions of the desert, with emergence delayed until monsoon rains arrive.

== Taxonomy and phylogenetics ==
Macrotera portalis is in the order Hymenoptera, family Andrenidae, genus Macrotera. This species was formerly in Perdita, a very large genus that now contains around 600 species of bees which are located primarily in northern Mexico and the arid southwestern United States. Around 30 species removed from Perdita were placed in the genus Macrotera.

== Description and identification ==
Macrotera portalis is a small (~7 mm), dark bee species. Like most andrenids, it has small depressions between the eyes and the antennal bases called facial foveae. In M. portalis, males are dimorphic, meaning that they have two distinct size classes.

Macrotera portalis is closely related to Macrotera texana. Both species are communal, females have provision over one cell each day, and intranest mating is common. Macrotera portalis, however, has more females in each nest, and nests are often re-used for multiple years. Males of M. texana are not dimorphic, and nests are usually not reused for several generations.

== Distribution and habitat ==
The species is found in arid grassland and desert regions in northern Mexico, Arizona, and New Mexico.

== Nesting biology ==
As is typical for the family Andrenidae, M. portalis is a ground nesting bee. Macrotera portalis are also communal, with many females often sharing the same nest while provisioning their own individual nest cells. Macrotera portalis nests are tunnels with small side chambers called "brood cells", that contain provision masses composed of pollen and nectar; each cell contains a single provision mass, onto which a single egg is laid before the cell is sealed, and in which the larvae then develop. The females collect and provision only with pollen from plants in the genus Sphaeralcea.

Generally, there are about 2 to 29 adult females in one nest. The female bees are in charge of cell construction, and in the communal nest each female makes one cell per evening, with no evidence of cooperation during construction. If 2 or more females do share a lateral burrow, each seems to maintain the tunnel at the same level; there is no observed cooperative or agonistic behavior. Main and lateral burrows are kept open by packing soil into the side of the burrow walls by all females. Nests are shallow, at most 15 cm deep, though some complex nests that may contain more than 200 cells in an underground area of 20 cm in diameter. The main tunnels are unfinished and extend straight down, while the brood cells are horizontal and have a waterproof lining. The nests remain open during the nesting period and do not have tumuli outside the entrance unless construction of new cells is taking place. Excavation of new tunnels or cells is performed by females using their mandibles to loosen soil, pushing soil backwards with their legs into the open lateral tunnel. The loose soil is cleared by walking backwards and using their legs and metasoma to push the soil into a nearby lateral or main tunnel.

Females typically perform the cycle of cell construction, provisioning, oviposition, and cell closure every day. Females who foraged came back and formed a pollen ball by shaping loose groups of pollen into a sphere. If a male was present, the female would mate with the male during departure from the nest, and 1 or 2 copulations would occur before an egg was laid. After an egg is laid and the cell is closed, a females then leaves the nest for a feeding trip, not returning with any pollen. Cell construction is performed by shaping the cells through repeated packing using the female's pygidial plate, adding soil when needed. Once the chamber is smoothed and packed well enough, hydrophobic lining is added. The cell lining behavior consisted of brushing motions over the cell using the female's metasoma. Females do not open cells after ovipositing or investigate cases of kleptoparasitism or robbing. Communality has been suggested as conferring an advantage due to nest defense for certain wasps and bees, yet the lack of observation of females at the nest entrance for defense demonstrates that defense is not associated with communality for M. portalis. Rather, communality is most likely due to the high cost of solitary nest development.

=== Parasites and predators ===
Blister beetle larvae have been found in nests of M. portalis, making burrows between cells and devouring bee larvae. Nests may also be attacked by Solenopsis molesta, a type of fire ant, which takes pupae as prey items. Velvet ants (Mutillidae) in the genus Pseudomethoca, such as Pseudomethoca perditrix and Pseudomethoca toumeyi, parasitize nests with post-defecating pupae; other brood cells are left alone.

== Seasonal cycle ==
There is partial bivoltinism seen in Macrotera portalis, with about 2 broods, perhaps 3, per year; some larvae are second or third generation adults because they develop and emerge in the same year as their mothers. The period of larval development to adulthood takes at least 21 days. The adult males and females generally emerge in the spring or summer and usually mate following emergence from their cells. Females lay eggs and continue to provision and construct brood cells while larvae develop, and some males remain in the nests. In winter months, larvae remain in diapause, or resting condition, in their prepupal or pharate adult stage. Diapause continues until the next spring or summer monsoon rains, and some of the brood then emerges as adults. Larvae and some prepupae may remain in diapause for more than a year.

=== Bet hedging ===
Bet hedging is characterized through individuals that minimize reproductive success of variance between years. Macrotera portalis practices bet hedging because only a certain portion of bees emerge in any given year, with many remaining in diapause. Although this leads to certain years of lower reproductive success, in years of low resources some offspring will survive and thus the advantages of lower variance may outweigh the disadvantages of reduced average fitness in diverse environments. Since M. portalis lives in a desert environment, in which conditions are extremely unpredictable (between year variation is greater than in any other biome), it is likely that this promotes bet hedging in the species. Overwintering of desert bees have limited adult activity and reproduction during a short period of time after the desert rainy season. Larvae are small, exposed to high temperatures, low humidity, buried in the soil, subject to predation, desiccation, and pathogens.

Induced emergence, in other words rainfall-triggered emergence, is observed within M. portalis, which has a synchronous pattern of emergence consistent with the southwestern desert's late summer monsoon rains. There is evidence of slight protandry and small inclination for emergence of large headed males before small headed males. For a comparison of emerging and diapausing pre-pupae, it was found that the pre-pupae that emerged within the year they were produced were much lighter compared to those who remained for an additional year in diapause. The difference was significant between males and females. This further demonstrates that if a pre-pupa contains sufficient mass (i.e., reserves of resources) to overwinter for another year it does so, while the lighter bees emerge the current year. The lighter bees are found deeper in the soil than those in diapause. Thus, emergence is influenced by larval condition as well as triggered by rainfall.

== Demographics ==
Nests are usually reused for several generations, so bees within nests may be very closely related to each other.

=== Dimorphic males ===
The existence of two different types of males, dimorphism, has been found to be a derived state in this species. The two morphs are defined by characteristics of male shape and head size:

1. Small headed morph that is capable of flight. This morph bears a resemblance to males of other closely related species. After emergence, this morph is seen only on flowers and they are aggressive, combating with males of the same species as well as attacking male and female bees of different species. Small headed males regularly mate with foraging females.

2. Large headed morph that is incapable of flight. This morph has derived traits including flight muscles that are atrophied, enlarged facial foveae, and reduced compound eyes. After emergence, large headed males are seen only in nests alongside females. Large headed males are also belligerent fighters, with fights consisting of attacks with mandibles open, often ending in the death of one male. Further, large headed males are very conscious of female reproductive behavior: during cell provisioning, large headed males linger near open cells; large headed males only mate with the females when forming pollen and nectar balls before oviposition.

=== Sex and morph ratio ===
In one study, out of 167 offspring, 45% were female and 55% were male, reflecting no significant difference from a 1:1 sex ratio. Within males, there are two morphs: small headed males and large headed males, with a 1:1 morph ratio (52.5% large headed males and 47.5% small headed males).

=== Mating behavior ===
Smaller headed males tend to mate outside the nest, whereas the large-headed, flightless males mate within the nest. Head size therefore is linked to mating tactics, specifically fight (large-headed males) or sneak (small-headed males), in order to maximize male fitness regardless of head size. Larval diet and growth influences body size, thus a provisioning female determines which tactic her male offspring will use. It is hypothesized that larger male fighting tactic confers a greater average fitness compared to the smaller male sneaking tactic, but this theory has little supporting evidence.

Resource based engagement sites are usually used by oligolectic bees such as Macrotera portalis. M. portalis has both territorial male behavior in a female emergence site (inside the nests) as well as a resource-based rendezvous site that contains territorial small-headed males, both strategies predicted following the concentration of females in these two specific areas.

== Conservation status ==
Currently, there is no information on the conservation status of this bee species.
