= Agroecius =

Agroecius (or Agroetius) was the name of a number of men from Roman history, most of them distinguished Gauls:

- Agroecius, an Armenian student of the Roman rhetorician Libanius in the 4th century, who was apparently very close to the teacher, wrote that Agroecius was "no different from a son to me." He was quite poor, and had five sisters in need of husbands, and was possibly the brother of another student of Libanius named Eusebius.
- Agroecius, captured and executed with Decimus Rusticus in 413 by the forces of the Roman emperor Honorius.
- Agroecius, a wealthy man, probably not clergy, contributed money for a new church at Narbo when Rusticus of Narbonne was bishop there. He is known only from an inscription on the building dated 445 (the building itself was started in 441), although he may be the same person as the grammarian Agroecius below.
- Agroecius, bishop of Sens, a grammarian who was the author of an extant grammatical work, De Orthographia et Differentia Sermonis.
- Agroecius, bishop of Antibes, was the addressee of one of the letters of Caesarius of Arles.
- Agroecius Domesticus, a man of uncertain date who died at the age of 33, and was buried in Vienne.
