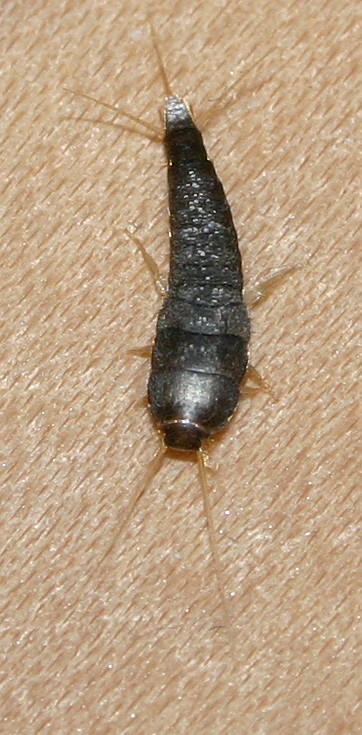
- Silverfish

Scientific classification
- Kingdom: Animalia
- Phylum: Arthropoda
- Class: Insecta
- Order: Zygentoma
- Family: Lepismatidae
- Genus: Lepisma; Linnaeus, 1758

Species
- Lepisma adygei; Lepisma baeticum; Lepisma chlorosoma; Lepisma saccharinum - silverfish; Lepisma umbra; Lepisma xylophila

= Lepisma =

Lepisma Temporal range: Late Miocene–Present

Genus of silverfishes

Lepisma is a genus of primitive insects in the order Zygentoma and the family Lepismatidae.

The most familiar member of the genus Lepisma is the silverfish (L. saccharinum), a cosmopolitan species that likes damp habitats, tends to hide in crevices and is usually found in human habitations, becoming household pests under certain conditions. While the common name silverfish is used throughout the global literature to refer to various species of Zygentoma, the Entomological Society of America restricts use of the term solely for Lepisma saccharinum.

== Nomenclature ==
Most authors have historically treated the nomenclatural gender of Lepisma as feminine, but in 2018 the International Commission on Zoological Nomenclature issued a formal ruling (ICZN Opinion 2427) stating the gender of Lepisma (and all genera with that ending) is neuter, following ICZN Article 30, which resulted in changes to the spelling of several well-known species, including Lepisma saccharinum (formerly saccharina).
