= Dolichopus domesticus =

Scientific classification
- Kingdom: Animalia
- Phylum: Arthropoda
- Clade: Pancrustacea
- Class: Insecta
- Order: Diptera
- Family: Dolichopodidae
- Genus: Dolichopus
- Species: D. domesticus

Binomial name
- Dolichopus domesticus Van Duzee, 1921

Species of fly

Dolichopus domesticus is a species of long-legged fly in the family Dolichopodidae.
