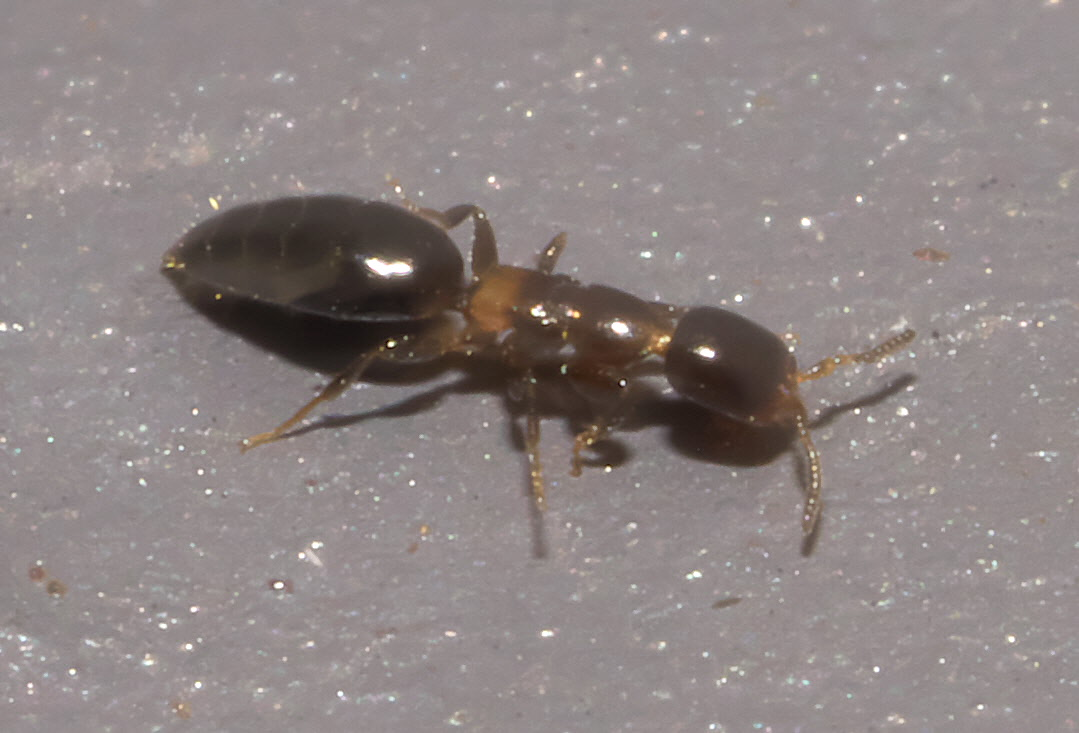

Scientific classification
- Kingdom: Animalia
- Phylum: Arthropoda
- Clade: Pancrustacea
- Class: Insecta
- Order: Hymenoptera
- Family: Bethylidae
- Subfamily: Scleroderminae
- Genus: Sclerodermus; Latreille, 1810

Synonyms
- Sclerodermus Latreille, 1809 (Nom. Nud.); Scleroderma Oken, 1817 (Missp.); Scleroderma Klug, 1809 (Misattribution published in 1829); Scleroderma Westwood, 1839 (Emend.); Schroderma Lepeletier, 1845 (Missp.); Sclerochroa Foerster, 1850; Ateleopterus Foerster, 1856; Schleroderma Costa, 1864 (Missp.); Neoscleroderma Kieffer, 1905; Lepidosternopsis Ogloblin, 1954

= Sclerodermus =

Genus of wasps

Sclerodermus is a genus of chrysidoid wasps in the family Bethylidae. There are at least 20 described species in Sclerodermus.

== Reproduction and sex ratios ==
Species of Sclerodermus exhibit quasi-social behavior: multiple females cooperate to paralyze a host and care for a shared brood. Despite this cooperation, they consistently produce highly female-biased sex ratios often with less than 10% males, even when many mothers are present.

According to classical sex ratio theory, more mothers should lead to a more balanced ratio of sons and daughters, since males would no longer be competing only with their brothers to mate. The extreme female bias in Sclerodermus contradicts this expectation. Recent models suggest that dominant females may influence sex ratios by killing the sons of subordinates or preventing their production, a behavior known as infanticide. These social dynamics help explain the unusual patterns observed in this genus.

== Species ==
- Sclerodermus abdominalis Westwood, 1839^{g}
- Sclerodermus brevicornis Kieffer, 1906^{g}
- Sclerodermus cereicollis Kieffer, 1904^{g}
- Sclerodermus concinnus Saunders, 1881^{g}
- Sclerodermus cylindricus Westwood, 1839^{g}
- Sclerodermus domesticus Latreille, 1809^{g}
- Sclerodermus ephippius Saunders, 1881^{g}
- Sclerodermus fasciatus Westwood, 1839^{g}
- Sclerodermus fonscolombei Westwood, 1881^{g}
- Sclerodermus formiciformis Westwood, 1839^{g}
- Sclerodermus fulvicornis Westwood, 1839^{g}
- Sclerodermus fuscicornis Westwood, 1839^{g}
- Sclerodermus fuscus (Nees, 1834)^{g}
- Sclerodermus gracilis Saunders, 1881^{g}
- Sclerodermus intermedius Westwood, 1839^{g}
- Sclerodermus linearis Westwood, 1881^{g}
- Sclerodermus minutus Westwood, 1839^{g}
- Sclerodermus nipponicus Yuasa, 1930^{g}
- Sclerodermus nitidus Westwood, 1839^{g}
- Sclerodermus pedunculus Westwood, 1839^{g}
- Sclerodermus piceus Westwood, 1839^{g}
- Sclerodermus rufus (Foerster, 1850)^{g}
- Sclerodermus rufescens (Nees, 1834)^{g}
- Sclerodermus sidneyanus Westwood, 1874^{g}

Data sources: i = ITIS, c = Catalogue of Life, g = GBIF, b = Bugguide.net
