= Domestica (disambiguation) =

Domestica may refer to:

== Film ==
- Domestica (film), a film by Zakery Weiss, shown during the 2003 New York Underground Film Festival

== Music ==
- Domestica, a 2000 album by Cursive
- Symphonia Domestica, a tone poem by Richard Strauss
- "Lyra Domestica", a hymn by Friedrich Spitta
- "Violenza Domestica", a song by Mr. Bungle on the album Disco Volante

== Places ==
- Cala Domestica, a narrow bay in the southwest of Sardinia

== Sculpture ==
- Lumia Domestica, a sculpture by Willie Williams

== Species ==
- Iris domestica, the leopard flower
- Nandina domestica, commonly known as heavenly bamboo or sacred bamboo
- Prunus domestica, a species of trees and shrubs commonly called "plums"
- Sorbus domestica, the service tree
- Tegenaria domestica, the barn funnel weaver spider
- Anas platyrhynchos domestica, the Pekin duck or Long Island duck
- Columba livia f. domestica, the domestic pigeon
- Cryphia domestica, the marbled beauty moth
- Lonchura striata domestica, the society finch or Bengalese finch
- Malus domestica, the apple tree
- Monodelphis domestica, the gray short-tailed opossum
- Musca domestica, the housefly
- Serinus canaria domestica, the domestic canary
- Thermobia domestica, the firebrat, a small insect
- Domestica, the taxonomic term

== See also ==
- Including use as a species name
- Domesticus (disambiguation)
- Domesticum (disambiguation)
