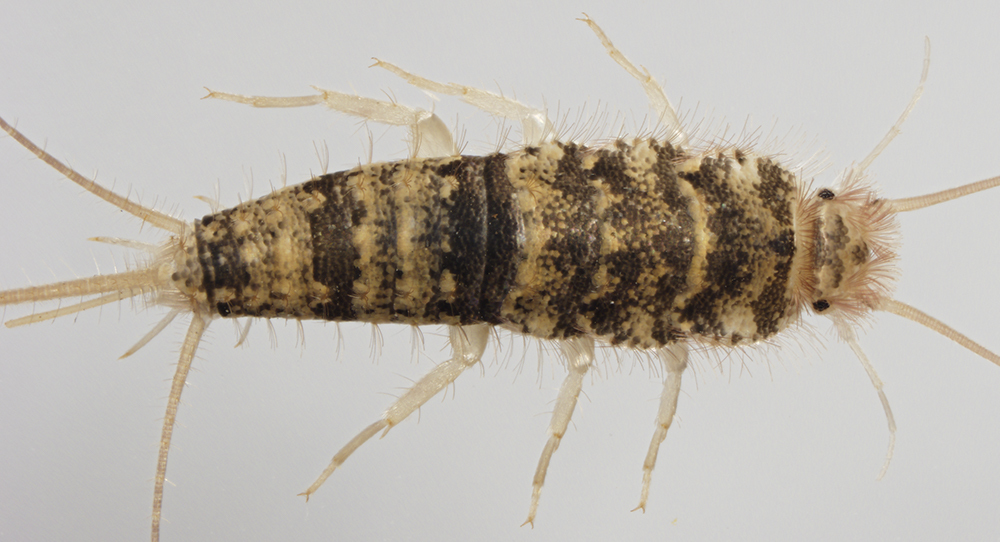

Scientific classification
- Kingdom: Animalia
- Phylum: Arthropoda
- Class: Insecta
- Order: Zygentoma
- Family: Lepismatidae
- Genus: Thermobia
- Species: T. domestica

Binomial name
- Thermobia domestica (Packard, 1873)

Synonyms
- Lepisma domestica Packard, 1873; Lepismodes inquilinus Newman, 1863; Lepisma furnorum Rovelli, 1884

= Firebrat =

Insect similar to a silverfish

The firebrat (Thermobia domestica) is a small insect (typically 1–1.5 cm) in the order Zygentoma. They look similar to the related silverfishes, but are distinguished by their habit of living in warm regions of homes, of which they get their name.

== Description ==
Firebrats prefer relatively warm temperatures (36–39 °C) and require some humidity. They are commonly found indoors near heat sources such as furnaces and boilers. They feed on a wide variety of carbohydrates and starches that are also protein sources such as dog food, flour and book bindings. Firebrats also practice cannibalism, eating the eggs, exuviae and corpses of other firebrats. They are distributed throughout most parts of the world and are normally found outdoors under rocks, plant litter, and in similar environments, but are also often found indoors where they are considered pests. They do not cause major damage, but they can contaminate food, damage paper goods, and stain clothing. Otherwise they are mostly harmless. Due to the fact that, in nature, they tend to live in moist environments, the exoskeleton of firebrats is capable of both retaining and excreting water depending on the ambient temperature in their environment. This allows them to tolerate a wide range of humidity. The eggs of firebrats are small, pearly white ovals, though eggs lain in crevices can assume a more flattened shape. The nymphs of the species appear similar to the adults but are a waxy white color.

== Behavior ==
Historically, it had been assumed that communal behavior in firebrats was induced by pheromones, though this is contested. Modern research suggests communal behavior stems from microbes and fungi found in the feces of other firebrats.

== Breeding ==
At 1.5 to 4.5 months of age the female firebrat begins laying eggs if the temperature is right (32–41 °C or 90–106 °F). It may lay up to 6000 eggs in a lifetime of about 3–5 years. After incubation (12–13 days), the nymphs hatch. They may reach maturity in as little as 2–4 months, resulting in several generations each year.

== Meiosis ==
The sequential changes occurring during the prophase I stage of meiosis in T. domestica ovaries have been described in detail.
