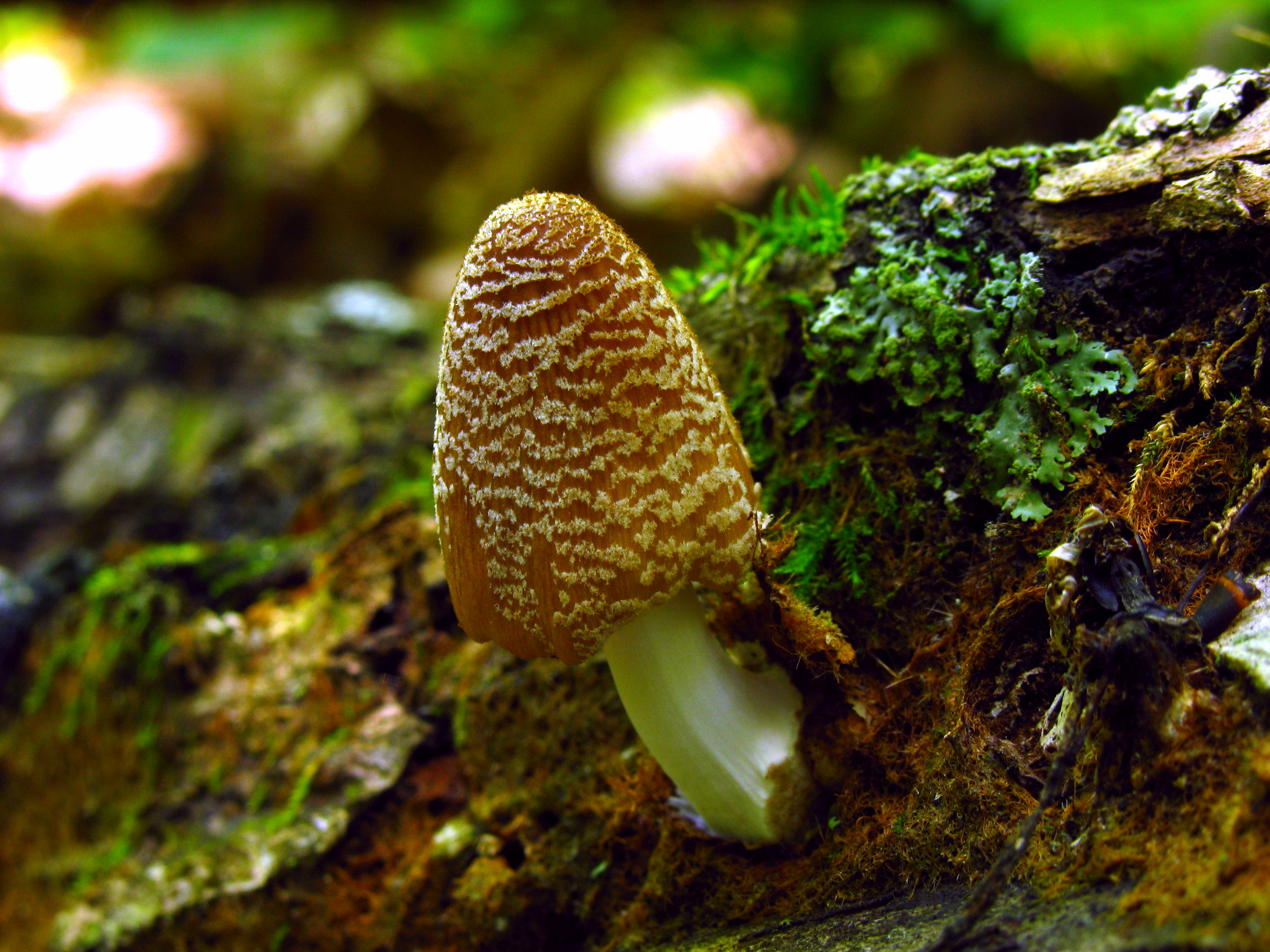

Scientific classification
- Kingdom: Fungi
- Division: Basidiomycota
- Class: Agaricomycetes
- Order: Agaricales
- Family: Psathyrellaceae
- Genus: Coprinellus
- Species: C. domesticus

Binomial name
- Coprinellus domesticus (Bolton) Vilgalys, Hopple & Jacq.Johnson (2001)

Synonyms
- Agaricus domesticus Bolton (1788); Coprinus domesticus (Bolton) Gray (1821)

= Coprinellus domesticus =

Species of fungus

Coprinellus domesticus
- Mycological characteristics
- Gills on hymenium
- Cap is ovate or campanulate
- Hymenium is adnexed or free
- Stipe is bare or has a ring
- Spore print is black
- Ecology is saprotrophic
- Edibility is not recommended

Coprinellus domesticus, commonly known as the domestic inky cap, or firerug inkcap, is a species of mushroom in the family Psathyrellaceae.

== Taxonomy ==
First described as Agaricus domesticus by James Bolton in 1788, it was later known as Coprinus domesticus before it was transferred to the genus Coprinellus in 2001.

== Description ==
The cap is yellowish, thin and grooved, grows up to 5 centimetres (2 in) tall prior in a shape resembling a closed umbrella before expanding to nearly flat. The gills are adnexed, close, and whitish before darkening. The stem is up to 10 cm (4 in) long and 8 millimetres (3/8 in) wide. The spore print is black.

The firerug inkcap gets its name from the bright orange carpet of hyphae grown around the mushroom. The covering is known as an ozonium, which resembles an aboveground mycelium. The ozonium is not always present and can also grow in the absence of any mushrooms.

Spores are 6-9 x 3.5-5 µm, elliptical, smooth, with an eccentric pore. Basidia are 4-spored; surrounded by 4-6 brachybasidia. Pleurocystidia are subglobose to subcylindric; up to 120 x 65 µm. Cheilocystidia variously shaped; up to 100 x 60 µm.

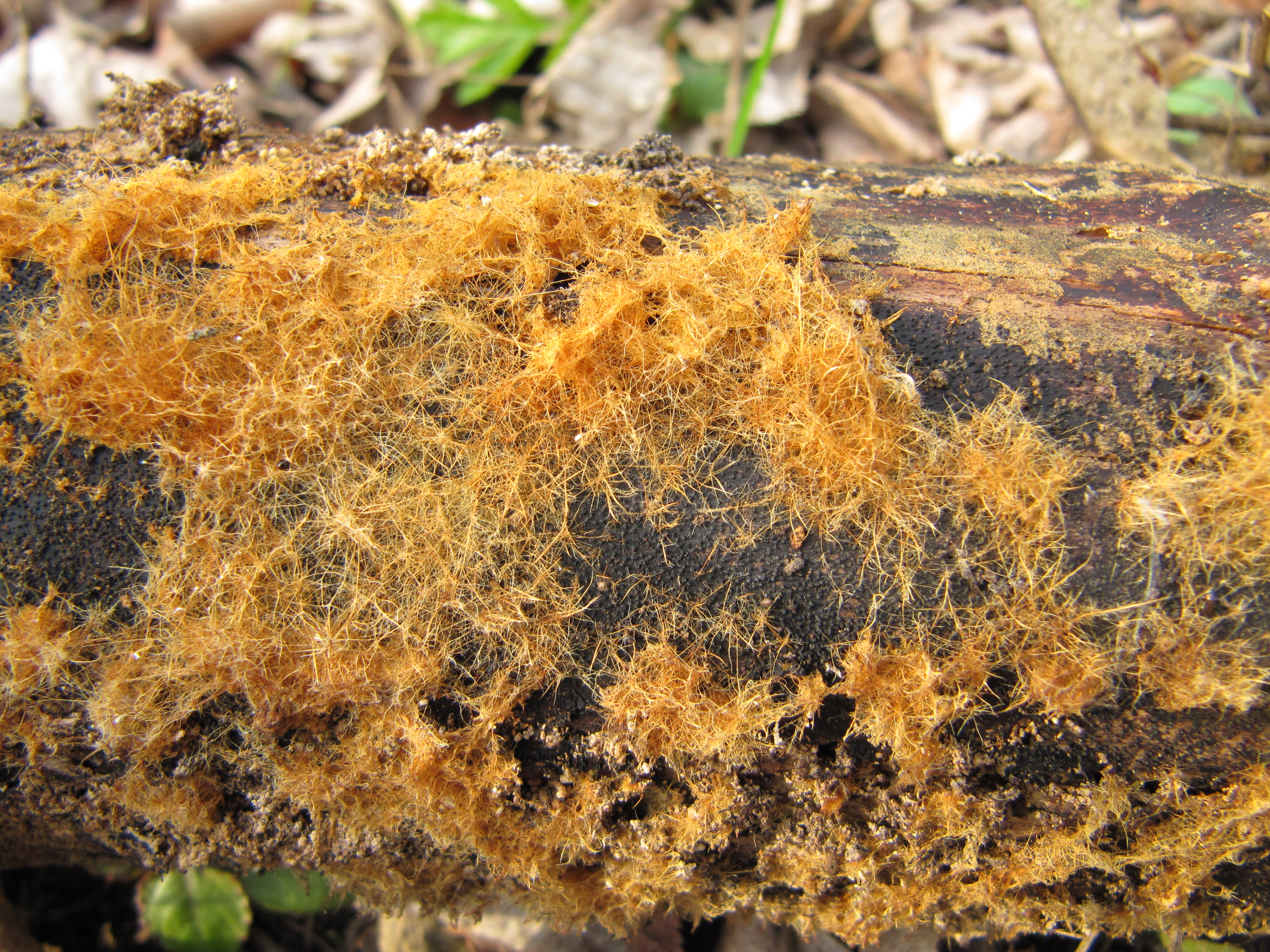
The bright orange ozonium

=== Similar species ===
Coprinellus radians is identical in every aspect except for its larger spore size. These are the only two species that are known to form this ozonium.

Microscopy may be required to distinguish related species in the group.

== Habitat and distribution ==
It is present worldwide. It grows on hardwood stumps, logs, and debris in North America from May to September in the East and November to April near the West Coast.

== Uses ==
Although it is difficult to identify, it has been said to be edible.
