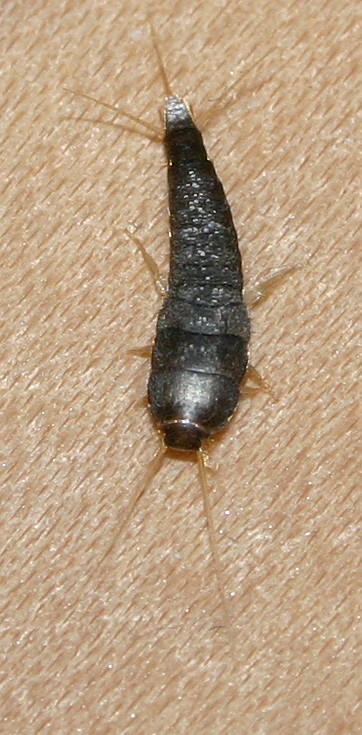
- Silverfish

Scientific classification
- Kingdom: Animalia
- Phylum: Arthropoda
- Class: Insecta
- Order: Zygentoma
- Family: Lepismatidae; Latreille, 1802

Subfamilies
- Acrotelsatinae Mendes, 1991; Ctenolepismatinae Mendes, 1991; Heterolepismatinae Mendes, 1991; Lepismatinae Latreille, 1802; Mirolepismatinae Mendes, 1991; Silvestrellatinae Mendes, 1991

= Lepismatidae =

Lepismatidae Temporal range: Aptian–Recent

Family of silverfishes

Lepismatidae is a family of primitive wingless insects with about 340 described species. This family contains the two most familiar members of the order Zygentoma: the silverfish (Lepisma saccharinum) and the firebrat (Thermobia domestica). It is one of five families in the order Zygentoma.

Lepismatids are elongated, flattened insects, the majority of which are scavengers. The abdomen is usually clothed in tiny scales and terminates with three "tails" of roughly equal length. The compound eyes are small and well separated.

They typically live in warm, damp environments, including indoors. They avoid light.

== Genera ==
These subfamilies and genera belong to the family Lepismatidae:

- Acrotelsinae Mendes, 1991
  - Acrotelsa Escherich, 1905
  - Anisolepisma Paclt, 1967
  - Desertinoma Kaplin, 1992
  - Lepismina Gervais, 1844
  - Paracrotelsa Paclt, 1967
  - Primacrotelsa Mendes, 2004
- Ctenolepismatinae Mendes, 1991
  - Acrotelsella Silvestri, 1935
  - Asiolepisma Kaplin, 1989
  - Caribesella Molero-Baltanás, Gaju-Ricart, & Smith, 2024
  - Ctenolepisma Escherich, 1905
  - Gopsilepisma Irish, 1990
  - Hyperlepisma Silvestri, 1932
  - Leucolepisma Wall, 1954
  - Monachina Silvestri, 1908
  - Mormisma Silvestri, 1938
  - Namibmormisma Irish, 1989
  - Nebkhalepisma Irish, 1989
  - Ornatilepisma Irish, 1989
  - Psammolepisma Irish, 1989
  - Sabulepisma Irish, 1989
  - Sceletolepisma Wygodzinsky, 1955
  - Stylifera Stach, 1932
  - Swalepisma Irish, 1989
  - Thermobia Bergroth, 1890
- Heterolepismatinae Mendes, 1991
  - Heterolepisma Escherich, 1905
  - Maritisma Smith & Mitchell, 2019
  - Visma Smith, Mitchell, & Molero-Batanás, 2021
- Lepismatinae Latreille, 1802
  - Afrolepisma Mendes, 1981
  - Allacrotelsa Silvestri, 1935
  - Anallacrotelsa Mendes, 1996
  - Lepisma Linnaeus, 1758
  - Lepitrochisma Mendes, 1988
  - Neoasterolepisma Mendes, 1988
  - Tricholepisma Paclt, 1967
  - Xenolepisma Mendes, 1981
- Mirolepismatinae Mendes, 1901
  - Mirolepisma Silvestri, 1938
  - Prolepismina Silvestri, 1940
- Silvestrellinae Mendes, 1991
  - Hemikulina Mendes, 2008
  - Hemilepisma Paclt, 1967
  - Namunukulina Wygodzinsky, 1957
  - Silvestrella Escherich, 1905
- incertae sedis
  - Apteryskenoma Paclt, 1952
  - Panlepisma Silvestri, 1940

There are several genera known only from fossils:

- † Burmalepisma Mendes & Poinar, 2008 Burmese amber, Myanmar, Cenomanian
- † Cretalepisma Mendes & Wunderlich, 2013 Burmese amber, Myanmar, Cenomanian
- † Onycholepisma Pierce, 1951
- † Protolepisma Mendes & Poinar, 2013 Dominican amber, Miocene

== Parasites ==
Member of the Strepsiptera family Mengenillinidae exclusively parasitise members of Lepismatidae. Host-species relationships include: Eoxenos laboulbenei on Tricholepisma aureum, Neoasterolepisma wasmanni and N. palmonii; Mengenilla parvula on Sceletolepisma michaelseni; Mengenilla nigritula on Ctenolepisma ciliatum and Ctenolepisma sp.; Mengenilla laevigata, M. quasita, M. spinulosa and M. subnigrescens on C. lineatum; and an unidentified species of Strepsiptera on Mormisma peyerimhoffi.

Parasitic Apicomplexa are often found in the intestinal tract, especially the crop, of Lepismatidae. Ctenolepisma lineatum contains on average 15 parasite specimens per animal. Several species of gregarine parasites have been recorded from the intestinal tract of the gray silverfish:

Lepismatidae species	gregarine parasites
Acrotelsa collaris	Colepismatophila watsonae, Garnhamia aciculata, Lepismatophila thermobiae
Ctenolepisma calvum	Colepismatophila burti, Garnhamia aciculata, Lepismatophila orientalis
Ctenolepisma lineatum	Lepismatophila parva, Lepismatophila ctenolepismae
Ctenolepisma longicaudatum	Garnhamia aciculata, Lepismatophila ctenolepismae
Ctenolepisma nigrum	Colepismatophila buckleyi, Lepismatophila orientalis
Ctenolepisma sp.	Garnhamia aciculata, Lepismatophila cornwalli
Lepisma saccharinum	Gregarina lagenoides, Lepismatophila thermobiae, unidentified Colepismatophila species and Gregarinidae species
Thermobia domestica	Colepismatophila watsonae, Lepismatophila thermobiae and an unidentified Gregarinidae species
