= Giant mealworm =

Giant mealworm can refer to:

- Tenebrio molitor larvae which have been grown to a large size by being hormonally treated to delay pupation
- Zophobas morio larvae which naturally grow to a large size. However, the Superworm is not defined as a mealworm in any fashion.
