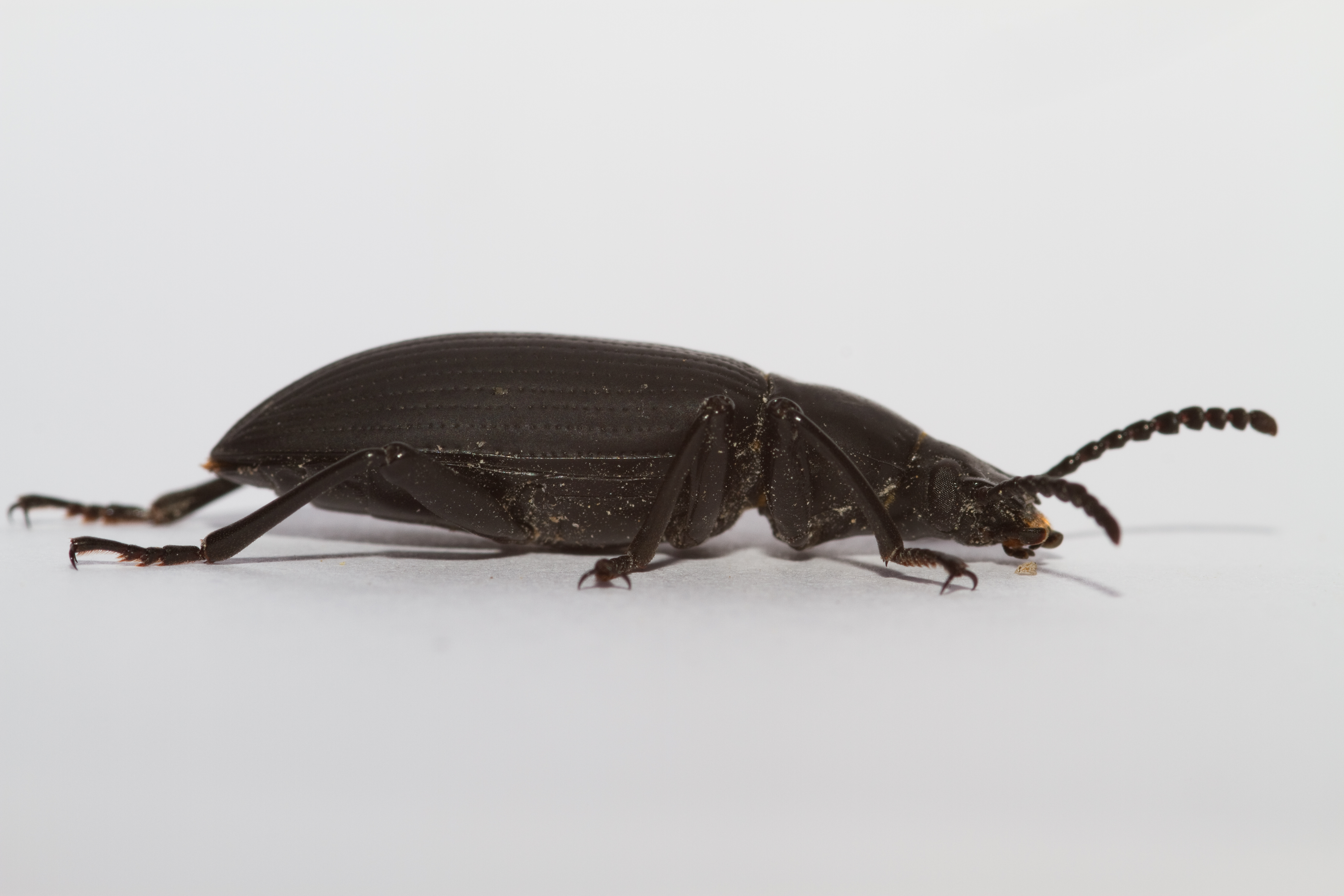
- Zophobas atratus

Scientific classification
- Kingdom: Animalia
- Phylum: Arthropoda
- Clade: Pancrustacea
- Class: Insecta
- Order: Coleoptera
- Suborder: Polyphaga
- Infraorder: Cucujiformia
- Family: Tenebrionidae
- Tribe: Tenebrionini
- Genus: Zophobas; Blanchard, 1845

Species
- See text

= Zophobas =

Genus of beetles

Zophobas is a genus of beetles in the family Tenebrionidae, the darkling beetles. They occur in the Americas, from the Neotropics into southernmost United States. In Cuba beetles of this genus are known as blind click-beetles.

Perhaps the best known species is Zophobas morio, synonymously known as Zophobas atratus, a beetle whose larvae are robust mealworms sold as food for pets such as lizards. The larvae are known commonly as "superworms". Superworms should not be confused with darkling beetle mealworms sprayed with juvenile hormone. Studies have found that in the wild the larvae sometimes live in bat guano, and they tend to cannibalize the pupae of their own species. Researchers have discovered that the larvae can subsist on a diet solely of polystyrene (Styrofoam).

== Species ==
The following species are assigned to this genus:

- Zophobas atratus (Fabricius, 1775)
- Zophobas costatus Pic, 1921
- Zophobas diversicolor Pic, 1921
- Zophobas erosicollis Kraatz, 1880
- Zophobas klingelhoefferi Kraatz, 1880
- Zophobas macretus Kraatz, 1880
- Zophobas maculicollis Kirsch, 1866
- Zophobas opacus (Sahlberg, 1823)
- Zophobas quadrinotatus Kraatz, 1880
- Zophobas quadripustulatus Fabricius, 1801
- Zophobas signatus Champion, 1885
- Zophobas tridentatus Kraatz, 1880
