= Ssp1a =

Spider ion channel toxin

Identifiers
3D model (JSmol)	Interactive image
- InChI: InChI=1S/C176H235N47O48S6/c1-86(2)55-111(146(183)242)202-163(259)123(69-143(238)239)210-154(250)115(59-91-38-44-98(226)45-39-91)204-151(247)109(33-20-52-187-176(184)185)200-166(262)129-81-274-276-83-131-170(266)219-130-82-275-273-80-128(216-147(243)103(179)65-142(236)237)168(264)203-112(56-87(3)4)149(245)192-76-139(232)196-116(61-93-71-188-104-28-13-10-25-100(93)104)156(252)205-114(57-89-23-8-7-9-24-89)155(251)215-126(78-224)150(246)193-77-140(233)197-127(165(261)214-125(70-144(240)241)175(271)223-54-22-35-134(223)172(268)212-122(68-137(182)230)162(258)209-121(67-136(181)229)161(257)208-120(66-135(180)228)160(256)199-108(153(249)217-131)32-17-19-51-178)79-272-277-84-132(220-173(269)145(88(5)6)221-164(260)113(58-90-36-42-97(225)43-37-90)195-138(231)75-191-148(244)110(201-167(130)263)48-49-141(234)235)169(265)207-119(64-96-74-186-85-194-96)159(255)206-117(62-94-72-189-105-29-14-11-26-101(94)105)157(253)198-107(31-16-18-50-177)152(248)213-124(60-92-40-46-99(227)47-41-92)174(270)222-53-21-34-133(222)171(267)211-118(158(254)218-129)63-95-73-190-106-30-15-12-27-102(95)106/h7-15,23-30,36-47,71-74,85-88,103,107-134,145,188-190,224-227H,16-22,31-35,48-70,75-84,177-179H2,1-6H3,(H2,180,228)(H2,181,229)(H2,182,230)(H2,183,242)(H,186,194)(H,191,244)(H,192,245)(H,193,246)(H,195,231)(H,196,232)(H,197,233)(H,198,253)(H,199,256)(H,200,262)(H,201,263)(H,202,259)(H,203,264)(H,204,247)(H,205,252)(H,206,255)(H,207,265)(H,208,257)(H,209,258)(H,210,250)(H,211,267)(H,212,268)(H,213,248)(H,214,261)(H,215,251)(H,216,243)(H,217,249)(H,218,254)(H,219,266)(H,220,269)(H,221,260)(H,234,235)(H,236,237)(H,238,239)(H,240,241)(H4,184,185,187)/t103-,107-,108-,109-,110-,111-,112-,113-,114-,115-,116-,117-,118-,119-,120-,121-,122-,123-,124-,125-,126-,127-,128-,129-,130-,131-,132-,133-,134-,145-/m0/s1 Key: KDPWIKNQWJZDTM-SNNVQBLVSA-N
- SMILES: N[C@@]([H])(CC(=O)O)C(=O)N[C@@]([H])(CS3)C(=O)N[C@@]([H])(CC(C)C)C(=O)NCC(=O)N[C@@]([H])(CC(=CN2)C1=C2C=CC=C1)C(=O)N[C@@]([H])(Cc1ccccc1)C(=O)N[C@@]([H])(CO)C(=O)NCC(=O)N[C@@]([H])(CS4)C(=O)N[C@@]([H])(CC(=O)O)C(=O)N1[C@@]([H])(CCC1)C(=O)N[C@@]([H])(CC(=O)N)C(=O)N[C@@]([H])(CC(=O)N)C(=O)N[C@@]([H])(CC(=O)N)C(=O)N[C@@]([H])(CCCCN)C(=O)N[C@@]([H])(CS5)C(=O)N[C@@]([H])(CS3)C(=O)N[C@@]([H])(CCC(=O)O)C(=O)NCC(=O)N[C@@]([H])(Cc1ccc(O)cc1)C(=O)N[C@@]([H])(C(C)C)C(=O)N[C@@]([H])(CS4)C(=O)N[C@@]([H])(CC1=CN=C-N1)C(=O)N[C@@]([H])(CC(=CN2)C1=C2C=CC=C1)C(=O)N[C@@]([H])(CCCCN)C(=O)N[C@@]([H])(Cc1ccc(O)cc1)C(=O)N1[C@@]([H])(CCC1)C(=O)N[C@@]([H])(CC(=CN2)C1=C2C=CC=C1)C(=O)N[C@@]([H])(CS5)C(=O)N[C@@]([H])(CCCNC(=N)N)C(=O)N[C@@]([H])(Cc1ccc(O)cc1)C(=O)N[C@@]([H])(CC(=O)O)C(=O)N[C@@]([H])(CC(C)C)C(=O)N
- Except where otherwise noted, data are given for materials in their standard state (at 25 °C [77 °F], 100 kPa). Infobox references

Ssp1a is a peptide toxin produced by the spider Selenotypus which selectively targets the voltage-sensing domains (VSDs) II of voltage-gated sodium (Na_{V}) channels, with a particular high potency against human pain Na_{V}1.7 channels.

== Etymology and source ==
Ssp1a was isolated and discovered in 2021 from the venom of the Selenotypus genus through assay-guided fractionation. Within the Theraphosidae family, this taxonomic group includes one of the largest tarantulas that inhabit Australia, S. plumipes. As Theraphosidae is poorly classified, this particular species remains the only one formally established within the Selenotypus genus.

== Chemistry ==
=== Family and homology ===
Ssp1a belongs to the Sodium Channel Spider Toxin 1 (NaSpTx1) family of venom peptides that directly target Na_{V} channels. This peptide toxin was classified based on homology with other toxins in NaSpTx1, namely GpTx-1 and HwTx-IV, which were found to share a C-terminal tail.

=== Structure ===
Ssp1a is a 33-residue inhibitor cystine knot (ICK) peptide toxin, which displays a typical structural motif present in arachnid toxins, with six cysteine residues that form three disulfide connectivity bridges (Cys1-Cys4, Cys2-Cys5, Cys3-Cys6). Nuclear magnetic resonance (NMR) analysis of recombinant Ssp1a (rSsp1a) also revealed that rSsp1a consists of an amphiphilic surface that presents both hydrophobic and hydrophilic patches. This surface was found to play a key role in binding to VSDs. The hydrophilic core patch incorporates three residues His23, Lys25 and Arg30, interacting closely with the adjacent hydrophobic cluster composed of six amino acid units: Trp5, Phe6, Tyr20, Tyr26, Tyr31 and Trp28. The amino acid sequence of Ssp1a is: DCLGW FSGCD PNNNK CCEGY VCHWK YPWCR YDL (Asp-Cys-Leu-Gly-Trp-Phe-Ser-Gly-Cys-Asp-Pro-Asn-Asn-Asn-Lys-Cys-Cys-Glu-Gly-Tyr-Val-Cys-His-Trp-Lys-Tyr-Pro-Trp-Cys-Arg-Tyr-Asp-Leu).

== Target ==
Ssp1a is a peptide that inhibits Na_{v} channels. This peptide has the highest potency against Na_{v}1.7 channels. A study found that human Na_{v}1.7 channels were inhibited at concentrations as low as 2.5 ng/ml. Its inhibitory potency against sodium channel subtypes followed the order Na_{v}1.7 > Na_{v}1.6 > Na_{v}1.2 > Na_{v}1.3 > Na_{v}1.1. At higher concentration levels of the peptide, it also starts affecting other sodium channels. Approximately 60% of the Na_{v}1.5 current was blocked at a concentration of 3 μM. Weak interactions were also found for channel Na_{v}1.8 and Na_{v}1.4 at concentrations of 3 μM and 9 μM.

== Mode of action ==
Ssp1a acts as a gating modifier of voltage-gated sodium channels by interacting with their voltage-sensing domains (VSDs). The peptide primarily targets VSD II, which is associated with channel activation. Ssp1a inhibits the channel activity at common depolarizing potentials, while action potentials still occur at extremely high depolarizing potentials. Ssp1a inserts itself into the aqueous cleft between the S1-S2 and S3-S4 loops of VSD II. This interaction restricts the upward movement of the S4 transmembrane segment, thus trapping the channel in the resting state. Following a 30-minute washout, inhibition was partially reversed, with approximately 25% of Na_{v}1.2, 50% of Na_{v}1.3, and 40% of Na_{v}1.7 channels recovering.

== Toxicity ==
While spider venom of the family Theraphosidae is not lethal to humans, a bite might induce local inflammatory symptoms such as pain and swelling. Information on toxic effects in animals is limited, but research has demonstrated that spider bites of the Theraphosidae family can be fatal in dogs within thirty minutes of arachnidism.
