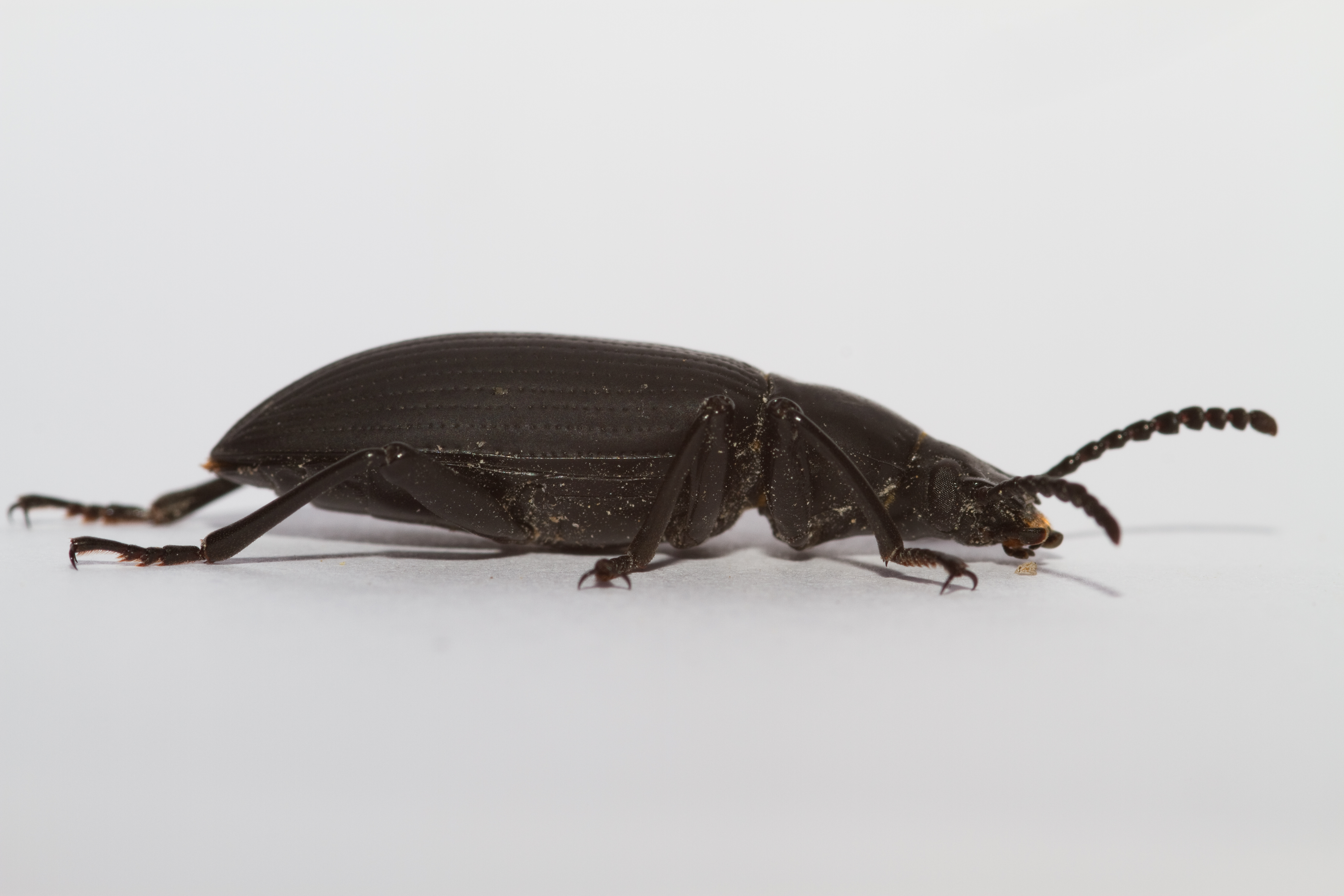

Scientific classification
- Kingdom: Animalia
- Phylum: Arthropoda
- Clade: Pancrustacea
- Class: Insecta
- Order: Coleoptera
- Suborder: Polyphaga
- Infraorder: Cucujiformia
- Family: Tenebrionidae
- Genus: Zophobas
- Species: Z. atratus

Binomial name
- Zophobas atratus (Fabricius, 1775)

Synonyms
- Helops morio Fabricius, 1777; Tenebrio atratus Fabricius, 1775; Zophobas morio (Fabricius, 1776); Zophobas rugipes Kirsch, 1886

= Zophobas atratus =

Species of beetle

Zophobas atratus, the giant mealworm beetle, is a species of darkling beetle, whose larvae are known by the common name superworm, kingworm, barley worm, and morio worm. Superworms are common in the reptile pet industry as food, along with giant mealworms (Tenebrio molitor larvae treated with juvenile hormone).

The larvae resemble very large mealworms, about 50 to 60 mm (2.0 to 2.4 in) long when full size, but unlike mealworms, the ends of their bodies are very dark, almost black. Once they reach sufficient maturity, the larvae go stiff and still in a "C" shape to pupate. They emerge 1-3 weeks later as an adult beetle with a white to light brown colour; eventually darkening to black. Pupation is commonly delayed by keeping larvae in high density with other larvae and plentiful food, and can be resumed by isolating larvae for 7–10 days. They will then pupate and, upon maturation, emerge as darkling beetles.

Zophobas atratus is generally accepted by captive lizards, turtles, frogs, salamanders, birds, koi and other insectivorous animals. Their nutritional values are similar to those of mealworms, so it is possible that supplementation with calcium is necessary if they are used as a staple food item. In some cases they are preferred over mealworms due to their softer exoskeleton, making them more digestible to some reptiles. The larvae are odor-free, but the adult beetles possess a pungent chemical defense that may be released when provoked. Zophobas atratus can easily be contained, making them ideal for breeding to feed a collection of captive insectivores. The nutritional profile of the larvae is "46.80% proteins, 43.64% lipids, 8.17% ashes and 1.39% carbohydrates."

== Distribution ==
This beetle occurs naturally in tropical regions of Central and South America, but has spread across the world for use as food for reptiles and other insectivorous pets.

== Taxonomy ==
The name Zophobas morio is still very widely in use in the scientific literature, although it has been synonymised with Z. atratus. Since Z. morio was published later (in the year 1777) than Z. atratus (published in 1775), the former name is a junior subjective synonym of the latter, and Z. atratus is the valid name of this species.

== Relationship with humans ==
=== As pet feed ===
As with the popular mealworm, Z. atratus larvae (commonly known as superworms, and under the name Zophobas morio) are widely used in pet care, more specifically as feed.

Superworms are relatively high in protein and fat, which make them attractive pet feed for captive reptiles, amphibians, fish, and birds, and other types of insectivores like ants. Their ability to stay alive without eating for 1–2 weeks makes the keeping process highly feasible for bulk commercial availability around the world. However, pet owners are advised to keep them in warm temperatures as, unlike the mealworm, superworms do not enter the process of hibernation. They are also known to bite and agitate when threatened by handling, although the bite is not very painful.

=== As waste disposal agents ===
Larvae of Zophobas atratus, Tenebrio molitor and Tenebrio obscurus all have been found to consume expanded polystyrene foam; they are examples of plastivores. Zophobas atratus breaks down polystyrene through a two-stage process: first by mechanically shredding the plastic into smaller pieces through chewing, which exposes pieces to oxygen atoms, and then by using bacterial gut enzymes to depolymerize the pieces. Zophobas atratus larvae fed with a polystyrene diet were more active and managed to gain a slight amount of weight compared to the same type of larvae on a starvation diet.

== See also ==
- Entomophagy

== Gallery ==
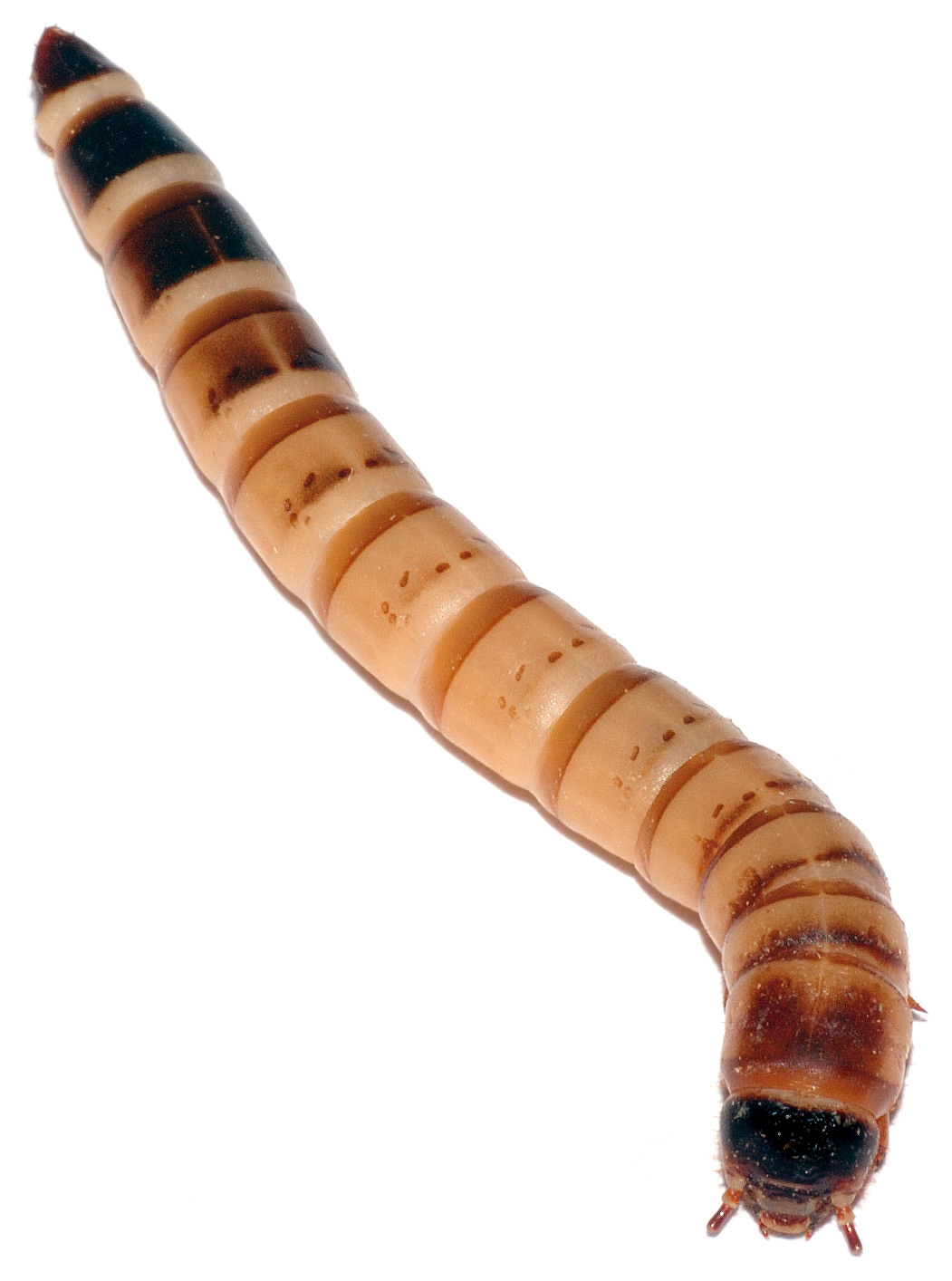
Larva

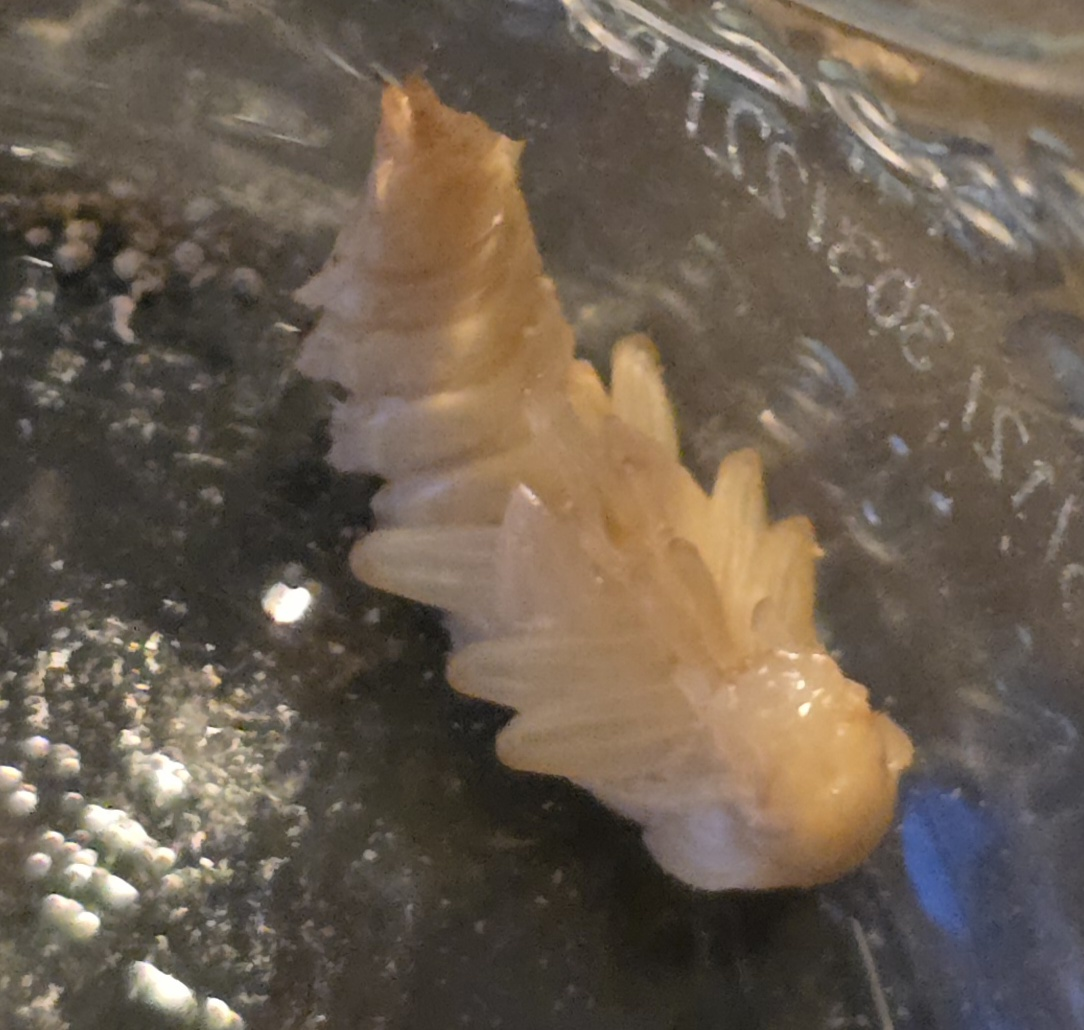
Newly formed pupa

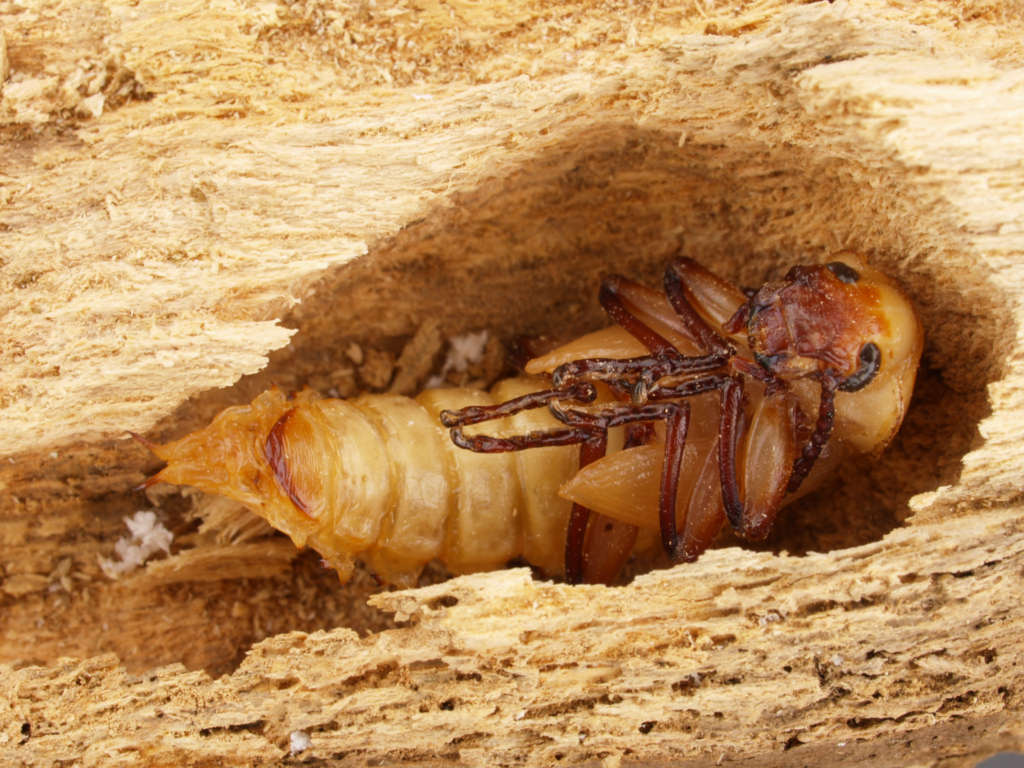
Pupa close to eclosion

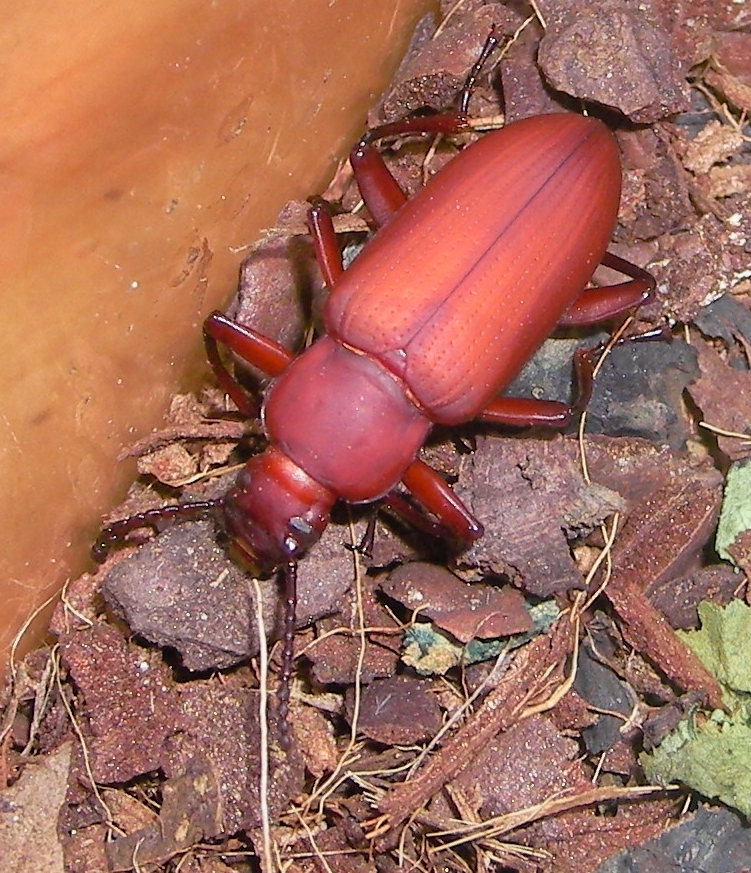
Teneral male beetle

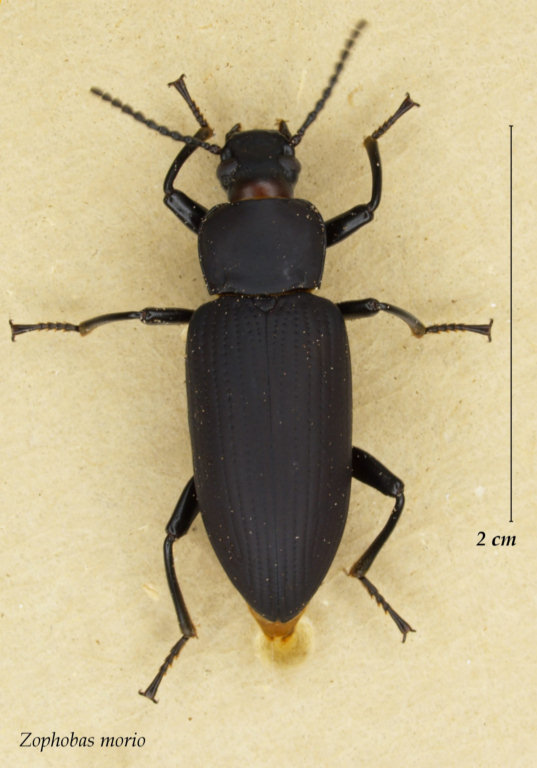
Female pinned adult specimen

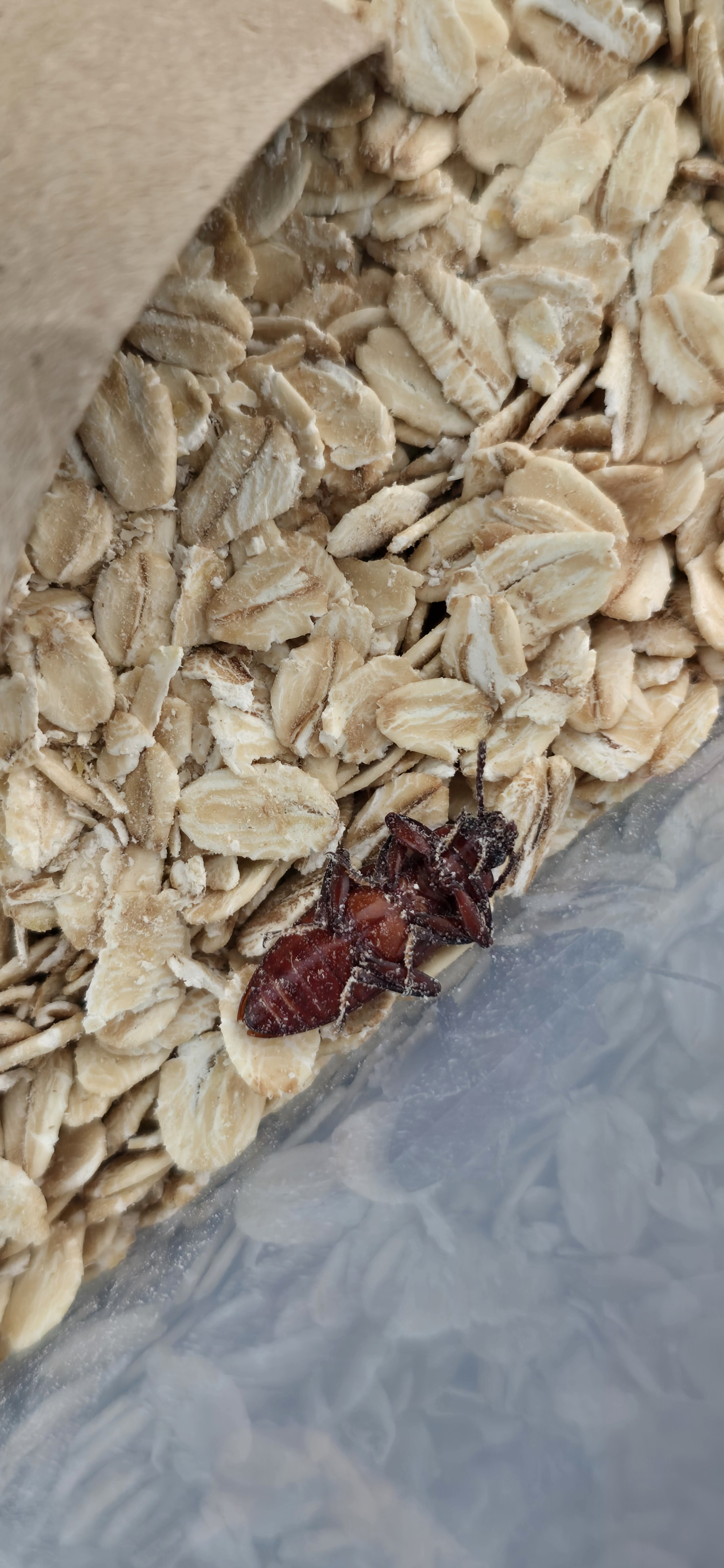
Teneral male adult in thanatosis
