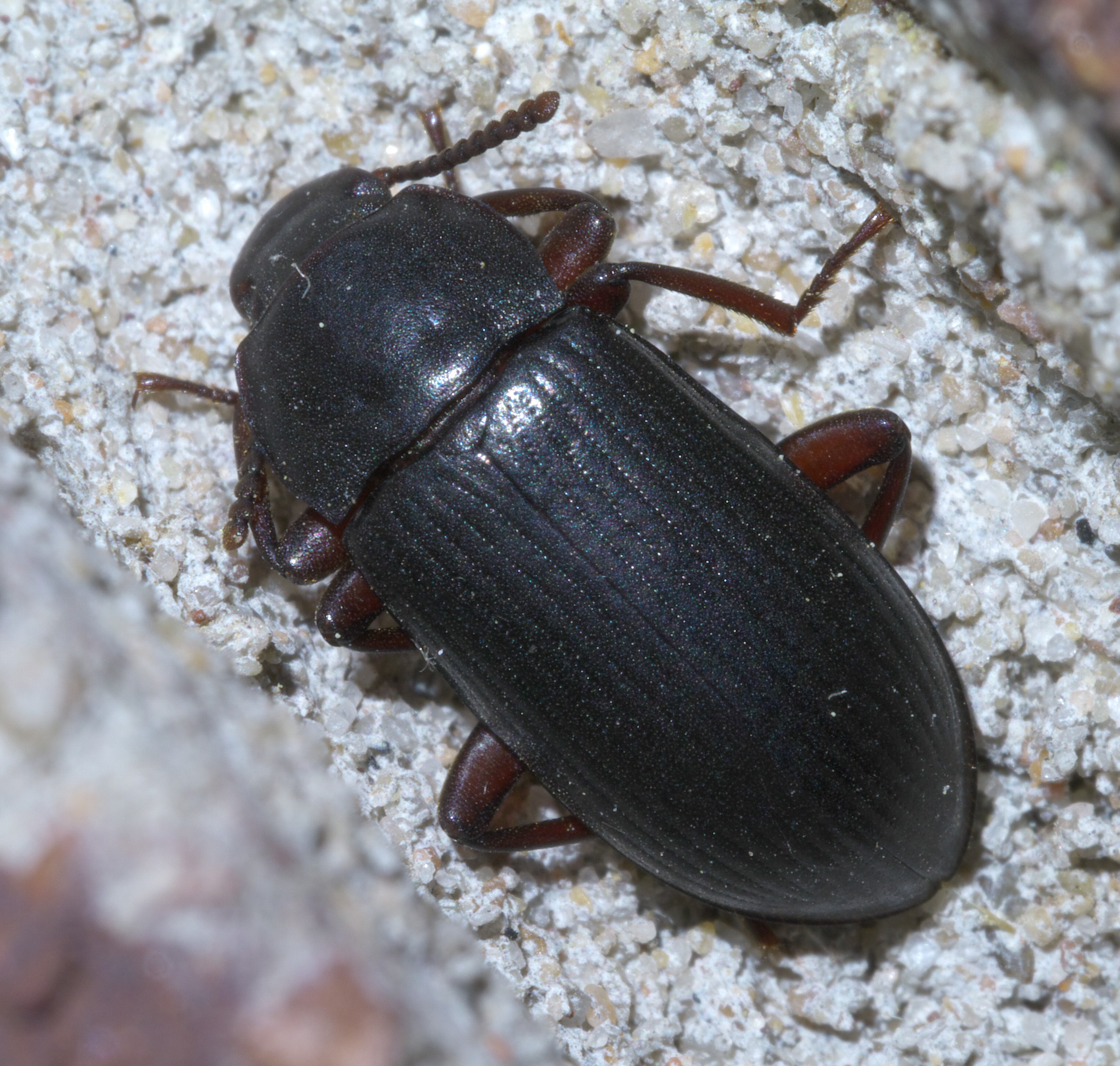
- Neatus tenebrioides

Scientific classification
- Kingdom: Animalia
- Phylum: Arthropoda
- Clade: Pancrustacea
- Class: Insecta
- Order: Coleoptera
- Suborder: Polyphaga
- Infraorder: Cucujiformia
- Family: Tenebrionidae
- Subfamily: Tenebrioninae
- Tribe: Tenebrionini; Latreille, 1802

= Tenebrionini =

Tribe of beetles

Tenebrionini is a tribe of darkling beetles in the family Tenebrionidae. There are at least 20 genera in Tenebrionini.

== Genera ==
These genera belong to the tribe Tenebrionini:

- Ariarathus Fairmaire, 1891 (the Palearctic and Indomalaya)
- Athrodactyla Klug, 1833 (tropical Africa)
- Bius Dejean, 1834 (North America and the Palearctic)
- Bouchardandrus Steiner, 2016 (North America)
- Bremerus Ferrer, 2004 (tropical Africa)
- Cedrosius Fairmaire, 1902 (tropical Africa)
- Falsocalcar Pic, 1925 (tropical Africa)
- Gridellia Kammerer, 2006 (tropical Africa)
- Hipalmus Bates, 1870 (the Neotropics)
- Idiobates Casey, 1892 (North America)
- Microzophobas Pic, 1944 (the Neotropics)
- Neatus Leconte, 1862 (North America and the Palearctic)
- Neozophobas Ferrer, 2006 (the Neotropics)
- Paratoxicum Champion, 1894 (Australasia)
- Phanerops Solier, 1851 (the Neotropics)
- Rhinandrus Leconte, 1866 (North America and the Neotropics)
- Satanocalcar Pic, 1925 (tropical Africa)
- Tenebrio Linnaeus, 1758 (mealworm beetles) (North America, the Palearctic, Indomalaya, Australasia, and Oceania)
- Trichotenebrio Ardoin, 1962 (tropical Africa)
- Zophobas Dejean, 1834 (North America, the Neotropics, and tropical Africa)
