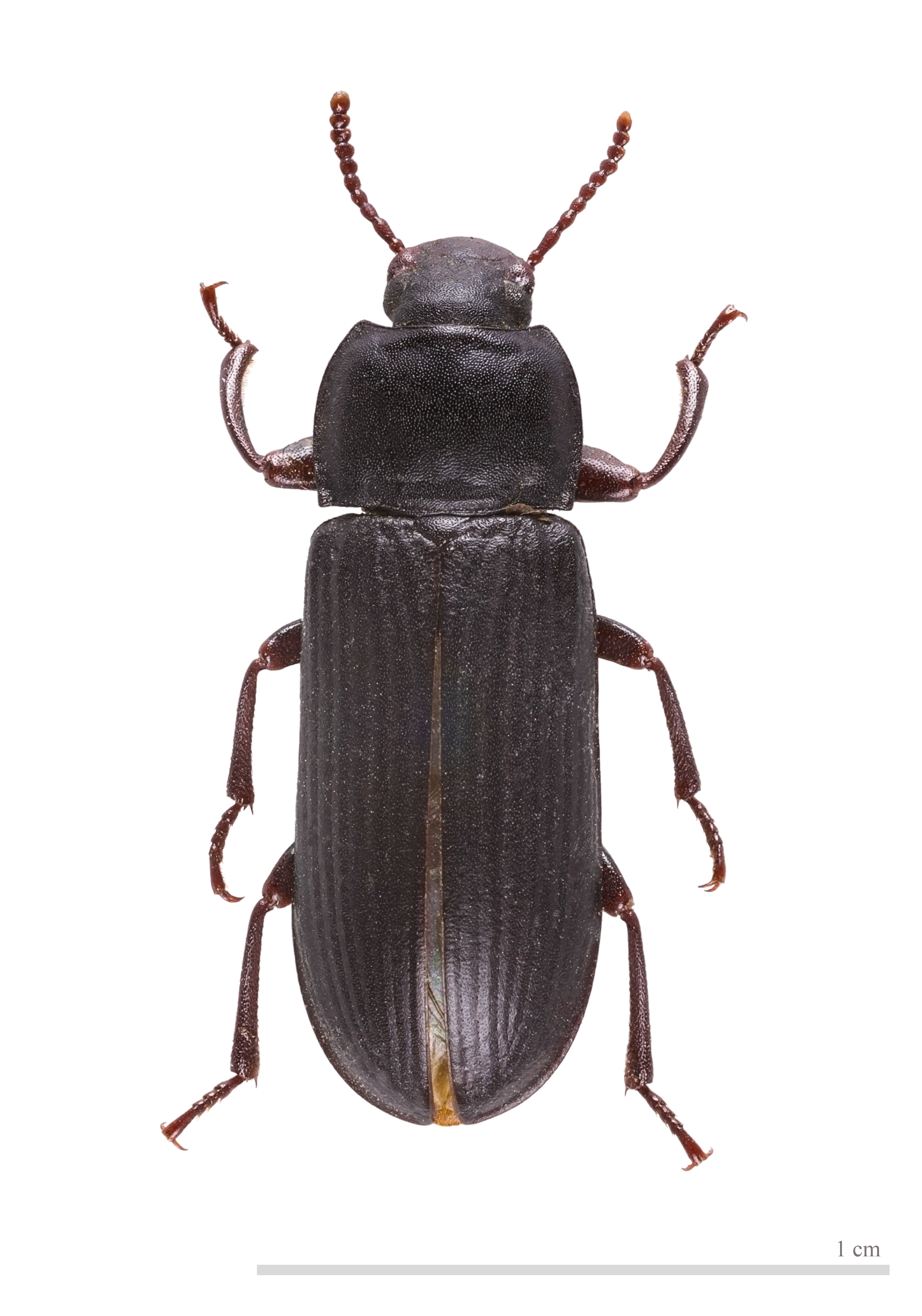
- Tenebrio molitor adult

Scientific classification
- Kingdom: Animalia
- Phylum: Arthropoda
- Class: Insecta
- Order: Coleoptera
- Suborder: Polyphaga
- Infraorder: Cucujiformia
- Family: Tenebrionidae
- Subfamily: Tenebrioninae
- Tribe: Tenebrionini
- Genus: Tenebrio; Linnaeus, 1758

Species
- See text

= Tenebrio =

Tenebrio Temporal range: 51 to 0 million years ago Ypresian - Recent

Genus of beetles

Tenebrio is a genus of darkling beetles. Adults are 12–18 mm (0.47–0.71 in) long and can live for 1–2 years. The larvae are minor pests, but they are also widely reared and sold as pet food.

== Species ==
The genus contains the following extant species:

- Tenebrio culinaris Linnaeus, 1758
- Tenebrio guineensis Imhoff, 1843
- Tenebrio giganteus (Gmelin, 1790)
- Tenebrio grandicollis (Fairmaire, 1897)
- Tenebrio molitor Linnaeus, 1758 – yellow mealworm
- Tenebrio obscurus Fabricius, 1792 – dark mealworm
- Tenebrio opacus Duftschmid, 1812
- Tenebrio patrizii Gridelli, 1958
- Tenebrio punctipennis Seidlitz, 1896
- Tenebrio zairensis Ferrer, 1998

Four species are known from fossils found in Germany and Canada:

- Tenebrio calculensis Scudder, 1895 - (Pleistocene, Leda Clay, Canada)
- Tenebrio effossus Germar, 1837 - (Oligocene, Rott Formation, Germany)
- Tenebrio primigenius Scudder, 1879 - (Ypresian, Allenby Formation, Canada)
- Tenebrio senex Von Heyden, 1859 - (Oligocene, Rott Formation, Germany)

== Gallery ==
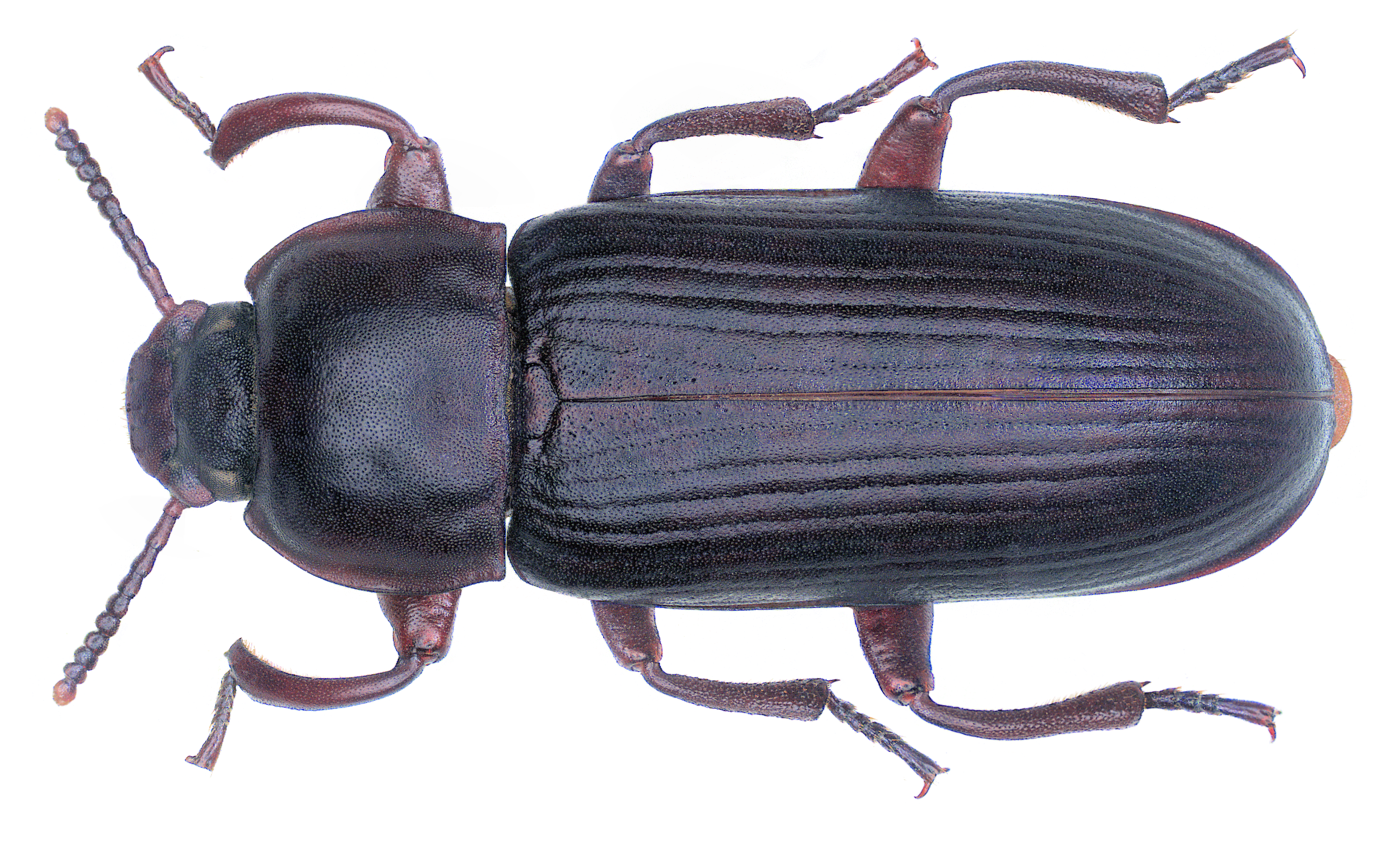
Tenebrio molitor

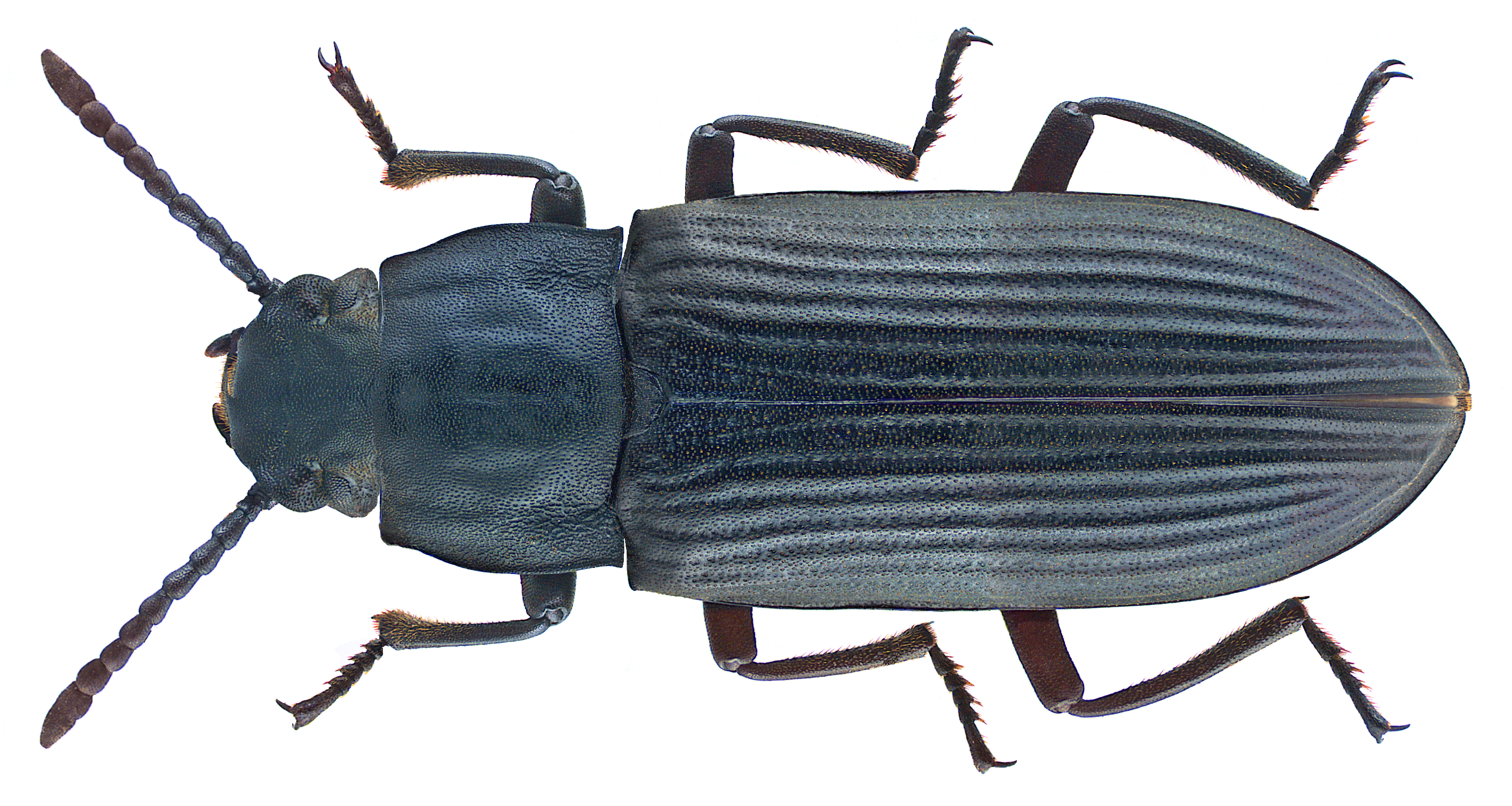
Tenebrio giganteus

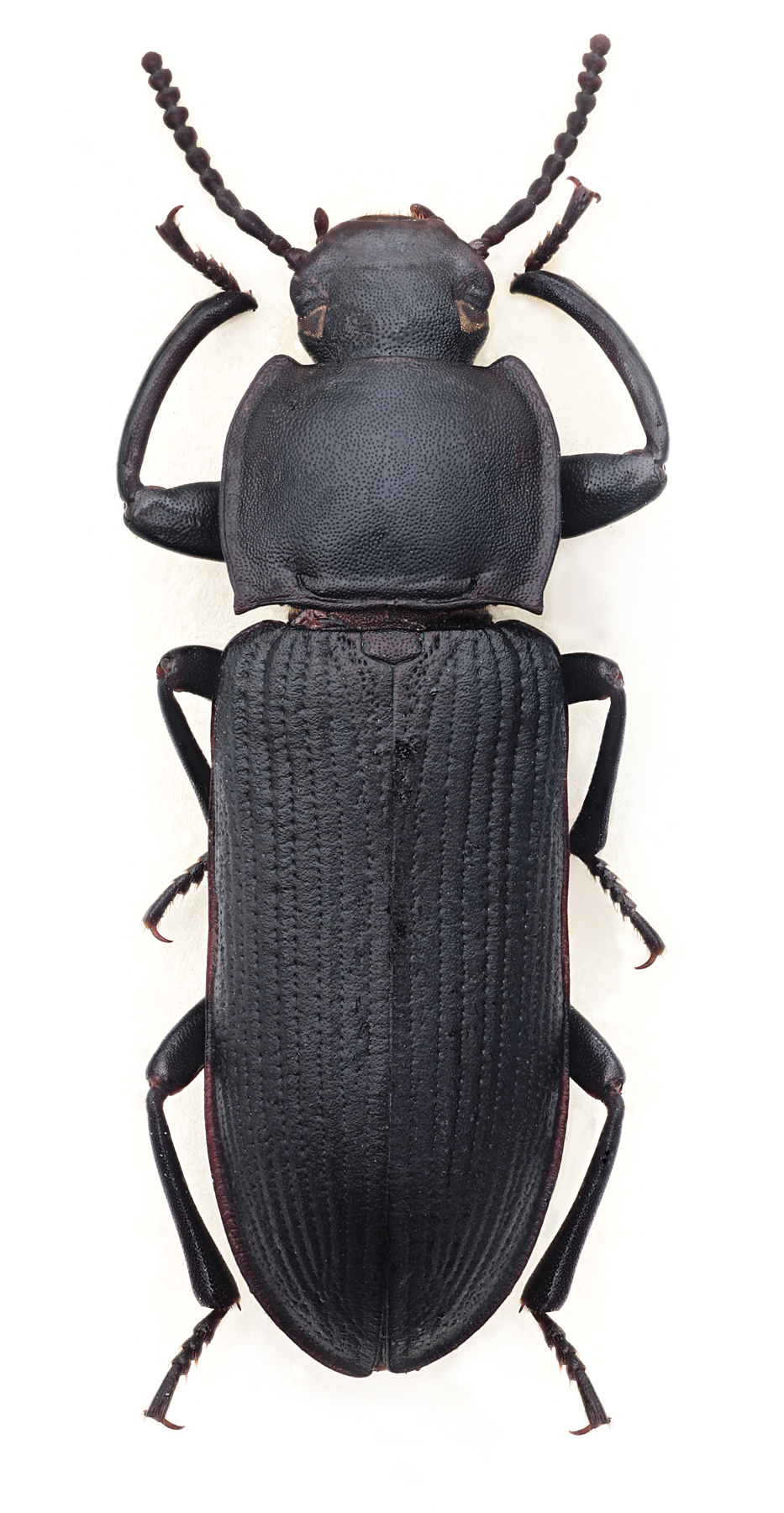
Tenebrio opacus
