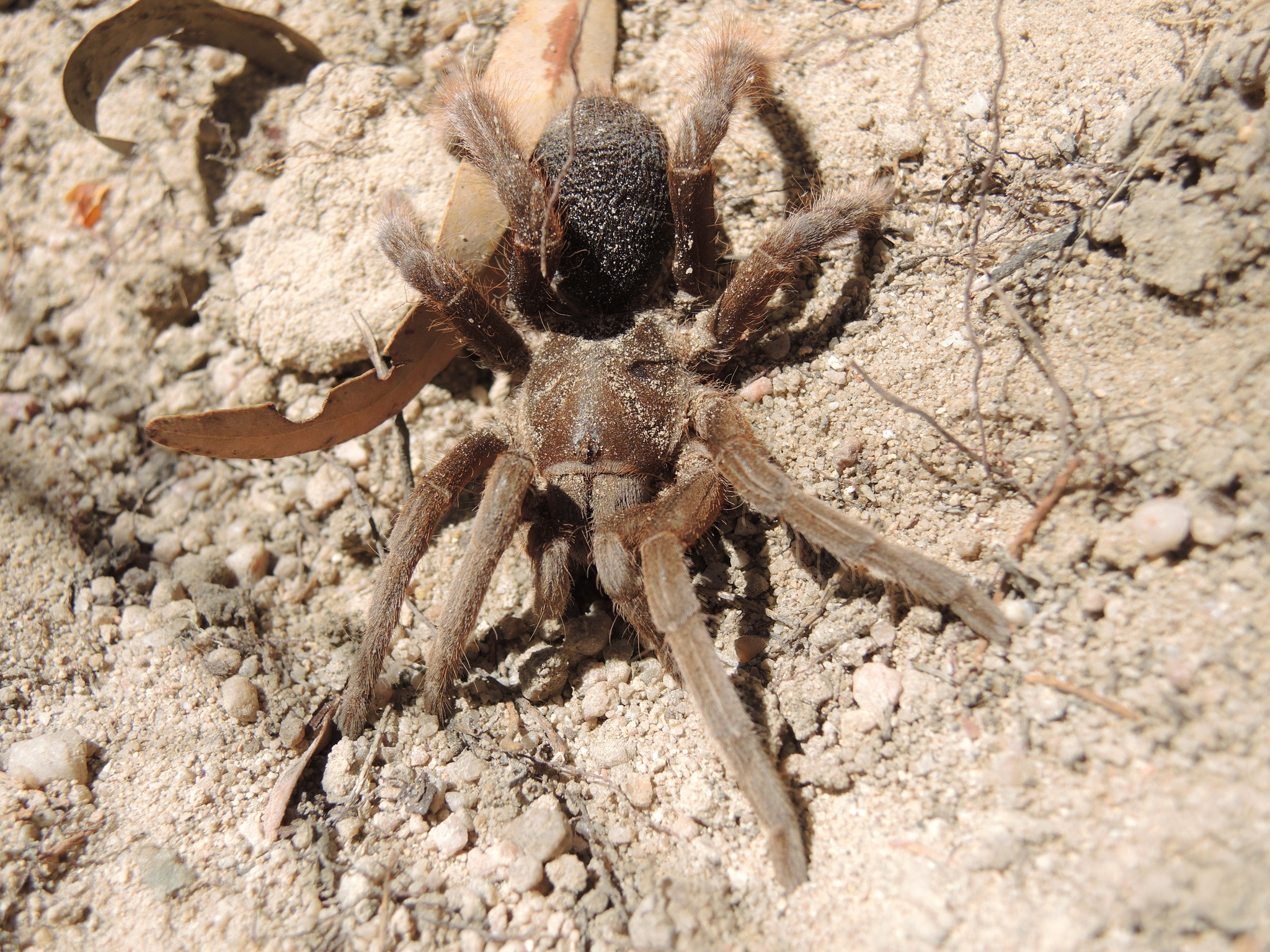

Scientific classification
- Kingdom: Animalia
- Phylum: Arthropoda
- Subphylum: Chelicerata
- Class: Arachnida
- Order: Araneae
- Infraorder: Mygalomorphae
- Family: Theraphosidae
- Genus: Selenotypus
- Species: S. plumipes

Binomial name
- Selenotypus plumipes Pocock, 1895

= Selenotypus =

Genus of spiders

The genus Selenotypus includes one of the largest of Australia's theraphosids. At present, the only recognised species within this genus is S. plumipes, but this is expected to change, as the genus has a wide distribution, and at present Australian theraphosids are poorly classified.

== Morphology ==
S. plumipes is one of Australia's largest spiders. Adult legspans can exceed 16 centimetres (6 1/2 in), with fang lengths of up to 1 centimetre (3/8 in). Various shades of brown its 4th legs are longer than its forelegs, and it has large piloerect bristles on its rear two pairs of legs. This has led to its common name "Australian Featherleg".

== Venom ==
S. plumipes' venom is used in insecticide development. Hardy et al., 2013 isolate and employ the venom, demonstrating efficacy as an insecticide.

== Behaviour ==
Like all Australian theraphosids, and old world tarantulas in general, S. plumipes are reclusive, while defensive if disturbed. The species has a reputation as calmer than other Australian species. Like most Australian tarantulas, S. plumipes has the ability to hiss if agitated, known as stridulation.

S. plumipes inhabit arid-zone grassland regions, and are adapted to live in these harsh conditions. The species are obligate burrowers, constructing burrows up to 50 cm deep, which helps maintain temperature. During bush-fires, they may place snail-shells over their burrows to keep out the heat.

They are largely opportunistic predators, and will take most prey items they can overpower. Small birds from farms, such as baby chickens, having been preyed upon. Their venom is not deadly to humans, but their large fangs can cause mechanical damage, and local symptoms such as swelling and pain can be felt. In some rare instances, systemic symptoms such as nausea can occur. Its venom contains the most powerful insecticidal peptide among spiders.

== Species ==
- Selenotypus plumipes Pocock, 1895 — Queensland

== In captivity ==
The keeping of tarantulas in captivity is a growing hobby in Australia, but with the country's strict import laws, only local species can be kept. As one of Australia's slowest-growing species, S. plumipes is not ideal, according to Queensland Museum.

A glass fish tank is sufficient for keeping them, with a variety of substrates, peat moss or coconut peat are often recommended. Humidity is important, especially when the spider is moulting, although fresh air should be allowed to circulate. A shallow water bowl should be provided. Misting of the tank is recommended if the tank becomes dry.

When young, the spider can be fed regularly, but as it grows older, once or twice a week is sufficient. Prey items can include crickets, wood cockroaches, mealworms and, when fully grown, pinkie mice.

Thousands of tarantulas are estimated to be taken from the wild each year, mostly from Queensland. This rate of harvest is unsustainable. Some collectors use their spiders for captive breeding. For the fast-growing bigger species, such as Phlogius crassipes, this is a better solution than wild harvest.

Although S. plumipes is fairly docile compared to other Australian tarantulas, it is nevertheless venomous, and should not be handled.
