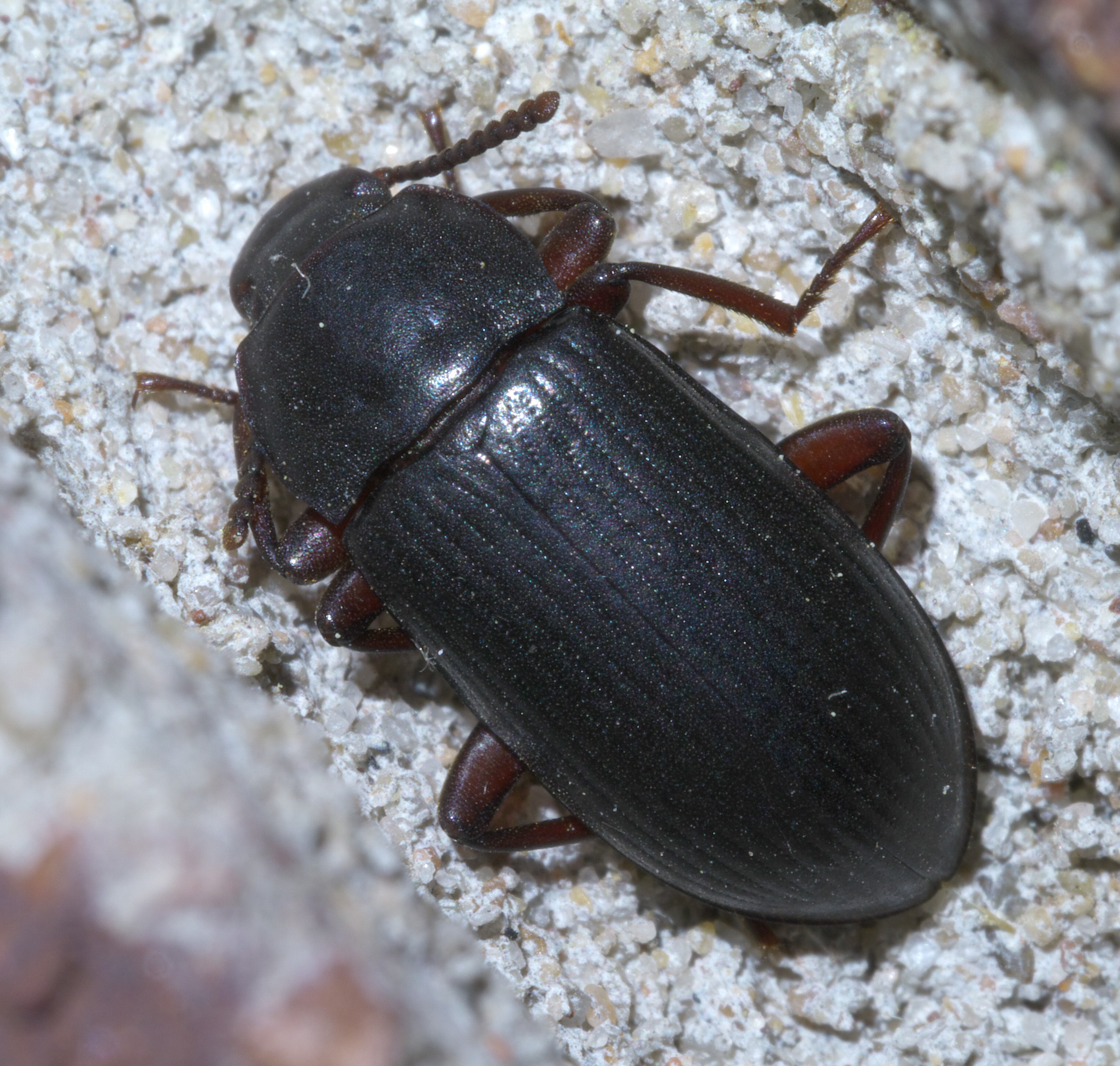
- Neatus tenebrioides

Scientific classification
- Domain: Eukaryota
- Kingdom: Animalia
- Phylum: Arthropoda
- Class: Insecta
- Order: Coleoptera
- Suborder: Polyphaga
- Infraorder: Cucujiformia
- Family: Tenebrionidae
- Tribe: Tenebrionini
- Genus: Neatus; Leconte, 1862

= Neatus =

Genus of beetles

Neatus is a genus of darkling beetles in the family Tenebrionidae. There are at least four described species in Neatus.

== Species ==
These four species belong to the genus Neatus:

- Neatus noctivagus (Mulsant & Rey, 1854)^{g}
- Neatus picipes (Herbst, 1797)^{g}
- Neatus subaequalis (Reitter, 1920)^{g}
- Neatus tenebrioides (Beauvois)^{g b}

Data sources: i = ITIS, c = Catalogue of Life, g = GBIF, b = Bugguide.net
