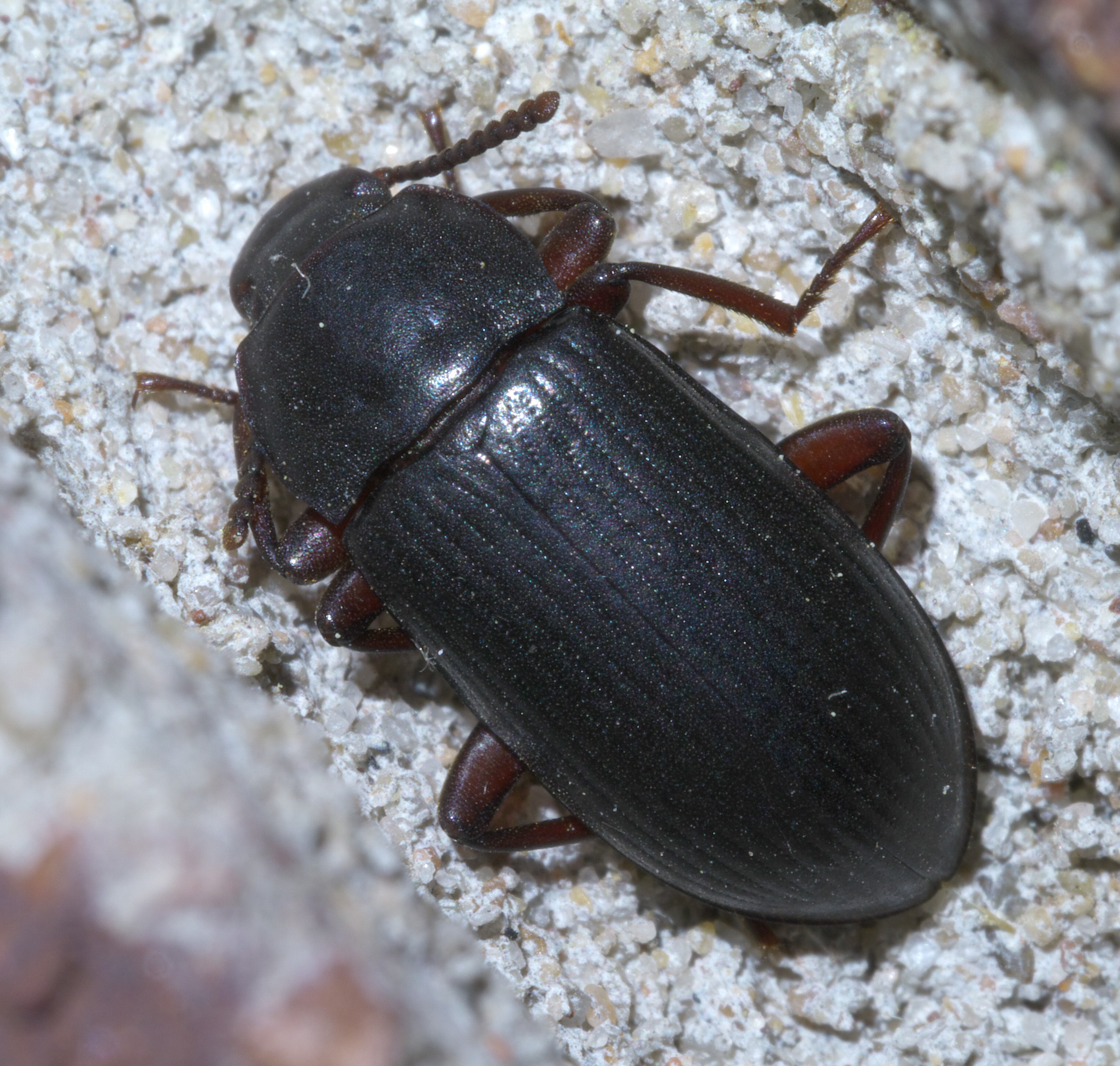

Scientific classification
- Domain: Eukaryota
- Kingdom: Animalia
- Phylum: Arthropoda
- Class: Insecta
- Order: Coleoptera
- Suborder: Polyphaga
- Infraorder: Cucujiformia
- Family: Tenebrionidae
- Genus: Neatus
- Species: N. tenebrioides

Binomial name
- Neatus tenebrioides (Beauvois)

Synonyms
- Helops tenebrioïdes Palisot de Beauvois, 1805

= Neatus tenebrioides =

Species of beetle

Neatus tenebrioides is a species of darkling beetle in the family Tenebrionidae.
