= Bius =

Scientific classification
- Kingdom: Animalia
- Phylum: Arthropoda
- Class: Insecta
- Order: Coleoptera
- Suborder: Polyphaga
- Infraorder: Cucujiformia
- Family: Tenebrionidae
- Tribe: Tenebrionini
- Genus: Bius; Dejean, 1834

Synonyms
- Bia Hope, 1840; Dendroscopius Gistl, 1848, 1854

Genus of beetles

Bius is a genus of beetles belonging to the family Tenebrionidae.

== Species ==
The following species are recognised in the genus Bius:

- Bius estriatus
- Bius thoracicus
