= Idiobates =

Scientific classification
- Domain: Eukaryota
- Kingdom: Animalia
- Phylum: Arthropoda
- Class: Insecta
- Order: Coleoptera
- Suborder: Polyphaga
- Infraorder: Cucujiformia
- Family: Tenebrionidae
- Genus: Idiobates
- Species: I. castaneus

Binomial name
- Idiobates castaneus Casey 1892

Genus of beetles

Idiobates is a monotypic genus of beetles in the family Tenebrionidae. Its only member is Idiobates castaneus.
