= Phenoloxidase system =

Invertebrates defense system

Phenoloxidase system is a major defense system in many invertebrates which ultimately leads to melanization of pathogens and damaged tissues. The process of melanization depends on activation of the enzyme phenoloxidase (PO) which is controlled by the prophenoloxidase (proPO) activation system.

During activation of the proPO cascade, many other immune reactions are produced, such as cytotoxic, opsonic and encapsulation activities. The phenoxidase cascade plays an important role in invertebrates (especially insects) in three physiologically important processes: immune reactions, sclerotization of the cuticle and wound healing.

== Prophenolxidase activation system ==
The phenoloxidase system begins with the recognition of microbial PAMPs (pathogen-associated molecular patterns) including LPS (gram-negative bacteria), peptidoglycans (gram-positive bacteria) and β-1,3-glucans (fungi). Interaction of PAMPs with PRPs (pattern-recognition proteins) activates a series of serine proteinases and those proteolytically cleave the prophenoloxidase (proPO) zymogen and activate phenoxidase (PO).

During the proPO system activation, reactive intermediates such as quinone-like intermediates, reactive oxygen (ROI) or nitrogen intermediates are produced. These have cytotoxic activity against microorganisms, prevent organism from entering of another pathogen and also assist in wound healing.

== Melanization process ==
Active PO plays an important role in the initial stages of the melanization process. The PO catalyses a hydroxylation of monophenols (tyrosine) on diphenols and oxidation of diphenols to dichinones. The chinones non-enzymatically change their structure to dopachrome and then dopachrome isomerase changes dopachrome to indole. In the final phase of the process melanin is made by an oxidation and a polymerization. Melanin is rapidly deposited around the pathogen, thereby limiting its ability to damage the host organism. Storage of melanin at the site of damage also prevents further loss of hemolymph.

Long-term or overproduce of substances arising during a PO cascade can lead to tissue damage and cell death at the site of the reaction. For this reason, these reactions are strictly regulated.
