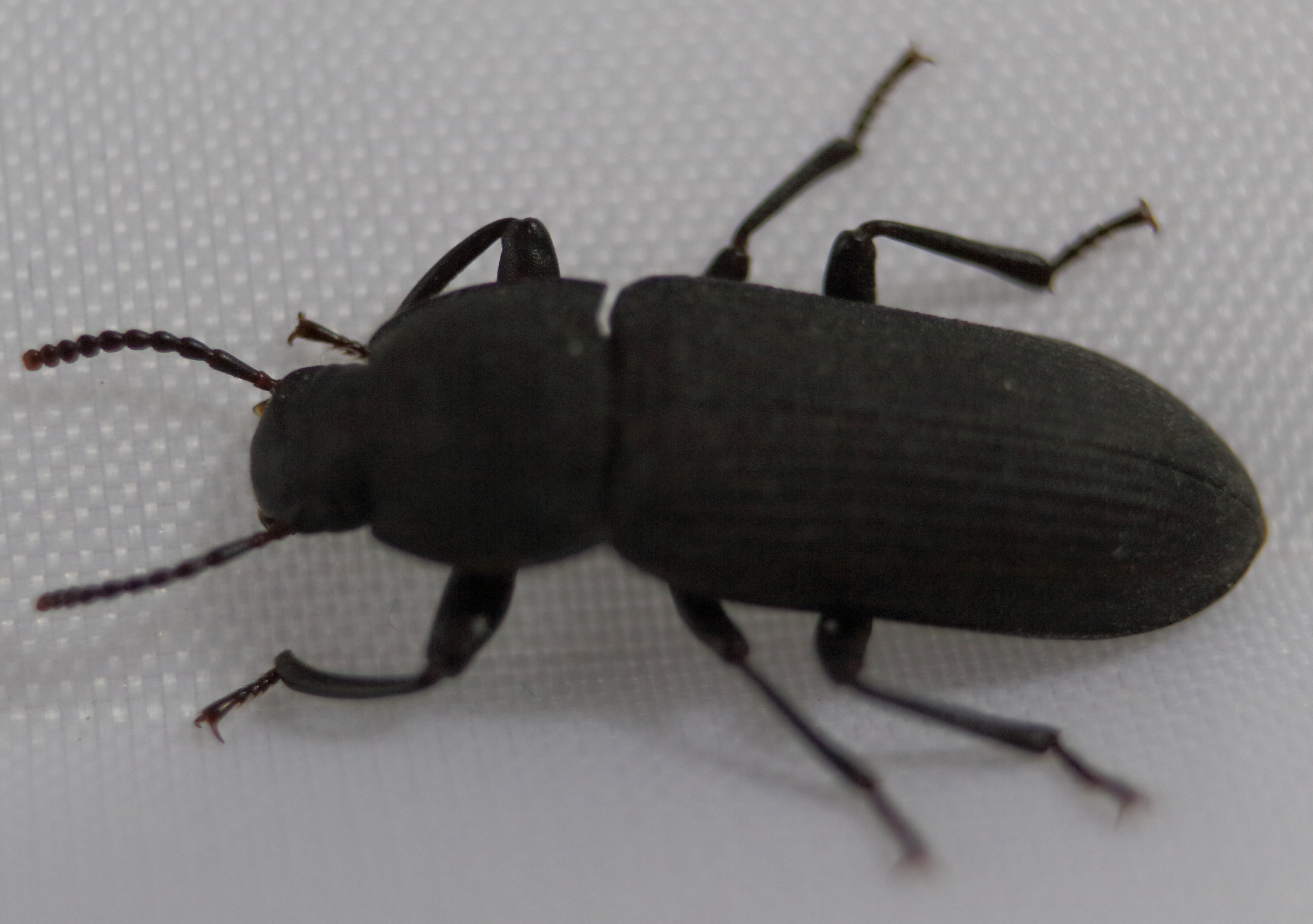

Scientific classification
- Kingdom: Animalia
- Phylum: Arthropoda
- Clade: Pancrustacea
- Class: Insecta
- Order: Coleoptera
- Suborder: Polyphaga
- Infraorder: Cucujiformia
- Family: Tenebrionidae
- Genus: Tenebrio
- Species: T. obscurus

Binomial name
- Tenebrio obscurus Fabricius, 1792

= Tenebrio obscurus =

Species of beetle

Tenebrio obscurus, or the dark mealworm beetle, is a species of darkling beetle whose larvae are known as mini mealworms. These insects should not be confused with younger mealworms (Tenebrio molitor) or with the confused flour beetle (Tribolium confusum).

Tenebrio obscurus larvae resemble very small mealworms. Larvae are cylindrical and initially white, darkening as they mature. Larvae can reach a length of 25 to 30 millimetres (0.98 to 1.18 in). Larvae then pupate, and later emerge as small, black beetles, 12 to 18 millimetres (0.47 to 0.71 in) long. In appearance, adults are similar to the yellow mealworm. They may have a lighter brown color or appear dull rather than shiny.

Mini mealworm larvae are used as a feeder insect for birds, reptile and amphibian pets, and zoo animals.

Both Tenebrio obscurus and Tenebrio molitor are being studied for their ability to biodegrade waste polystyrene products.
