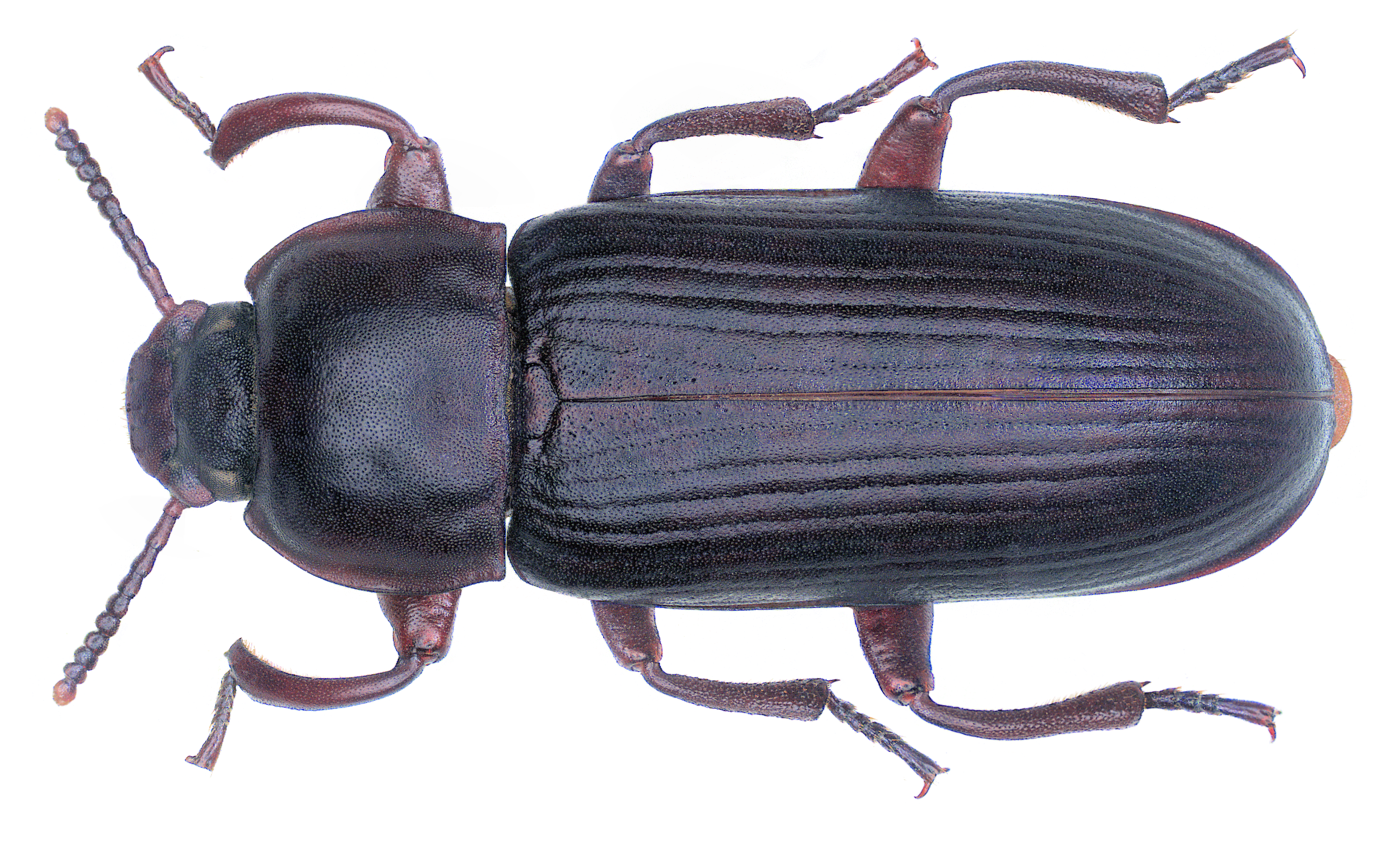

Scientific classification
- Kingdom: Animalia
- Phylum: Arthropoda
- Clade: Pancrustacea
- Class: Insecta
- Order: Coleoptera
- Suborder: Polyphaga
- Infraorder: Cucujiformia
- Family: Tenebrionidae
- Genus: Tenebrio
- Species: T. molitor

Binomial name
- Tenebrio molitor Linnaeus, 1758

= Mealworm =

Mealworm Temporal range: Holocene, 0.003–0 Ma

Species of darkling beetle, larval form

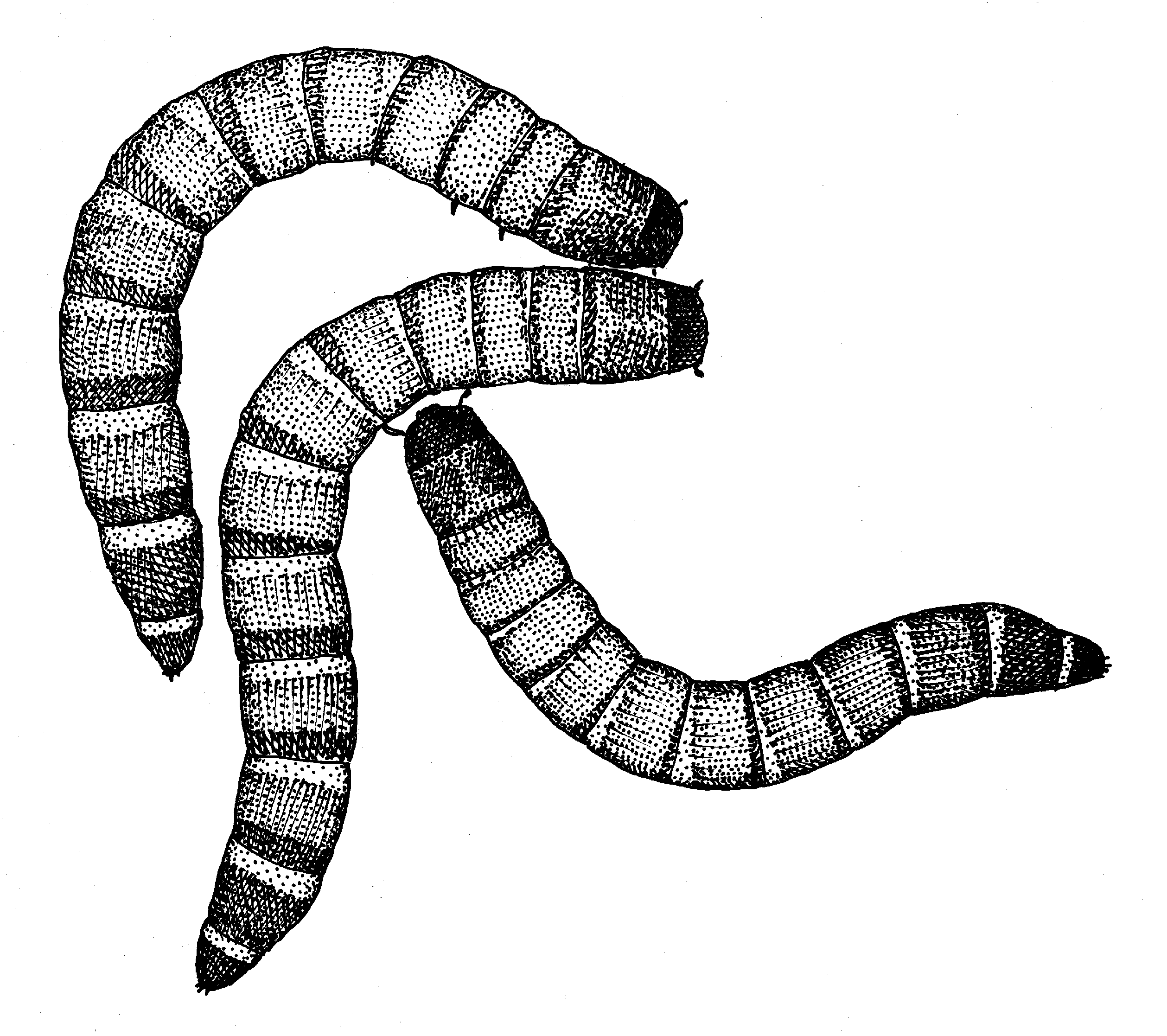
Mealworms, larvae of Tenebrio molitor, illustrated by Des Helmore

Mealworms are the larval form of the yellow mealworm beetle, Tenebrio molitor, a species of darkling beetle.

The yellow mealworm beetle prefers a warmer climate and higher humidity. Male mealworm beetles release a sex pheromone to attract females to mate.

Tenebrio molitor has been used in biomedical research. Mealworms can be a dietary source for animals and humans. They are also considered pests, especially to food storage.

== Description ==
Like all holometabolic insects, T. molitor goes through four life stages: egg, larva, pupa, and adult. Larvae typically measure about 2.5 centimetres (0.98 in) or more. Adults are generally 1.25 to 1.8 centimetres (0.49 to 0.71 in) in length.

T. molitor is dark brown or black as an adult, with larvae up to 1.25 inches (3.2 cm) long and adults up to 0.75 inches (1.9 cm) long.

The yellow mealworm beetle can be differentiated from other beetles, due to the linear grooves that are evenly divided and run along the abdomen. The beetle has only four tarsal segments on its hind legs. Most ground beetles, which are similar in size to Tenebrio molitor, have five tarsal segments.

Commonly mistaken with the black mealworm beetle (T. obscurus), key variations in regard to size and shape distinguish these two. The abdomen of the adult black mealworm beetle is more rounded and ends in a pointed tip, as opposed to the more rectangular and blunt-ended abdomen of the yellow mealworm beetle. The larvae of T. molitor are lighter colored than those of T. obscurus.

== Distribution ==
Mealworms most-likely originated in the Mediterranean region, but are now present in many areas of the world as a result of human trade and colonization. The oldest archaeological records of mealworms can be traced to Bronze Age Turkey. Records from the British Isles and northern Europe are from a later date, and mealworms are conspicuously absent from archaeological finds from ancient Egypt.

== Life cycle ==
The eggs hatch 4 to 19 days after the female oviposits.

During the larval stage, the mealworms feed on vegetation and dead insects, and molt between each larval stage, or instar (9 to 20 instars). After the final molt, they pupate. The new pupa is whitish and turns brown over time. After 3 to 30 days, depending on environmental conditions such as temperature, it emerges as an adult beetle.

=== As larvae ===
In studies, T. molitor larvae show an incubation period of seven to eight days and a period of three to four days for the first instar. After the first instar, there is significant variation for the number of days in each instar period, though variation may be due to malnutrition or pathogens. Before emergence, most larvae typically go through 15 to 17 instars, with very few larvae going through the 19 to 20 instars.

The body length of the larvae gradually increases with each successive instar, reaching maximum length at the 17th instar. The body length decreases beyond the 17th instar. Pupation occurs after the 14th instar, with most larvae showing total pupation between the 15th and 17th instars. Larvae are white in the first instar and gradually turn brown after the second instar.

=== Effect of parental age and temperature ===
Offspring produced by older beetles have shorter larval stages than those produced by younger beetles. Larvae from the older beetles also show a rapid weight increase at an earlier age than those from young parents. At 25 °C, the larval stage was shortened, the number of larval molts decreased, and the durations of adult life decreased when parental age increased, compared to the beetles at 30 °C. Another study found that at 20°, 25°, and 30 °C, parental age does not have any effect on the duration of the egg stage, or the weights of the eggs.

However, the amount of hatched eggs decreased when parental age increased. When eggs were laid during the first two months after emergence, approximately 90% of the eggs hatched. When they were laid after four months, only about 50% hatched. It was found that larvae from young parents grow at a slower rate, compared to larvae produced by the same parents, nine weeks earlier. At 30 °C, there were no other effects of parental age on the larvae. At 20° and 25 °C, the larvae from young parents required significantly more time to complete development, and had more molts compared to the larvae from the same parents after they had aged one more or longer. The duration of adult life decreased when parental age increased.

== Reproduction ==
Tenebrio molitor larvae eating an apple slice

A sex pheromone released by male mealworm beetles has been identified. Inbreeding reduces the attractiveness of sexual pheromone signaling by male mealworm beetles. Females are more attracted to the odors produced by outbred males than the odors produced by inbred males. The reduction of male signaling capability may be due to increased expression of homozygous deleterious recessive alleles, caused by inbreeding.

The mealworm beetle breeds prolifically. Males insert sperm packets with their aedeagus. Within a few days, the female burrows into soft ground and lays eggs. Over her adult lifespan of about 6–12 months, a female will, on average, lay about 500 eggs.

== Mating ==
Researchers examined whether female beetles preferred males infected by the tapeworm Hymenolepis diminuta as mates, or noninfected males. Virgin females were found to spend more time near—and to copulate more often with—noninfected males in the experiment. Mating behavior was also found to be influenced by the mass of the male beetle. A larger male was preferred and mated with first compared to a smaller male mate. Overall, female beetles showed mating preferences for noninfected males who were larger in size. One explanation provided by researchers for this finding is that larger, noninfected males may allow females to gain genetic or material benefits.

=== Immunocompetence ===
Evidence suggests that in many animal species, secondary sexual traits reflect male immunocompetence, the ability of an individual's immune system to resist and control pathogens or parasites. A study found that a single parasite-like immunological challenge, created via a nylon monofilament implant in the beetle, significantly reduced the sexual attractiveness and locomotor activity of males, but did not negatively affect their survival. When the inserts were removed, the majority of the males showed greater encapsulation responses of the implant, though some of the males seemed to have already chosen a terminal reproductive investment strategy. And thus, the majority of males invest in their immune system after the first challenge.

A second immune challenge increased their attractiveness, but was found to significantly reduce locomotor activity of the males and increase their mortality. This represents a trade-off between pheromone production and energy required for activities such as immune system recovery and locomotor activity.

When there was a third challenge implantation in the same males, there was a lower encapsulation rate of the nylon implants in more attractive males than the less attractive, showing that the males made no attempts to boost their immune system. The results suggest that males that become sexually attractive after the second immune challenge have a trade-off, where they sacrifice locomotor activity and do not energetically invest in immune system recovery. This shows that the female mealworm beetles consistently preferred males that invested significantly less in immune system recovery, and that males are not able to allocate resources simultaneously both to improving their health or, in this case, recovery of their immune system, and to increasing their sexual attractiveness.

=== Nutritional condition ===
Pheromones are chemical signals that function as mate attractors and relay important information to prospective mates. For a reliable signal, it must be costly to produce, which means it is likely to have condition dependent expression. A study found that female preference of the pheromones was dependent on the nutritional condition of the males. They spent significantly more time with males who received constant food, than males who received no food. Phenoloxidase activity was dependent on the nutritional condition of the males, with phenoloxidase activity being two to six times higher in males with constant food, than in males who received no food. However, nutritional conditions had no effect on the encapsulation rate of the males.

When receiving constant food, male initial body mass had no correlations with phenoloxidase activity or encapsulation rate. This shows that pheromone mediated attractiveness and the immunocompetence in terms of phenoloxidase activity of males were condition-dependent, as both decreased with nutritional stress. This suggests that there is a trade-off between allocation of resources and energy into the production of pheromones and immunocompetence, and that the production of pheromones are condition dependent sexual traits.

== Immune defense ==
The mealworm beetle is currently considered a pest when infesting and degrading the quality of stored grains or grain products. However, they are now being promoted as a beneficial insect, as their high nutrient content makes them a viable food source for pet food, protein-rich animal feed, or even human nutrition, and they are capable of degrading plastic waste and polystyrene. These benefits make mealworms attractive for mass rearing, a technique that promotes disease transmission within the colonies. T. molitor can be the host of many different pathogens and parasites, including entomopathogenic microbes, protozoa, and tapeworms, which can decrease the mealworm beetle's survival or reproductive success.

=== Behavioral immunity ===
When the mealworms feed on infected rodent feces, they may consume the eggs of the parasitic tapeworm Hymenolepis diminuta. Infected male beetles pay a higher reproductive cost than the female beetles. T. molitor displays behavioral immunity when exposed to H. diminuta, shown by how the infected males develop an avoidance behavior for feces that harbor the tapeworm, which decreases their probability of coming into contact with the tapeworm in the future. The female mealworm beetles develop a qualitative resistance through mate choice, as they are able to evaluate male immunocompetence through pheromone signaling, allowing them to choose the more immunologically fit males as mates. This also reduces the probability of the females being infected by their mates, and may cause them to pass on an enhanced level of immunocompetence to their offspring.

Another way mealworms may display behavioral immunity is how they may tolerate infections by limiting negative effects on their reproductive success. For example, mealworm beetles tolerate a high number of cysticercoids of H. diminuta at the expense of their own fitness and longevity. Conversely, males produce enhanced spermatophores containing superior nuptial gifts; once transferred, these investments elevate female fecundity and fertilization success.

=== Cuticular color ===
Cuticular color (pigmentation of the cuticle) is a heritable component and varies from tan to black. In the mealworm beetle, evidence suggests that population level variation in cuticular color is linked to pathogen resistance in that darker individuals are more resistant to pathogens. A study found that two immune parameters related to resistance, haemocyte density and pre-immune challenge activity of phenoloxidase, were significantly higher in selection lines of black beetles compared to tan lines. Higher haemocyte density is likely indicative of a heightened immune response.

There were no effects of gender on the immune traits. Cuticular color is dependent on melanin production, which requires phenoloxidase, an enzyme that is present in its inactive form inside haemocytes. This shows why darker insects have a heightened immune response and are more resistant to pathogens that invade the hemocoel via the cuticle. However, there was no significant difference in haemolymph antibacterial activity between black and tan lines, explained by how antimicrobial peptides are produced by haemocytes but are not involved in cuticular darkening.

In T. molitor, the degree of cuticular melanization is a strong indicator of resistance to the entomopathogenic fungus Metarhizium anisopliae, which could be explained by the thicker and less porous cuticle displayed by darker insects compared to lighter ones. However, there seems to be underlying trade-offs that prevent the fixation of the darker phenotype, shown by how the plasticity of melanization phenotypes in response to population density may contribute to the absence of predominance of darker individuals among T. molitor populations.

=== Food restriction ===
Because immune defenses against parasites and pathogens require metabolic resources, food restriction can impair immune function of T. molitor. For adult T. molitor beetles, phenoloxidase activity can be reduced by half during short-term food deprivation, but returns rapidly to original levels when the beetles are given access to food again. T. molitor larvae can eat five times more food per day than usual following an immune challenge, to compensate for the caloric loss from the immune response. These immune challenged larvae show significant weight loss when fed with either protein or carbohydrate rich diets, but show stable weights when given both protein and carbohydrate-rich diets.

Healthy T. molitor larvae usually prefer diets with a lower protein to carbohydrate ratio, but shift toward food with higher protein contents after an immune challenge with bacteria. This causes enhanced hemocyte circulation and antibacterial activity in the hemolymph, which likely maximizes resistance against bacterial infection. However, phenoloxidase activity is not affected by this shift in diet choice.

A study found that the effects of nutritional imbalance on body composition were buffered by the subsequent selection of complementary foods. This demonstrates that the mealworm beetles are capable of compensating for nutritional imbalances and that the way nutritional balance is restored depends on the nutrient that is initially deficient in their food. For example, if the beetles were previously fed a protein-rich, carbohydrate-deficient diet, they would prefer carbohydrates to protein, whereas beetles fed a carbohydrate-rich, protein-deficient diet, they would strongly prefer a protein-rich diet. They found that self-selecting T. molitor beetles recovered from carbohydrate or protein deficiency within six days by selecting the complementary diet.

== Gut microbiota ==
The gut microbiota of T. molitor consists of many different bacterial species present at low abundance. A study found a predominance of genus Spiroplasma species in the phylum Tenericutes in the gut samples of T. molitor, but there was variation found in the community composition between individuals. Although some Spiroplasma species are known insect pathogens, the T. molitor larvae did not experience any harmful effects from the presence of the Spiroplasma in the gut, indicating that they are not pathogens to the host.

By comparing this to the bacterial communities found in other insects, it was found that the Spiroplasma species found were specific to T. molitor. The gut bacteria community structure was not significantly affected by the presence of antibiotics or by the exposure of the beetle larvae to a more highly diverse soil bacteria community. There is a negative relationship between bacterial diversity and ampicillin concentration, meaning ampicillin treatment caused a reduction in the bacterial community size, which was determined with pyrosequencing of the 16S rRNA gene, and no negative relationship when kanamycin was added.

Polystyrene foam decreases T. molitor fecundity, but the beetle can fully develop using the plastic as its primary source of food, which makes it an interesting alternative to recycle polystyrene. However, when the mealworm's microbiota is disrupted by an antibiotic treatment, it loses its ability to digest polystyrene, suggesting that its associated gut microbes are essential in the digestion process. Specifically, the bacterium Exiguobacterium firmicutes, which was isolated from the midgut of mealworms, was demonstrated to degrade polystyrene in vitro.

== Relationship with humans ==
=== As feed and pet food ===
Mealworms are typically used as a pet food for captive reptiles, fish, birds, and some small mammals. They are also provided to wild birds in bird feeders, particularly during the nesting season. Mealworms are useful for their high protein content. They are also used as fishing bait.

They are commercially available in bulk and are typically available in containers with bran or oatmeal for food. Commercial growers incorporate a juvenile hormone into the feeding process to keep the mealworm in the larval stage and achieve an abnormal length of 2 cm or greater.

=== As livestock feed ===
Mealworm has been investigated as a potential ingredient in livestock feed due to its high protein content and balanced amino acid profile, making it nutritionally suitable as a substitute for conventional protein sources such as fish meal or soybean meal. Although they can be raised in small spaces suitable for industrial production, life cycle assessment studies have shown that mealworm protein performs worse than soybean or fish meal protein in terms of energy use, greenhouse gas emissions, acidification and eutrophication.

=== As food ===
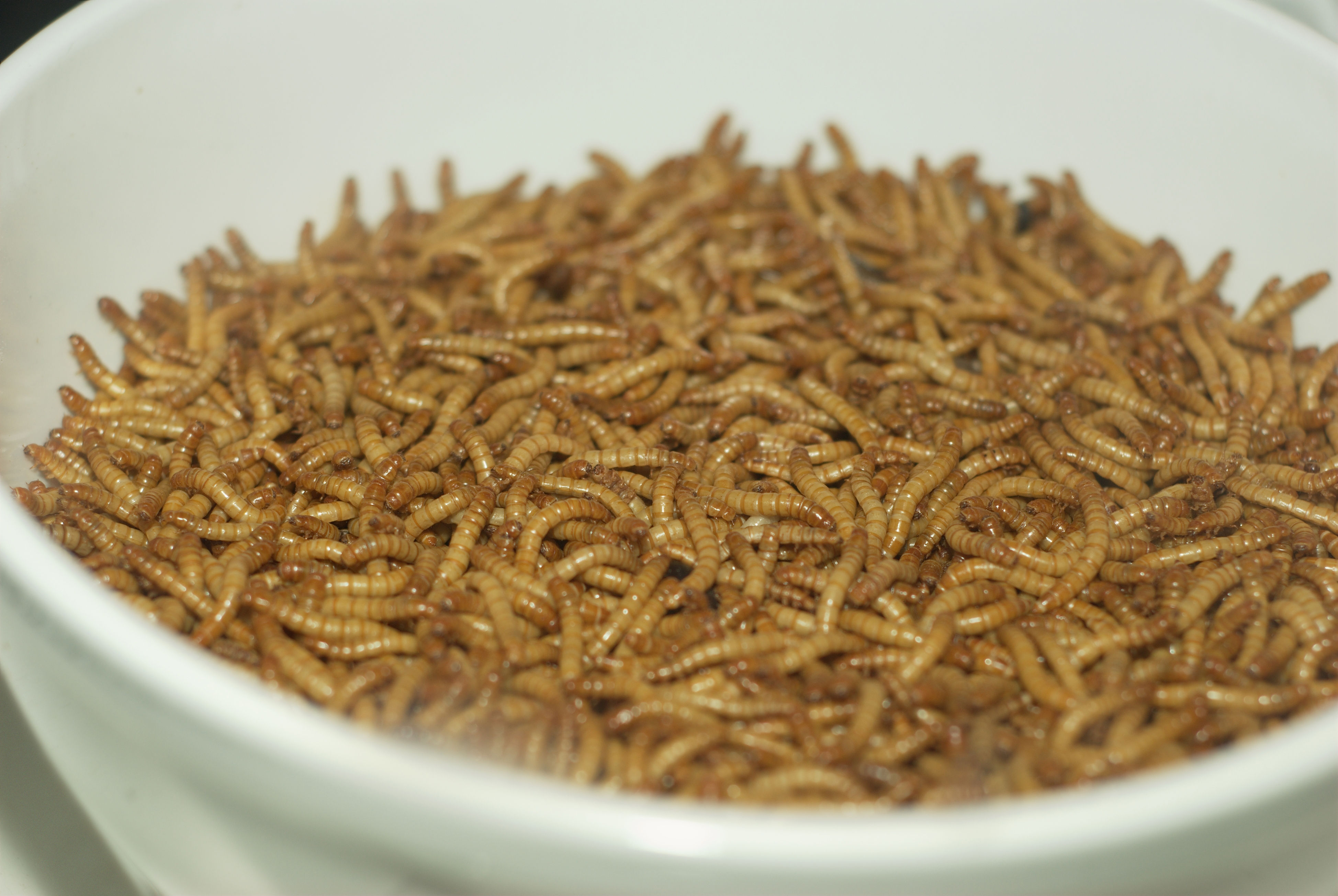
Mealworms in a bowl

Mealworms are edible for humans, and are processed into various food products available in food retail, including insect burgers. However, most insect-based foods are limited to snacks and protein bars, which are not intended to replace traditional meat consumption.

Due to their high protein and fat content, as well as large amounts of fiber, they represent a good food source for humans. They are rich in oleic acid, which may decrease low-density lipoprotein (LDL) and increase high-density lipoprotein (HDL) levels in the blood.

Mealworms have historically been consumed in many Asian countries, particularly in Southeast Asia. There, they are commonly found in food markets and sold as street food alongside other edible insects. Baked or fried mealworms have been marketed as a healthy snack food in recent history, though the consumption of mealworms goes back centuries. However, recent research has found that cultural attitudes and widespread disgust toward eating insects, particularly in Western countries, make it unlikely that insects will significantly replace meat in human diets.

In May 2017, mealworms were approved as food in Switzerland. In June 2021, dried mealworms were authorized as novel food in the European Union, after the European Food Safety Authority assessed the larvae as safe for human consumption.

Mealworm larvae contain significant nutrient content. Every 100 grams of raw mealworm larvae contains 206 kilocalories and anywhere from 14 to 25 grams of protein. Mealworm larvae contain levels of potassium, copper, sodium, selenium, iron and zinc that rival those of beef. Mealworms contain essential linoleic acids. They have a greater vitamin content by weight compared to beef, B12 not included.

Mealworms may be easily reared on fresh oats, wheat bran or grain, with sliced potato, carrots, or apple as a moisture source. The small amount of space required to raise mealworms has made them relevant for scalable industrialized mass production. But mealworm farming presents many challenges, including machinery clogging caused by the extremely fatty Tenebrio molitor larvae, as noted in the industrial-scale operations of Ynsect.

=== Possible health risks ===
Some evidence suggests that T. molitor may pose a health risk, as humans and animals can consume the eggs and larvae of the beetle with grain-based food. Although they are usually either digested or are excreted with feces, sometimes, they are able to survive and live in the alimentary tract. The first cases of T. molitor larvae in human organs date back to the 19th century, where their presence was observed in the gastrointestinal tract, including the stomach and intestines. There were other cases, such as a reported ulcer infestation of T. molitor in an AIDS patient and a concerned urinary canthariasis in a ten-year-old boy in Iran in 2019, which was the last reported human case of canthariasis caused by T. molitor. However, there are very few reported cases of live larvae in animals, and there are no reports of gastrointestinal canthariasis in farm animals.

A study analysing the results of patients in Poland for the presence of specific IgE antibodies to the mealworm was conducted prior to its widespread introduction as a food ingredient. Sensitisation to the mealworm was detected in 4.3% of the patients, with monosensitisation occurring rarely and affecting 0.7% of this group. It was determined that the presence of antibodies to the mealworm most often co-occurs with sensitization to other edible insects, such as the house cricket and the migratory locust, as well as to tropomyosins from shrimp and house dust mites. The primary or cross-sensitization may differ in different populations depending on the dietary habits or geographical zone.

=== In waste disposal ===
In 2015, it was discovered that 100 mealworms can degrade polystyrene into usable organic matter at a rate of about 34–39 milligrams per day. No difference was found between mealworms fed only Styrofoam and the mealworms fed conventional foods, during the one-month duration of the experiment. Microorganisms inside the mealworm's gut are responsible for degrading the polystyrene, proven by reducing the property of degradation when mealworms were given gentamicin. Isolated colonies of the mealworm's gut microbes, however, have proven less efficient at degradation than the bacteria within the gut.

== See also ==
- Zond 5, a 1968 space mission on which mealworms were among the first terrestrial organisms to travel to and circle the Moon.
- Plastivore

== Gallery ==
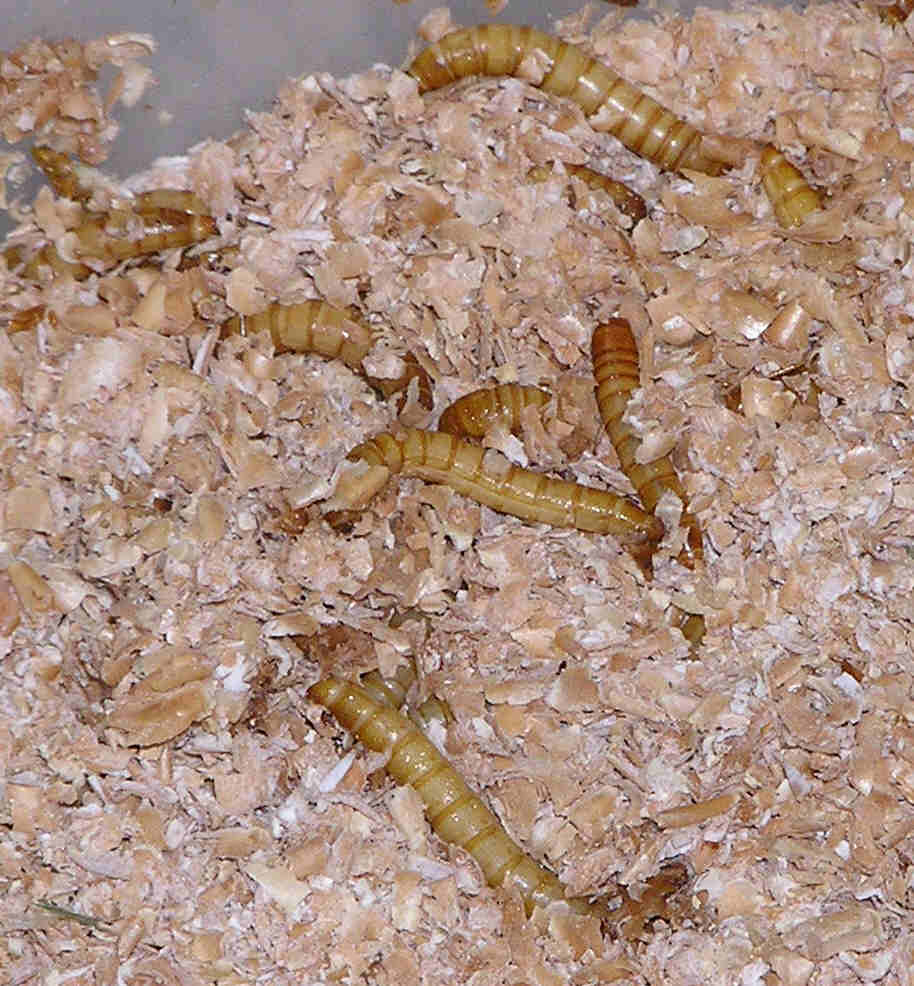
In a bedding of bran

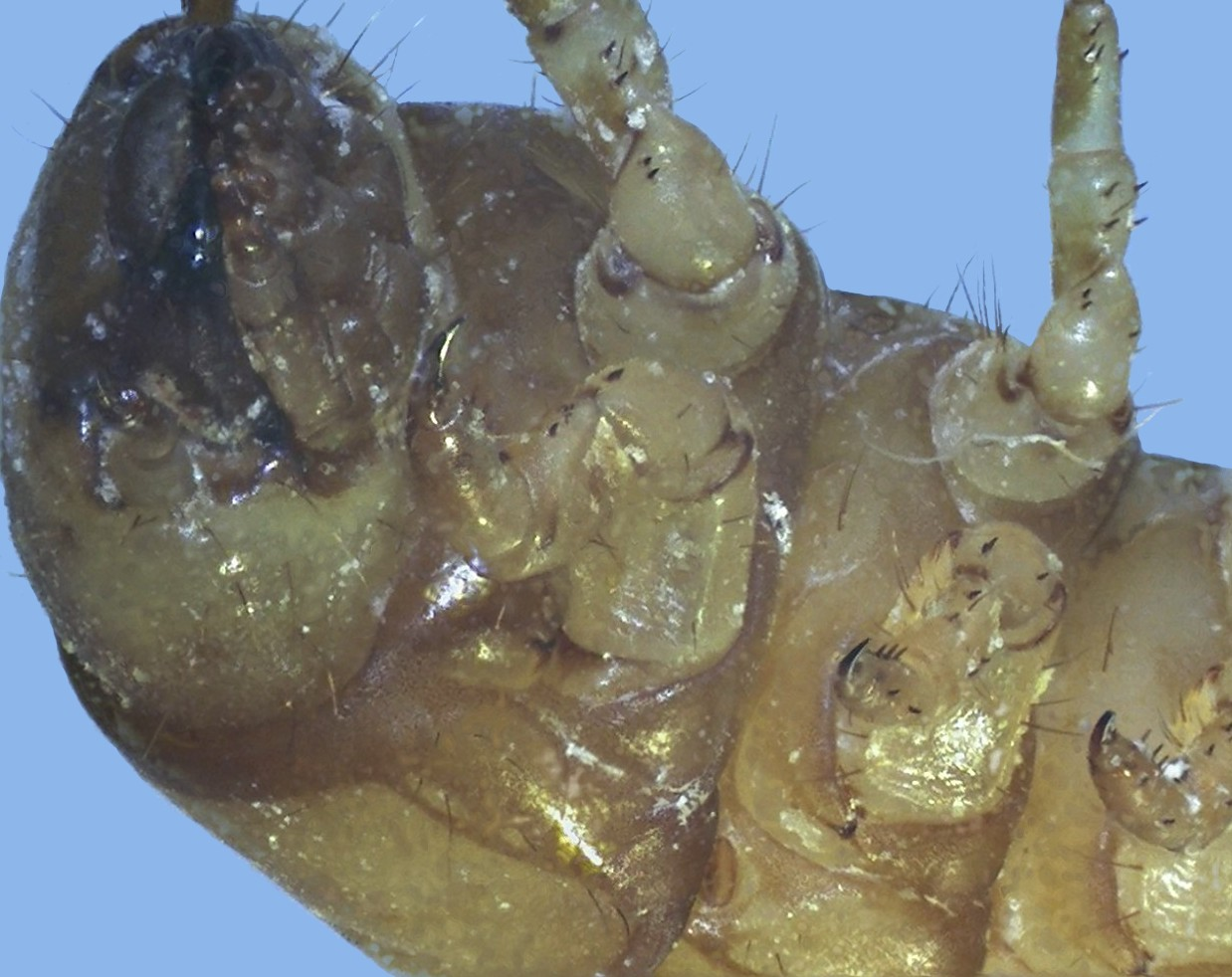
Mealworm detail

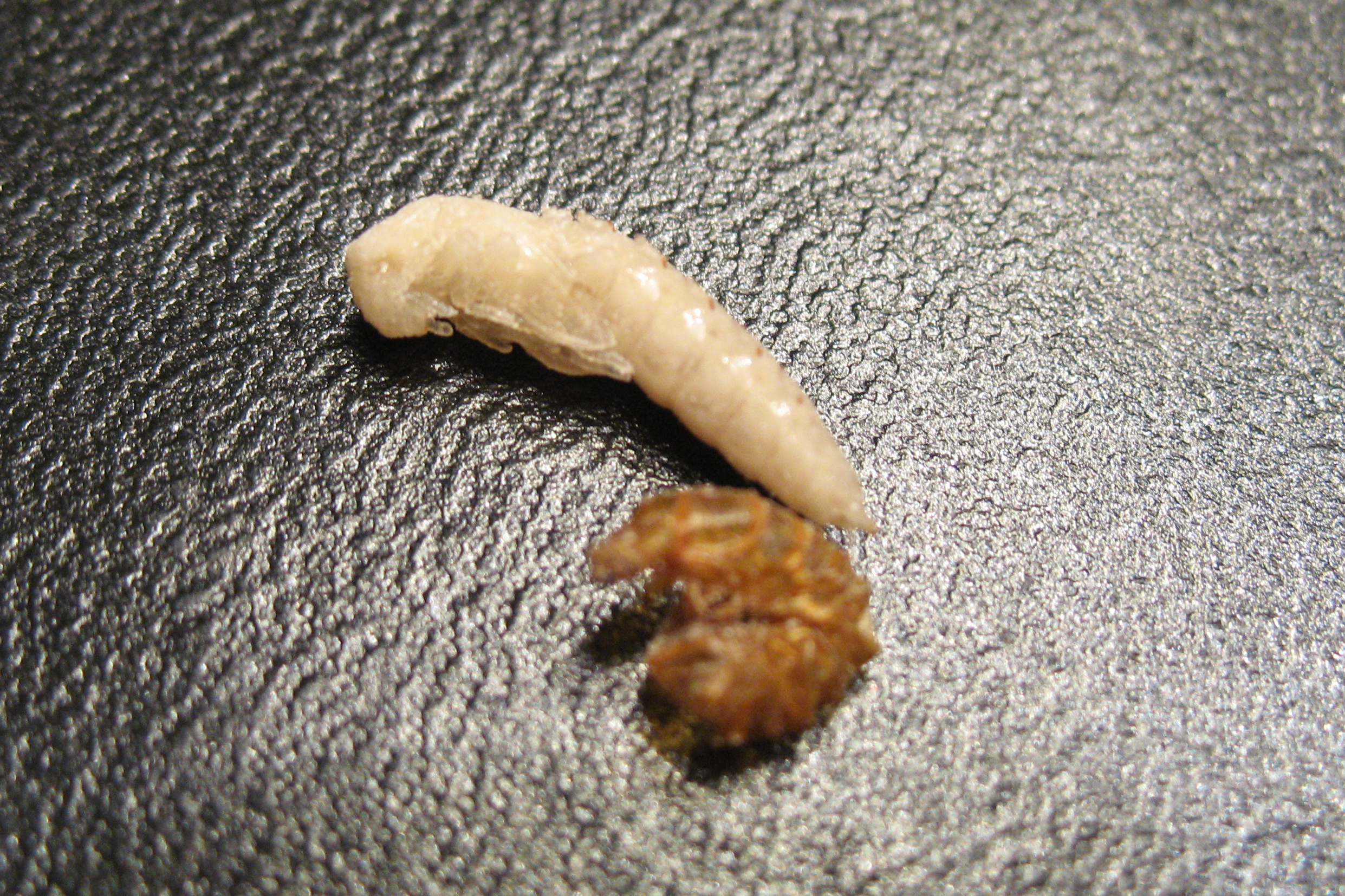
A mealworm pupa with molted larval skin

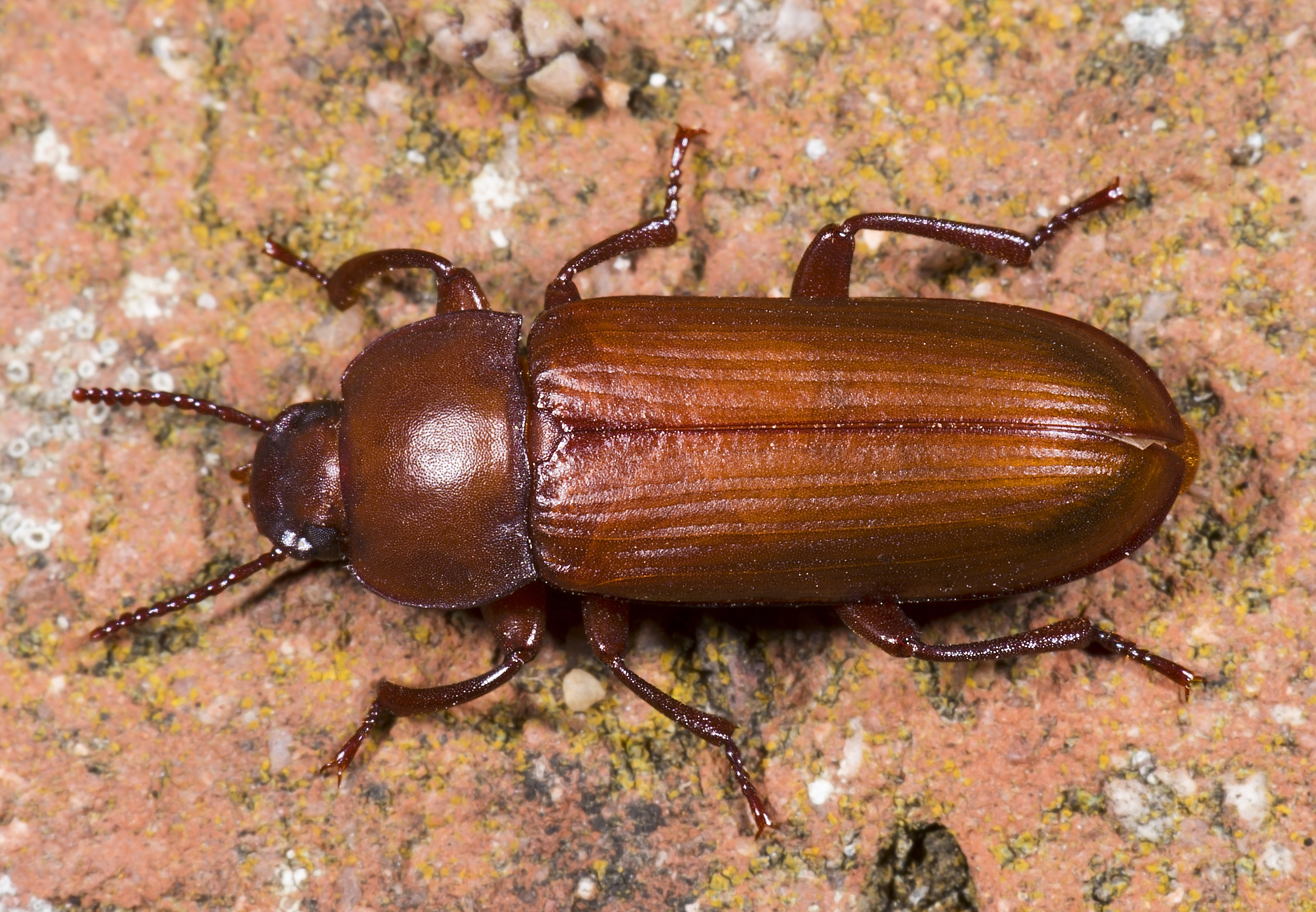
New adult

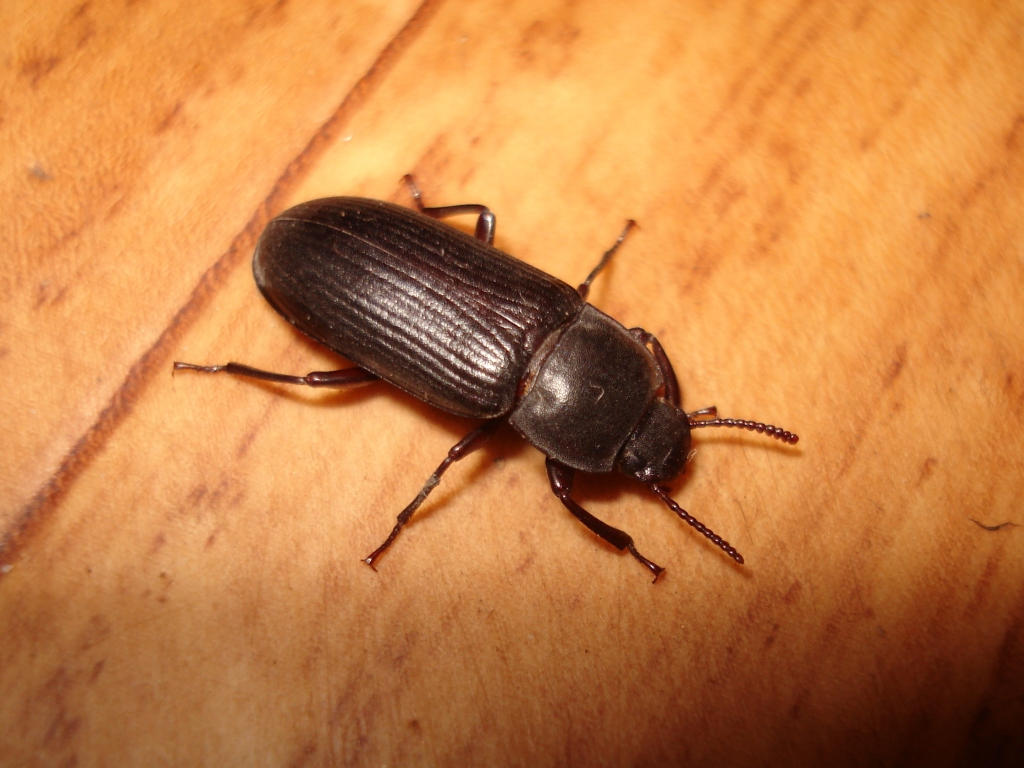
Mature adult
