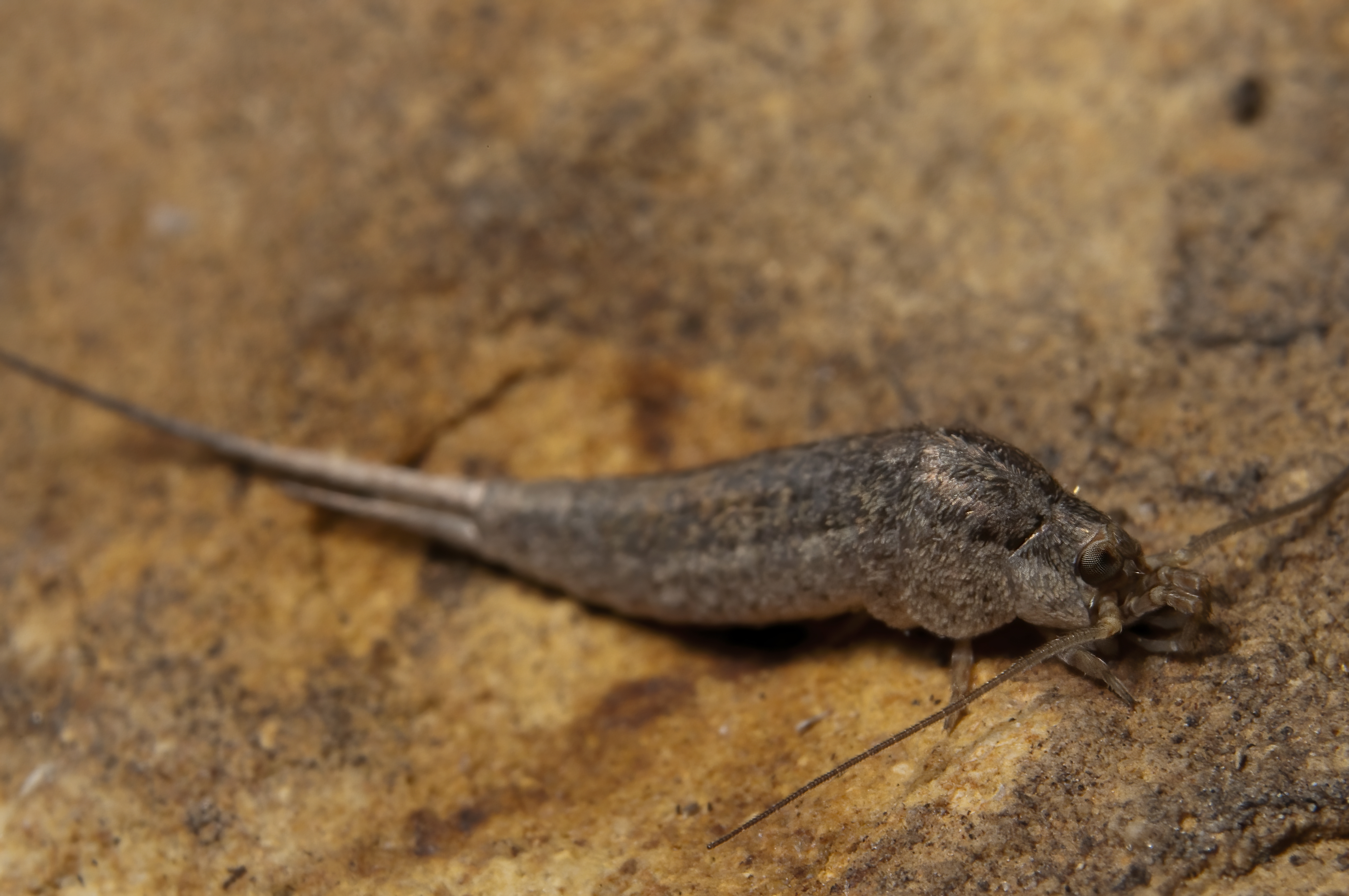
- Hypomachilodes forthaysi

Scientific classification
- Kingdom: Animalia
- Phylum: Arthropoda
- Clade: Pancrustacea
- Class: Insecta
- Order: Archaeognatha
- Suborder: Machilida; Zhang et al., 2018

Families
- Machilidae; Meinertellidae

= Machilida =

Machilida Temporal range: Middle Triassic – Present

Suborder of jumping bristletails

Machilida is a suborder of bristletails found on all continents except Antarctica.

== Morphology ==
=== Overview ===
Machilida are primitive, wingless insects characterized by an elongate, cylindrical body covered with overlapping scales and bearing three terminal filaments (two lateral cerci and a median epiproct). Adults typically range from about 8–20 mm in body length, excluding appendages.

=== Head ===
The head is hypognathous and large relative to the thorax, with prominent compound eyes that are contiguous medially in most species; ocelli are present and well developed. Antennae are long, multisegmented, and filiform, often exceeding body length.

=== Mouthparts ===
The mouthparts are ectognathous and adapted for detritivory or algivory, with robust mandibles bearing apical incisors and molar areas, maxillae with 5-segmented palps, and a 3-segmented labial palp.

=== Thorax ===
The thorax is arched dorsally, especially the meso- and metathorax, giving the body a hump-backed profile. Legs are cursorial and saltatorial: the hind femora are enlarged and muscular, enabling the characteristic jumping behavior; tarsi are 3-segmented with paired claws and an arolium.

=== Abdomen ===
The abdomen comprises 11 segments. Styli are present on abdominal segments II–IX, and eversible vesicles occur ventrally on segments II–VII, functioning in water uptake and osmoregulation. Dorsal tergites are typically imbricate with posteriorly directed setae; coloration is usually mottled gray, brown, or metallic due to the scale covering. The three caudal filaments are long and many-segmented, usually subequal in length and often exceeding the body.

=== Sexual dimorphism and nymph stage ===
Sexual dimorphism is subtle. Females possess an external ovipositor formed by paired gonapophyses of segments VIII and IX, typically elongate and annulated; males lack an ovipositor and may have modified parameres associated with the genital opening on segment IX. Nymphs resemble adults in general form but are smaller and sexually immature, with development proceeding through multiple molts and continued post-imaginal molting.

== Phylogeny ==
The suborder Machilida was formally proposed in a 2018 phylogenetic study by Zhang et al. based on analyses of morphological and molecular data. The study resolved the long-standing phylogenetic relationships within Archaeognatha, recovering Monura (which contains only the extinct family Dasyleptidae) as the sister group to Machilida. The study confirmed the monophyly of Meinertellidae but suggested that the family Machilidae, as traditionally defined, might be paraphyletic with respect to certain "paleo-type" genera.

Fossil evidence from Cretaceous amber (e.g., in Myanmar and Lebanon) indicates that the divergence between the two families is ancient, likely predating the Cretaceous, and suggests a possible Gondwanan origin for Meinertellidae.

== Taxonomy ==
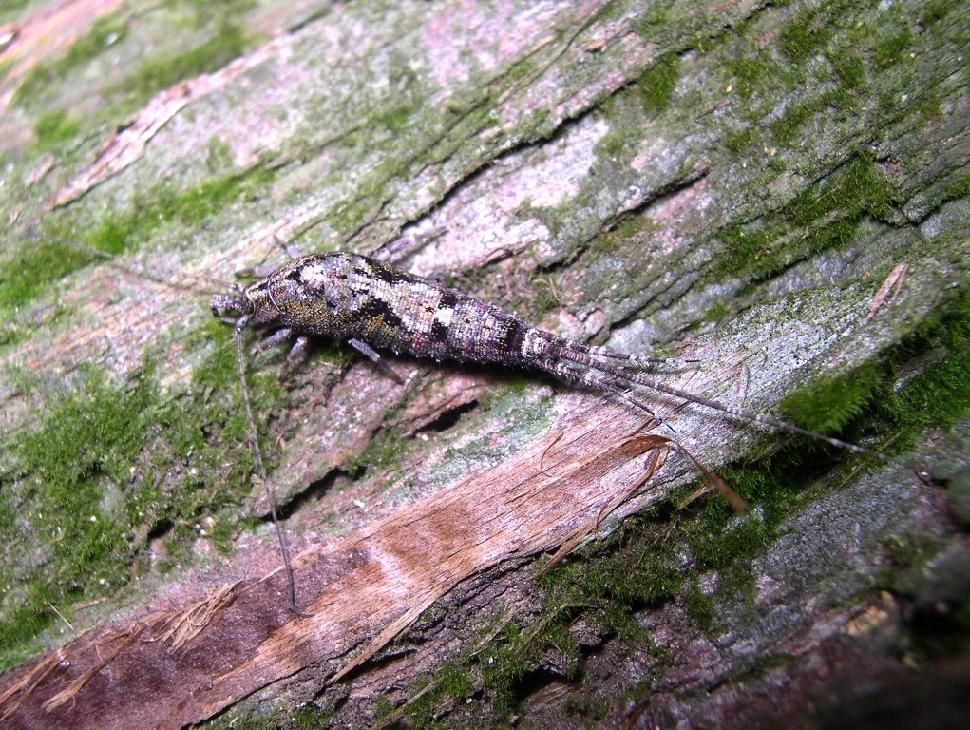
A Machilidae species

- Family Machilidae (Most are restricted to rocky shorelines)
  - Afrochilis Sturm, 2002
  - Afromachilis Mendes, 1981
  - Allopsontus Silvestri, 1911
  - Bachilis Mendes, 1977
  - Catamachilis Silvestri, 1923
  - Charimachilis Wygodzinsky, 1939
  - Coreamachilis Mendes, 1993
  - Corethromachilis Carpenter, 1916
  - Coryphophthalmus Verhoeff, 1910
  - Dilta Strand, 1911
  - †Gigamachilis Montagna, Haug, Strada, Haug, Felber & Tintori, 2017
  - Graphitarsus Silvestri, 1908
  - Haslundichilis Wygodzinsky, 1950
  - Haslundiella Janetschek, 1954
  - Heteropsontus Mendes, 1990
  - Himalayachilis Wygodzinsky, 1952
  - Janetschekilis Wygodzinsky, 1958
  - Lepismachilis Verhoeff, 1910
  - Leptomachilis Sturm, 1991
  - Machilis Latrielle, 1832
  - Machilopsis Olfers, 1907
  - Mendeschilis Gaju, Mora, Molero & Bach, 2000
  - Mesomachilis Silvestri, 1911
  - Metagraphitarsus Paclt, 1969
  - Metamachilis Silvestri, 1936
  - Meximachilis Wygodzinsky, 1945
  - Neomachilis Silvestri, 1911
  - †Onychomachilis Pierce, 1951
  - Paramachilis Wygodzinsky, 1941
  - Parapetrobius Mendes, 1980
  - Pedetontinus Silvestri, 1943
  - Pedetontoides Mendes, 1981
  - Pedetontus Silvestri, 1911
  - Petridiobius Paclt, 1970
  - Petrobiellus Silvestri, 1943
  - Petrobius Leach, 1817
  - Praemachilis Silvestri, 1904
  - Praemachiloides Janetschek, 1954
  - Praetrigoniophthalmus Janetschek, 1954
  - Promesomachilis Silvestri, 1923
  - Pseudocatamachilis Gaju & Bach, 1991
  - Pseudomachilanus Paclt, 1969
  - Silvestrichilis Wygodzinsky, 1950
  - Silvestrichiloides Mendes, 1990
  - Stachilis Janetschek, 1957
  - Trigoniomachilis Stach, 1937
  - Trigoniophthalmus Verhoeff, 1910
  - Wygodzinskilis Janetschek, 1954

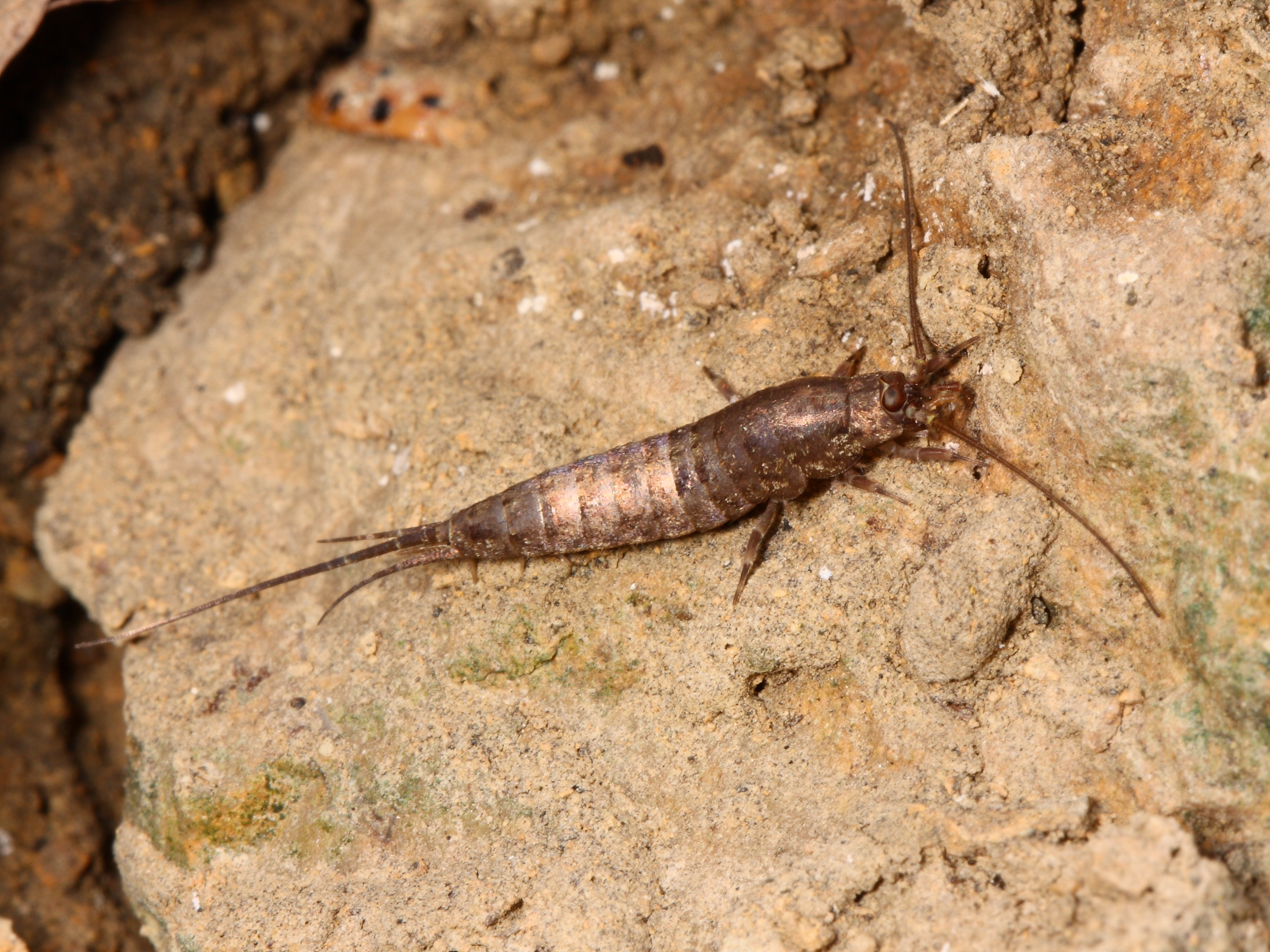
A Meinertellidae species

- Family Meinertellidae (Lack scales at base of hind legs and antennae)
  - Hypomachilodes Silvestri, 1911
  - Machilinus Silvestri, 1905
  - Machiloides Silvestri, 1904
  - Meinertellus Silvestri, 1911
  - Machilontus Silvestri, 1911
  - Macropsontus Silvestri, 1911
  - Machilellus Silvestri, 1910
  - Machilelloides Sturm & Smith, 1993

== Distribution and habitat ==
The two families within Machilida have contrasting modern distributions. Machilidae are predominantly found in the Northern Hemisphere, while Meinertellidae are largely distributed across much of the world.
