= Meximachilis dampfi =

Scientific classification
- Kingdom: Animalia
- Phylum: Arthropoda
- Clade: Pancrustacea
- Class: Insecta
- Order: Archaeognatha
- Family: Machilidae
- Genus: Meximachilis
- Species: M. dampfi

Binomial name
- Meximachilis dampfi Wygodzinsky, 1946

Species of archaeognatha

Meximachilis dampfi is a species in the genus Meximachilis of the family Machilidae which belongs to the insect order Archaeognatha (jumping bristletails)
