= Pedetontus calcaratus =

Scientific classification
- Kingdom: Animalia
- Phylum: Arthropoda
- Clade: Pancrustacea
- Class: Insecta
- Order: Archaeognatha
- Family: Machilidae
- Genus: Pedetontus
- Species: P. calcaratus

Binomial name
- Pedetontus calcaratus (Silvestri, 1911)

Species of archaeognatha

Pedetontus calcaratus is a species in the genus Pedetontus of the family Machilidae which belongs to the insect order Archaeognatha (jumping bristletails).
