= Petrobiellus kusakini =

Scientific classification
- Kingdom: Animalia
- Phylum: Arthropoda
- Clade: Pancrustacea
- Class: Insecta
- Order: Archaeognatha
- Family: Machilidae
- Genus: Petrobiellus
- Species: P. kusakini

Binomial name
- Petrobiellus kusakini Kaplin, 1980

Species of archaeognatha

Petrobiellus kusakini is a species in the genus Petrobiellus of the family Machilidae which belongs to the insect order Archaeognatha (jumping bristletails).
