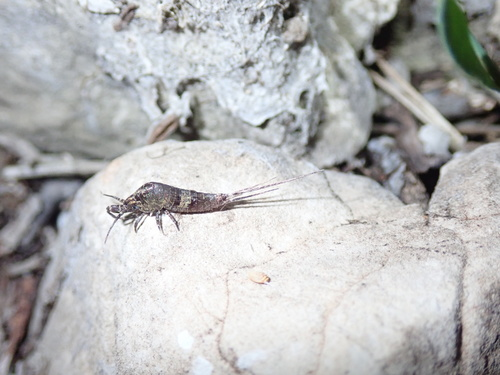

Scientific classification
- Kingdom: Animalia
- Phylum: Arthropoda
- Clade: Pancrustacea
- Class: Insecta
- Order: Archaeognatha
- Family: Machilidae
- Genus: Praemachilis
- Species: P. excelsior

Binomial name
- Praemachilis excelsior Silvestri, 1904

= Praemachilis excelsior =

Species of jumping bristletail

Praemachilis excelsior is a species of jumping bristletail in the genus Praemachilis.
