= Haslundichilis afghani =

Scientific classification
- Kingdom: Animalia
- Phylum: Arthropoda
- Clade: Pancrustacea
- Class: Insecta
- Order: Archaeognatha
- Family: Machilidae
- Genus: Haslundichilis
- Species: H. afghani

Binomial name
- Haslundichilis afghani Wygodzinsky, 1950

Species of archaeognatha

Haslundichilis afghani is a species in the genus Haslundichilis of the family Machilidae which belongs to the insect order Archaeognatha (jumping bristletails).
