= Praetrigoniophthalmus kuhnelti =

Scientific classification
- Kingdom: Animalia
- Phylum: Arthropoda
- Clade: Pancrustacea
- Class: Insecta
- Order: Archaeognatha
- Family: Machilidae
- Genus: Praetrigoniophthalmus
- Species: P. kuhnelti

Binomial name
- Praetrigoniophthalmus kuhnelti Janetschek, 1954

Species of archaeognatha

Praetrigoniophthalmus kuhnelti is a species in the genus Praetrigoniophthalmus of the family Machilidae which belongs to the insect order Archaeognatha (jumping bristletails).
