= Promesomachilis hispanica =

Scientific classification
- Kingdom: Animalia
- Phylum: Arthropoda
- Clade: Pancrustacea
- Class: Insecta
- Order: Archaeognatha
- Family: Machilidae
- Genus: Promesomachilis
- Species: P. hispanica

Binomial name
- Promesomachilis hispanica Silvestri, 1923

Species of archaeognatha

Promesomachilis hispanica is a species in the genus Promesomachilis of the family Machilidae which belongs to the insect order Archaeognatha (jumping bristletails).
