= Petrobiellus takunagae =

Scientific classification
- Kingdom: Animalia
- Phylum: Arthropoda
- Clade: Pancrustacea
- Class: Insecta
- Order: Archaeognatha
- Family: Machilidae
- Genus: Petrobiellus
- Species: P. takunagae

Binomial name
- Petrobiellus takunagae Silvestri, 1943

Species of archaeognatha

Petrobiellus takunagae is a species in the genus Petrobiellus of the family Machilidae which belongs to the insect order Archaeognatha (jumping bristletails).
