= Trigoniomachilis saovensis =

Scientific classification
- Kingdom: Animalia
- Phylum: Arthropoda
- Clade: Pancrustacea
- Class: Insecta
- Order: Archaeognatha
- Family: Machilidae
- Genus: Trigoniomachilis
- Species: T. saovensis

Binomial name
- Trigoniomachilis saovensis Bach, 1982

Species of archaeognatha

Trigoniomachilis saovensis is a species in the genus Trigoniomachilis of the family Machilidae which belongs to the insect order Archaeognatha (jumping bristletails).
