= Praemachiloides janetscheki =

Scientific classification
- Kingdom: Animalia
- Phylum: Arthropoda
- Clade: Pancrustacea
- Class: Insecta
- Order: Archaeognatha
- Family: Machilidae
- Genus: Praemachiloides
- Species: P. janetscheki

Binomial name
- Praemachiloides janetscheki Bach, 1978

Species of archaeognatha

Praemachiloides janetscheki is a species in the genus Praemachiloides of the family Machilidae which belongs to the insect order Archaeognatha (jumping bristletails).
