= Parateutonia =

Scientific classification
- Kingdom: Animalia
- Phylum: Arthropoda
- Clade: Pancrustacea
- Class: Insecta
- Order: Archaeognatha
- Family: Machilidae
- Genus: Parateutonia; Verhoeff, 1910

Genus of jumping bristletails

Parateutonia is a genus of jumping bristletails in the family Machilidae.
