= Silvestrichiloides beckeri =

Scientific classification
- Kingdom: Animalia
- Phylum: Arthropoda
- Clade: Pancrustacea
- Class: Insecta
- Order: Archaeognatha
- Family: Machilidae
- Genus: Silvestrichiloides
- Species: S. beckeri

Binomial name
- Silvestrichiloides beckeri (Paclt, 1960)

Species of archaeognatha

Silvestrichiloides beckeri is a species in the genus Silvestrichiloides of the family Machilidae which belongs to the insect order Archaeognatha (jumping bristletails).
