= Paramachilis rifensis =

Scientific classification
- Kingdom: Animalia
- Phylum: Arthropoda
- Clade: Pancrustacea
- Class: Insecta
- Order: Archaeognatha
- Family: Machilidae
- Genus: Paramachilis
- Species: P. rifensis

Binomial name
- Paramachilis rifensis Bitsch, 1966

Species of archaeognatha

Paramachilis rifensis is a species in the genus Paramachilis of the family Machilidae which belongs to the insect order Archaeognatha (jumping bristletails)
