= Paramachilis acuminothorax =

Scientific classification
- Kingdom: Animalia
- Phylum: Arthropoda
- Clade: Pancrustacea
- Class: Insecta
- Order: Archaeognatha
- Family: Machilidae
- Genus: Paramachilis
- Species: P. acuminothorax

Binomial name
- Paramachilis acuminothorax (Lucas, 1846)

Synonyms
- Machilis acuminithorax Lucas, 1846

Species of archaeognatha

Paramachilis acuminothorax is a species of jumping bristletail in the genus Paramachilis of the family Machilidae which belongs to the insect order Archaeognatha (jumping bristletails). It was originally described from Algeria by Hippolyte Lucas in 1846.

== Taxonomy ==
The species was first described as Machilis acuminithorax by Lucas in 1846 in the zoological volume of Exploration scientifique de l’Algérie.

The original spelling acuminithorax has been corrected to acuminothorax.

The species was later transferred to the genus Paramachilis following revisions of the family Machilidae.

== Type material ==
The type material was collected in Algeria during the French scientific expedition of 1840–1842.

== Diagnosis ==
The species belongs to the Paramachilis group of Machilidae characterized by elongate, scaled bodies and well-developed abdominal appendages. Based on the comparative treatment of Machilidae by Silvestri (1906), diagnostic features include:

- a distinctly acuminate (pointed) pronotum;
- large, contiguous compound eyes;
- elongate maxillary palps;
- well-developed abdominal styli;
- long cerci and median filament.

These features distinguish the species from typical members of Machilis and support its placement in Paramachilis.

== Distribution ==
The species is known from North Africa, with its type locality in Algeria.
