= Promesomachilis cazorlensis =

Scientific classification
- Kingdom: Animalia
- Phylum: Arthropoda
- Clade: Pancrustacea
- Class: Insecta
- Order: Archaeognatha
- Family: Machilidae
- Genus: Promesomachilis
- Species: P. cazorlensis

Binomial name
- Promesomachilis cazorlensis Bach, 1984

Species of archaeognatha

Promesomachilis cazorlensis is a species in the genus Promesomachilis of the family Machilidae which belongs to the insect order Archaeognatha (jumping bristletails).
