= Allopsontus oubehi =

Scientific classification
- Kingdom: Animalia
- Phylum: Arthropoda
- Clade: Pancrustacea
- Class: Insecta
- Order: Archaeognatha
- Family: Machilidae
- Genus: Allopsontus
- Species: A. oubehi

Binomial name
- Allopsontus oubehi Bitsch, 1968

Species of archaeognatha

Allopsontus oubehi is a species in the genus Allopsontus of the family Machilidae which belongs to the insect order Archaeognatha (jumping bristletails).
