= Janetschekilis africanus =

Scientific classification
- Kingdom: Animalia
- Phylum: Arthropoda
- Clade: Pancrustacea
- Class: Insecta
- Order: Archaeognatha
- Family: Machilidae
- Genus: Janetschekilis
- Species: J. africanus

Binomial name
- Janetschekilis africanus (Brown, 1926)

Synonyms
- Machilis africanus Brown, 1926

Species of archaeognatha

Janetschekilis africanus is a species in the genus Janetschekilis of the family Machilidae which belongs to the insect order Archaeognatha (jumping bristletails).
