= Paramachilis paucispina =

Scientific classification
- Kingdom: Animalia
- Phylum: Arthropoda
- Clade: Pancrustacea
- Class: Insecta
- Order: Archaeognatha
- Family: Machilidae
- Genus: Paramachilis
- Species: P. paucispina

Binomial name
- Paramachilis paucispina Janetschek, 1954

Species of archaeognatha

Paramachilis paucispina is a species in the genus Paramachilis of the family Machilidae which belongs to the insect order Archaeognatha (jumping bristletails)
