= Parapetrobius azoricus =

Conservation status
- Vulnerable (IUCN 3.1)

Scientific classification
- Kingdom: Animalia
- Phylum: Arthropoda
- Clade: Pancrustacea
- Class: Insecta
- Order: Archaeognatha
- Family: Machilidae
- Genus: Parapetrobius
- Species: P. azoricus

Binomial name
- Parapetrobius azoricus Mendes, 1980

Species of jumping bristletail

Parapetrobius azoricus is a species of jumping bristletails, in the family Machilidae, that inhabits the Azores. It is the only species in Parapetrobius.

The species were first identified by Portuguese entomologist, Luis Fernando Marques Mendes in 1980, on the Formigas Islets, a group of small rocky outcrops in the eastern group of the Azores archipelago. The species were also subsequently found in the Lajes coastal area on Pico Island.
