= Corethromachilis brevipalpis =

Scientific classification
- Kingdom: Animalia
- Phylum: Arthropoda
- Clade: Pancrustacea
- Class: Insecta
- Order: Archaeognatha
- Family: Machilidae
- Genus: Corethromachilis
- Species: C. brevipalpis

Binomial name
- Corethromachilis brevipalpis Carpenter, 1916

Species of archaeognatha

Corethromachilis brevipalpis is a species in the genus Corethromachilis of the family Machilidae which belongs to the insect order Archaeognatha (jumping bristletails).
