= Praemachiloides trispina =

Scientific classification
- Kingdom: Animalia
- Phylum: Arthropoda
- Clade: Pancrustacea
- Class: Insecta
- Order: Archaeognatha
- Family: Machilidae
- Genus: Praemachiloides
- Species: P. trispina

Binomial name
- Praemachiloides trispina Janetschek, 1954

Species of archaeognatha

Praemachiloides trispina is a species in the genus Praemachiloides of the family Machilidae which belongs to the insect order Archaeognatha (jumping bristletails).
