= Coryphophthalmus imitator =

Scientific classification
- Kingdom: Animalia
- Phylum: Arthropoda
- Clade: Pancrustacea
- Class: Insecta
- Order: Archaeognatha
- Family: Machilidae
- Genus: Coryphophthalmus
- Species: C. imitator

Binomial name
- Coryphophthalmus imitator Wygodzinsky, 1958

Species of jumping bristletails

Coryphophthalmus imitator is a species from the genus Coryphophthalmus which are jumping bristletails in the family Machilidae.
