= Allopsontus spinosissimus =

Scientific classification
- Kingdom: Animalia
- Phylum: Arthropoda
- Clade: Pancrustacea
- Class: Insecta
- Order: Archaeognatha
- Family: Machilidae
- Genus: Allopsontus
- Species: A. spinosissimus

Binomial name
- Allopsontus spinosissimus Mendes, 1981

Species of archaeognatha

Allopsontus spinosissimus is a species in the genus Allopsontus of the family Machilidae which belongs to the insect order Archaeognatha (jumping bristletails).Allopsontus spinosissimus is a species in the genus Allopsontus of the family Machilidae which belongs to the insect order Archaeognatha (jumping bristletails). It has been recorded in the mountains of northern Iran at elevations of 3,800–4,000 metres.
