= Pedetontus submutans =

Scientific classification
- Kingdom: Animalia
- Phylum: Arthropoda
- Clade: Pancrustacea
- Class: Insecta
- Order: Archaeognatha
- Family: Machilidae
- Genus: Pedetontus
- Species: P. submutans

Binomial name
- Pedetontus submutans (Silvestri, 1911)

Species of jumping bristletail

Pedetontus submutans is a species of jumping bristletail in the family Machilidae. It is found in North America.
