= Catamachilis amara =

Scientific classification
- Kingdom: Animalia
- Phylum: Arthropoda
- Clade: Pancrustacea
- Class: Insecta
- Order: Archaeognatha
- Family: Machilidae
- Genus: Catamachilis
- Species: C. amara

Binomial name
- Catamachilis amara Janetschek, 1954

Species of jumping bristletail

Catamachilis amara is a species of jumping bristletail in the family Machilidae.
