= Silvestrichiloides gussakovskii =

Scientific classification
- Kingdom: Animalia
- Phylum: Arthropoda
- Clade: Pancrustacea
- Class: Insecta
- Order: Archaeognatha
- Family: Machilidae
- Genus: Silvestrichiloides
- Species: S. gussakovskii

Binomial name
- Silvestrichiloides gussakovskii (Kaplin, 1982)

Species of archaeognatha

Silvestrichiloides gussakovskii is a species in the genus Silvestrichiloides of the family Machilidae which belongs to the insect order Archaeognatha (jumping bristletails).
