= Catamachilis constricta =

Scientific classification
- Kingdom: Animalia
- Phylum: Arthropoda
- Clade: Pancrustacea
- Class: Insecta
- Order: Archaeognatha
- Family: Machilidae
- Genus: Catamachilis
- Species: C. constricta

Binomial name
- Catamachilis constricta (Navas, 1905)

Synonyms
- Machilis constricta Navas, 1905

Species of jumping bristletail

Catamachilis constricta is a species of jumping bristletail in the family Machilidae.
