= Silvestrichilis polyacantha =

Scientific classification
- Kingdom: Animalia
- Phylum: Arthropoda
- Clade: Pancrustacea
- Class: Insecta
- Order: Archaeognatha
- Family: Machilidae
- Genus: Silvestrichilis
- Species: S. polyacantha

Binomial name
- Silvestrichilis polyacantha Janetschek, 1959

Species of archaeognatha

Silvestrichilis polyacantha is a species in the genus Silvestrichilis of the family Machilidae which belongs to the insect order Archaeognatha (jumping bristletails).
