= Praetrigoniophthalmus meticulosa =

Scientific classification
- Kingdom: Animalia
- Phylum: Arthropoda
- Clade: Pancrustacea
- Class: Insecta
- Order: Archaeognatha
- Family: Machilidae
- Genus: Praetrigoniophthalmus
- Species: P. meticulosa

Binomial name
- Praetrigoniophthalmus meticulosa (Silvestri, 1904)

Species of archaeognatha

Praetrigoniophthalmus meticulosa is a species in the genus Praetrigoniophthalmus of the family Machilidae which belongs to the insect order Archaeognatha (jumping bristletails).
