= Stachilis drenowskii =

Scientific classification
- Kingdom: Animalia
- Phylum: Arthropoda
- Clade: Pancrustacea
- Class: Insecta
- Order: Archaeognatha
- Family: Machilidae
- Genus: Stachilis
- Species: S. drenowskii

Binomial name
- Stachilis drenowskii (Stach, 1958)

Species of archaeognatha

Stachilis drenowskii is a species in the genus Stachilis of the family Machilidae which belongs to the insect order Archaeognatha (jumping bristletails).
