= Meximachilis cockendolpheri =

Scientific classification
- Kingdom: Animalia
- Phylum: Arthropoda
- Clade: Pancrustacea
- Class: Insecta
- Order: Archaeognatha
- Family: Machilidae
- Genus: Meximachilis
- Species: M. cockendolpheri

Binomial name
- Meximachilis cockendolpheri Kaplin, 1994

Species of archaeognatha

Meximachilis cockendolpheri is a species in the genus Meximachilis of the family Machilidae which belongs to the insect order Archaeognatha (jumping bristletails)
