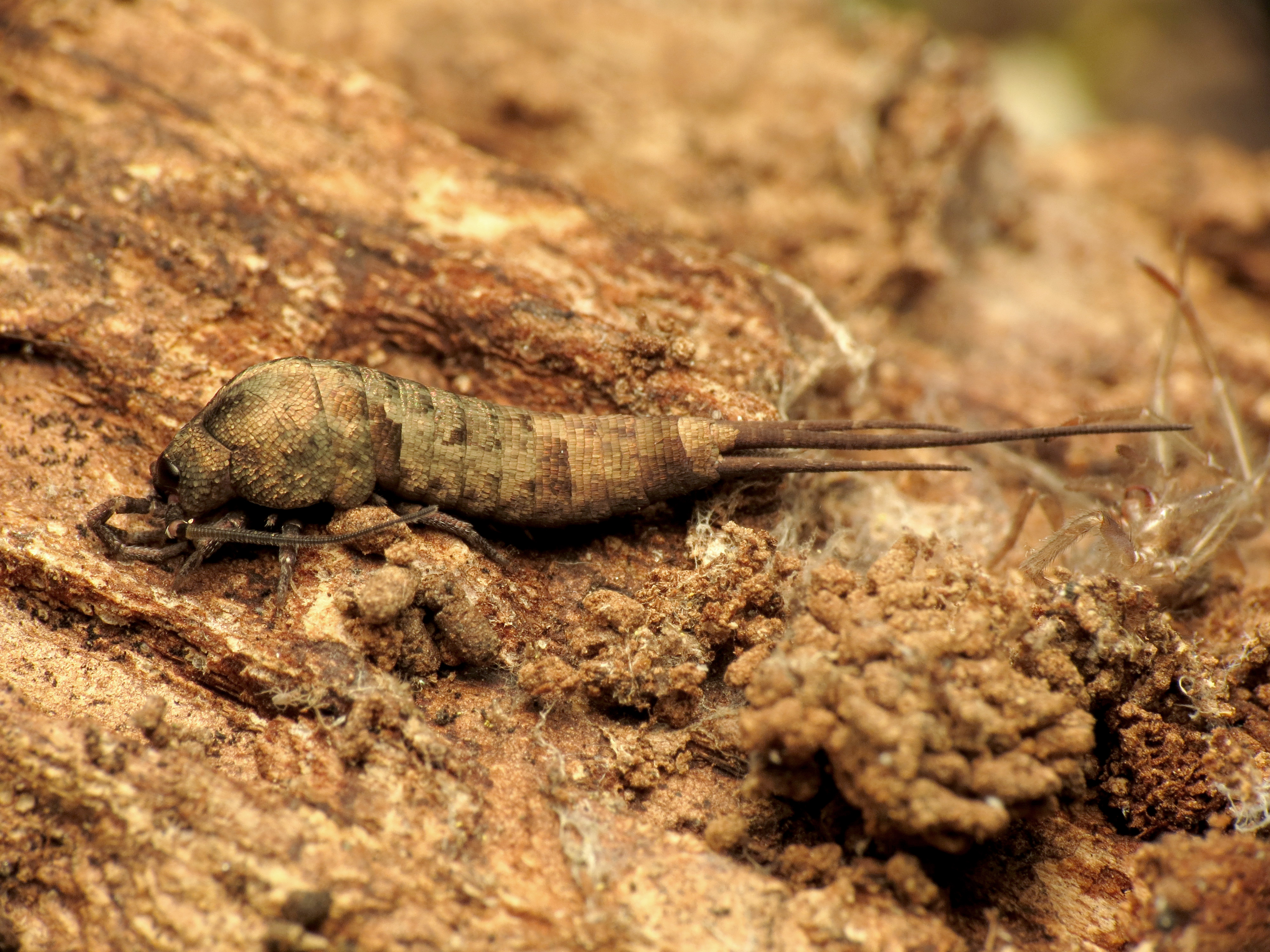

Scientific classification
- Kingdom: Animalia
- Phylum: Arthropoda
- Clade: Pancrustacea
- Class: Insecta
- Order: Archaeognatha
- Family: Machilidae
- Genus: Pedetontus
- Species: P. saltator

Binomial name
- Pedetontus saltator Wygodzinsky & Schmidt, 1980

= Pedetontus saltator =

Species of jumping bristletail

Pedetontus saltator, the jumping bristletail, is a species of jumping bristletail in the family Machilidae. It is found in North America.
