= Trigoniomachilis urumovi =

Scientific classification
- Kingdom: Animalia
- Phylum: Arthropoda
- Clade: Pancrustacea
- Class: Insecta
- Order: Archaeognatha
- Family: Machilidae
- Genus: Trigoniomachilis
- Species: T. urumovi

Binomial name
- Trigoniomachilis urumovi Stach, 1937

Species of archaeognatha

Trigoniomachilis urumovi is a species in the genus Trigoniomachilis of the family Machilidae which belongs to the insect order Archaeognatha (jumping bristletails).
