= Pedetontinus luanchuanensis =

Scientific classification
- Kingdom: Animalia
- Phylum: Arthropoda
- Clade: Pancrustacea
- Class: Insecta
- Order: Archaeognatha
- Family: Machilidae
- Genus: Pedetontinus
- Species: P. luanchuanensis

Binomial name
- Pedetontinus luanchuanensis Kaplin, 2011

Species of archaeognatha

Pedetontinus luanchuanensis is a species in the genus Pedetontinus of the family Machilidae which belongs to the insect order Archaeognatha (jumping bristletails)
