= Meximachilis tuxeni =

Scientific classification
- Kingdom: Animalia
- Phylum: Arthropoda
- Clade: Pancrustacea
- Class: Insecta
- Order: Archaeognatha
- Family: Machilidae
- Genus: Meximachilis
- Species: M. tuxeni

Binomial name
- Meximachilis tuxeni Sturm, 1991

Species of archaeognatha

Meximachilis tuxeni is a species in the genus Meximachilis of the family Machilidae which belongs to the insect order Archaeognatha (jumping bristletails)
