= Allopsontus kerzhneri =

Scientific classification
- Kingdom: Animalia
- Phylum: Arthropoda
- Clade: Pancrustacea
- Class: Insecta
- Order: Archaeognatha
- Family: Machilidae
- Genus: Allopsontus
- Species: A. kerzhneri

Binomial name
- Allopsontus kerzhneri Kaplin, 1982

Species of archaeognatha

Allopsontus kerzhneri is a species in the genus Allopsontus of the family Machilidae which belongs to the insect order Archaeognatha (jumping bristletails).
