= Praemachiloides iberica =

Scientific classification
- Kingdom: Animalia
- Phylum: Arthropoda
- Clade: Pancrustacea
- Class: Insecta
- Order: Archaeognatha
- Family: Machilidae
- Genus: Praemachiloides
- Species: P. iberica

Binomial name
- Praemachiloides iberica Mora, Gaju & Bach, 2000

Species of archaeognatha

Praemachiloides iberica is a species in the genus Praemachiloides of the family Machilidae which belongs to the insect order Archaeognatha (jumping bristletails).

Male P. iberica have plaited setae located on their maxillary palp, which differentiates them from other Praemachiloides species.
