= Parapetrobius =

Scientific classification
- Kingdom: Animalia
- Phylum: Arthropoda
- Clade: Pancrustacea
- Class: Insecta
- Order: Archaeognatha
- Family: Machilidae
- Genus: Parapetrobius; Mendes, 1980
- Species: P. azoricus

Binomial name
- Parapetrobius azoricus Mendes, 1980

Genus of jumping bristletails

Parapetrobius is a genus of jumping bristletails in the family Machilidae. Currently, there is one described species, Parapetrobius azoricus, which has only been found on Pico Island and the Formigas Islets in the archipelago of the Azores
