= Stachilis =

Scientific classification
- Kingdom: Animalia
- Phylum: Arthropoda
- Clade: Pancrustacea
- Class: Insecta
- Order: Archaeognatha
- Family: Machilidae
- Genus: Stachilis; Janetschek, 1957

Genus of jumping bristletails

Stachilis is a genus of jumping bristletails in the family Machilidae. There are at least three described species in Stachilis.

== Species ==
These three species belong to the genus Stachilis:

- Stachilis catamachilideus (Stach, 1958)
- Stachilis drenowskii (Stach, 1958)
- Stachilis pectinata Janetschek, 1957
