= Silvestrichilis =

Scientific classification
- Kingdom: Animalia
- Phylum: Arthropoda
- Clade: Pancrustacea
- Class: Insecta
- Order: Archaeognatha
- Family: Machilidae
- Genus: Silvestrichilis; Wygodzinsky, 1950

Genus of jumping bristletails

Silvestrichilis is a genus of jumping bristletails in the family Machilidae. There are about eight described species in Silvestrichilis.

== Species ==
These eight species belong to the genus Silvestrichilis:

- Silvestrichilis cercoconicus Bach, 1979
- Silvestrichilis chinensis Kaplin, 2019
- Silvestrichilis heterotarsus (Silvestri, 1942)
- Silvestrichilis macedonica (Stach, 1937)
- Silvestrichilis polyacantha Janetschek, 1959
- Silvestrichilis trispina (Wygodzinsky, 1939)
- Silvestrichilis tuzeti Janetschek, 1955
- Silvestrichilis uncinata Janetschek, 1957
