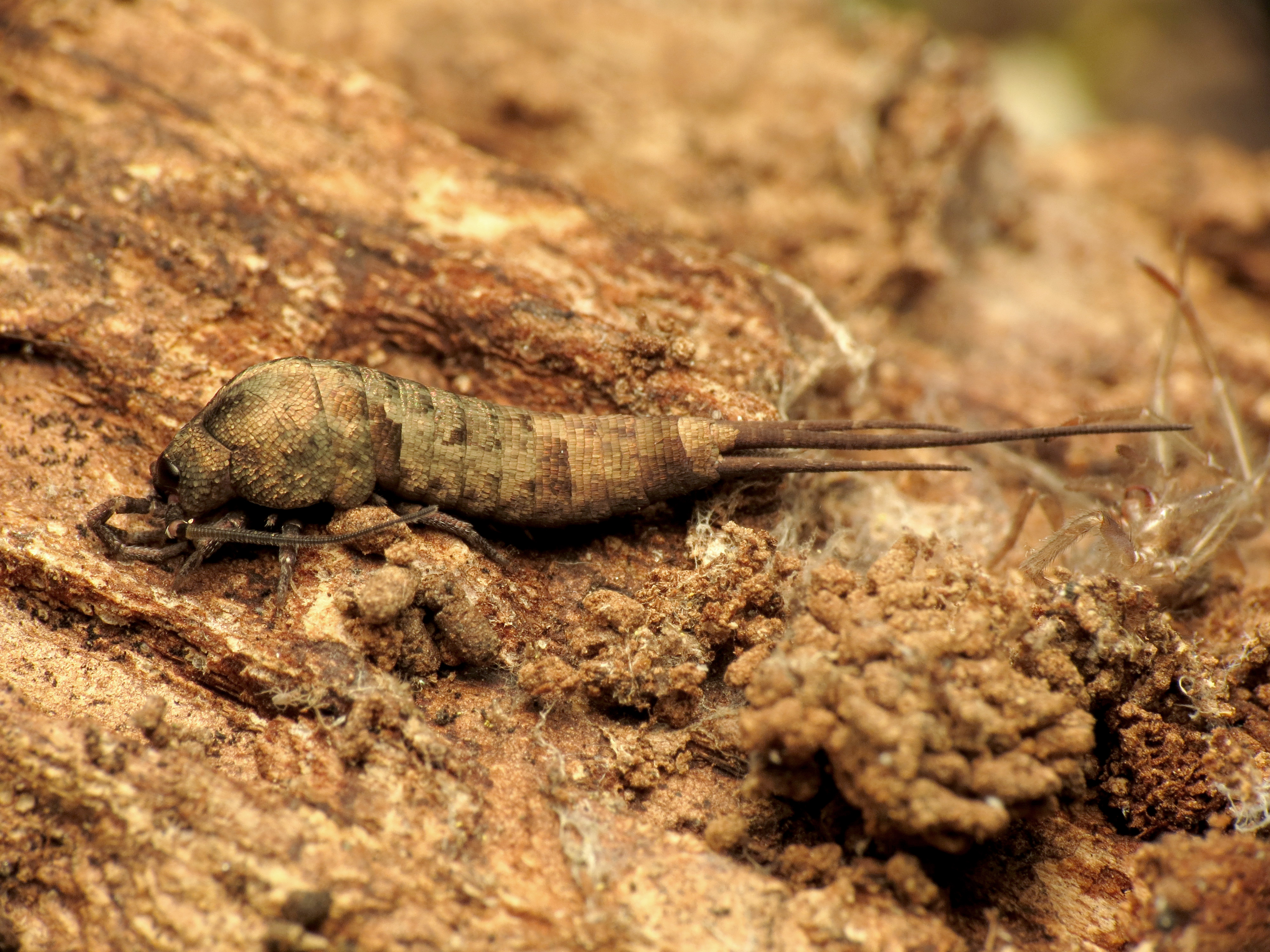
- Pedetontus saltator

Scientific classification
- Kingdom: Animalia
- Phylum: Arthropoda
- Clade: Pancrustacea
- Class: Insecta
- Order: Archaeognatha
- Family: Machilidae
- Subfamily: Petrobiinae
- Genus: Pedetontus; Silvestri, 1911

= Pedetontus =

Genus of jumping bristletails

Pedetontus is a genus of jumping bristletails in the family Machilidae. There are about 10 described species in Pedetontus.

== Species ==
- Pedetontus calcaratus (Silvestri, 1911)
- Pedetontus californicus (Silvestri, 1911)
- Pedetontus gershneri Allen, 1995
- Pedetontus palaearcticus Silvestri, 1925
- Pedetontus persquamosus (Silvestri, 1911)
- Pedetontus saltator Wygodzinsky & Schmidt, 1980
- Pedetontus schicki Sturm, 2001
- Pedetontus submutans (Silvestri, 1911)
- Pedetontus superior (Silvestri, 1911)
- Pedetontus yosemite Sturm, 2001
- Pedetontus unimaculatus Machida, 1980
