= Janetschekilis =

Scientific classification
- Kingdom: Animalia
- Phylum: Arthropoda
- Clade: Pancrustacea
- Class: Insecta
- Order: Archaeognatha
- Family: Machilidae
- Genus: Janetschekilis; Wygodzinsky, 1958

Genus of jumping bristletails

Janetschekilis is a genus of jumping bristletails in the family Machilidae.

== Species ==
- Janetschekilis africanus (Brown, 1926)
- Janetschekilis dolichopsis (Silvestri, 1908)
- Janetschekilis grandipalpus (Silvestri, 1908)
- Janetschekilis perrieri (Silvestri, 1907)
- Janetschekilis palpispina Mendes, 1992
- Janetschekilis prima Wygodzinsky, 1958
- Janetschekilis secunda Wygodzinsky, 1958
