= Wygodzinskilis =

Scientific classification
- Kingdom: Animalia
- Phylum: Arthropoda
- Clade: Pancrustacea
- Class: Insecta
- Order: Archaeognatha
- Family: Machilidae
- Genus: Wygodzinskilis; Janetschek, 1954
- Species: W. klinocellata

Binomial name
- Wygodzinskilis klinocellata Janetschek, 1954

Genus of jumping bristletails

Wygodzinskilis is a genus of jumping bristletails in the family Machilidae. There is at least one described species in Wygodzinskilis, W. klinocellata.
