= Pseudomachilanus =

Scientific classification
- Kingdom: Animalia
- Phylum: Arthropoda
- Clade: Pancrustacea
- Class: Insecta
- Order: Archaeognatha
- Family: Machilidae
- Genus: Pseudomachilanus; Paclt, 1969

Genus of jumping bristletails

Pseudomachilanus is a genus of jumping bristletails in the family Machilidae. The genus contains only one species, Pseudomachilanus sechellarum.
