= Praemachiloides =

Scientific classification
- Kingdom: Animalia
- Phylum: Arthropoda
- Clade: Pancrustacea
- Class: Insecta
- Order: Archaeognatha
- Family: Machilidae
- Genus: Praemachiloides; Janetschek, 1954

Genus of jumping bristletails

Praemachiloides is a genus of jumping bristletails in the family Machilidae. There are about five described species in Praemachiloides.

== Species ==
These five species belong to the genus Praemachiloides:

- Praemachiloides autunnalis Gaju, Bach, Mora & Molero, 1995
- Praemachiloides iberica Mora, Gaju & Bach, 2000
- Praemachiloides insularis Gaju, Bach, Molero & Mora, 1995
- Praemachiloides janetscheki Bach, 1978
- Praemachiloides trispina Janetschek, 1954
