= Pedetontinus =

Scientific classification
- Kingdom: Animalia
- Phylum: Arthropoda
- Clade: Pancrustacea
- Class: Insecta
- Order: Archaeognatha
- Family: Machilidae
- Genus: Pedetontinus; Silvestri, 1943

Genus of jumping bristletails

Pedetontinus is a genus of jumping bristletails in the family Machilidae. There are at least twelve described species in Pedetontinus.

== Species ==
These twelve species belong to the genus Pedetontinus:

- Pedetontinus atlanticus
- Pedetontinus aureus
- Pedetontinus dicroceros
- Pedetontinus esakii
- Pedetontinus ishii
- Pedetontinus kuvanae
- Pedetontinus luanchuanensis
- Pedetontinus rhombeus
- Pedetontinus tianmuensis
- Pedetontinus yinae
- Pedetontinus yosii
