= Leptomachilis =

Scientific classification
- Kingdom: Animalia
- Phylum: Arthropoda
- Clade: Pancrustacea
- Class: Insecta
- Order: Archaeognatha
- Family: Machilidae
- Genus: Leptomachilis; Sturm, 1991-12
- Species: L. californica

Binomial name
- Leptomachilis californica Sturm, 1991

Genus of jumping bristletails

Leptomachilis is a genus of jumping bristletails in the family Machilidae. There is one described species in Leptomachilis, L. californica.
