= Petrobiellus =

Scientific classification
- Kingdom: Animalia
- Phylum: Arthropoda
- Clade: Pancrustacea
- Class: Insecta
- Order: Archaeognatha
- Family: Machilidae
- Genus: Petrobiellus; Silvestri, 1943

Genus of jumping bristletails

Petrobiellus is a genus of jumping bristletails in the family Machilidae.

== Species ==
- Petrobiellus kusakini
- Petrobiellus takunagae
