= Bachilis =

Scientific classification
- Kingdom: Animalia
- Phylum: Arthropoda
- Clade: Pancrustacea
- Class: Insecta
- Order: Archaeognatha
- Family: Machilidae
- Genus: Bachilis; Mendes, 1977
- Species: B. multisetosa

Binomial name
- Bachilis multisetosa Mendes, 1977

Genus of archaeognatha

Bachilis multisetosa is the only species in the genus Bachilis of the family Machilidae which belongs to the insect order Archaeognatha (jumping bristletails).
