= Corethromachilis =

Scientific classification
- Kingdom: Animalia
- Phylum: Arthropoda
- Clade: Pancrustacea
- Class: Insecta
- Order: Archaeognatha
- Family: Machilidae
- Genus: Corethromachilis; Carpenter, 1916

Genus of jumping bristletails

Corethromachilis is a genus of jumping bristletails in the family Machilidae.

== Species ==
There are two species:

- Corethromachilis brevipalpis Carpenter, 1916
- Corethromachilis gardineri Carpenter, 1916
