= Neomachilis =

Scientific classification
- Kingdom: Animalia
- Phylum: Arthropoda
- Clade: Pancrustacea
- Class: Insecta
- Order: Archaeognatha
- Family: Machilidae
- Genus: Neomachilis; Silvestri, 1911
- Species: N. halophila

Binomial name
- Neomachilis halophila Silvestri, 1911

Genus of jumping bristletails

Neomachilis is a genus of jumping bristletails in the family Machilidae. There is one described species in Neomachilis, N. halophila.
