= Himalayachilis =

Scientific classification
- Kingdom: Animalia
- Phylum: Arthropoda
- Clade: Pancrustacea
- Class: Insecta
- Order: Archaeognatha
- Family: Machilidae
- Genus: Himalayachilis; Wygodzinsky, 1952

Genus of jumping bristletails

Himalayachilis is a genus of jumping bristletails in the family Machilidae. It contains only one species Himalayachilis murreensis.
