= Pedetontoides =

Scientific classification
- Kingdom: Animalia
- Phylum: Arthropoda
- Clade: Pancrustacea
- Class: Insecta
- Order: Archaeognatha
- Family: Machilidae
- Genus: Pedetontoides; Mendes, 1981
- Species: P. atlanticus

Binomial name
- Pedetontoides atlanticus Mendes, 1981

Genus of jumping bristletails

Pedetontoides is a genus of jumping bristletails in the family Machilidae. There is one described species in Pedetontoides, P. atlanticus.
