= Pseudocatamachilis =

Scientific classification
- Kingdom: Animalia
- Phylum: Arthropoda
- Clade: Pancrustacea
- Class: Insecta
- Order: Archaeognatha
- Family: Machilidae
- Genus: Pseudocatamachilis; Gaju & Bach, 1991
- Species: P. torquata

Binomial name
- Pseudocatamachilis torquata (Navas, 1905)

Genus of jumping bristletails

Pseudocatamachilis is a genus of jumping bristletails in the family Machilidae. There is at least one described species in Pseudocatamachilis, P. torquata.
