= Promesomachilis =

Scientific classification
- Kingdom: Animalia
- Phylum: Arthropoda
- Clade: Pancrustacea
- Class: Insecta
- Order: Archaeognatha
- Family: Machilidae
- Genus: Promesomachilis; Silvestri, 1923

Genus of jumping bristletails

Promesomachilis is a genus of jumping bristletails in the family Machilidae. There are at least two described species in Promesomachilis.

== Species ==
These two species belong to the genus Promesomachilis:

- Promesomachilis cazorlensis Bach, 1984
- Promesomachilis hispanica Silvestri, 1923
