= Haslundiella =

Scientific classification
- Kingdom: Animalia
- Phylum: Arthropoda
- Clade: Pancrustacea
- Class: Insecta
- Order: Archaeognatha
- Family: Machilidae
- Genus: Haslundiella; Janetschek, 1954
- Species: H. iranica

Binomial name
- Haslundiella iranica Gaju, Molero, Tahami & Sadeghi, 2018

Genus of jumping bristletails

Haslundiella is a genus of jumping bristletails in the family Machilidae. There is at least one described species in Haslundiella, H. iranica.
