= Coryphophthalmus =

Scientific classification
- Kingdom: Animalia
- Phylum: Arthropoda
- Clade: Pancrustacea
- Class: Insecta
- Order: Archaeognatha
- Family: Machilidae
- Genus: Coryphophthalmus; Verhoeff, 1910

Genus of jumping bristletails

Coryphophthalmus is a genus of jumping bristletails in the family Machilidae.

== Species ==
Species within this genus include:

- Coryphophthalmus abchasicus
- Coryphophthalmus adigei
- Coryphophthalmus aequatorialis
- Coryphophthalmus alanicus
- Coryphophthalmus banaticus
- Coryphophthalmus bicolorioculus
- Coryphophthalmus borgesi
- Coryphophthalmus borgustani
- Coryphophthalmus brunioculus
- Coryphophthalmus bureschi
- Coryphophthalmus csickii
- Coryphophthalmus divnogorski
- Coryphophthalmus dombayi
- Coryphophthalmus equinus
- Coryphophthalmus fiagdoni
- Coryphophthalmus fuscus
- Coryphophthalmus imitator
- Coryphophthalmus kislovodski
- Coryphophthalmus lapidicola
- Coryphophthalmus lermontovi
- Coryphophthalmus lineatus
- Coryphophthalmus longistylis
- Coryphophthalmus longitarsus
- Coryphophthalmus messazhayi
- Coryphophthalmus mimus
- Coryphophthalmus minor
- Coryphophthalmus montanus
- Coryphophthalmus nematocerus
- Coryphophthalmus obscurus
- Coryphophthalmus petrophilus
- Coryphophthalmus presimplex
- Coryphophthalmus prosvirovi
- Coryphophthalmus remyi
- Coryphophthalmus serbicus
- Coryphophthalmus setosus
- Coryphophthalmus silvestri
- Coryphophthalmus simplex
- Coryphophthalmus subalpinus
- Coryphophthalmus svaneticus
- Coryphophthalmus troglophilus
- Coryphophthalmus viridioculus
- Coryphophthalmus vorontzovi
- Coryphophthalmus wygodzinskyi
