= Heteropsontus =

Scientific classification
- Kingdom: Animalia
- Phylum: Arthropoda
- Clade: Pancrustacea
- Class: Insecta
- Order: Archaeognatha
- Family: Machilidae
- Genus: Heteropsontus; Mendes, 1990
- Species: H. americanus

Binomial name
- Heteropsontus americanus (Silvestri, 1911)

Genus of jumping bristletails

Heteropsontus is a genus of jumping bristletails in the family Machilidae. There is one described species in Heteropsontus, H. americanus.
