= Allopsontus =

Scientific classification
- Kingdom: Animalia
- Phylum: Arthropoda
- Clade: Pancrustacea
- Class: Insecta
- Order: Archaeognatha
- Family: Machilidae
- Genus: Allopsontus; Silvestri, 1911

Genus of jumping bristletails

Allopsontus is a genus of the family Machilidae which belongs to the insect order Archaeognatha (jumping bristletails). Certain species in this genus have been found as high as 5 kilometres above sea level on the Himalayas.

== Species ==
This genus contains 13 species.

- Allopsontus annandalei Silvestri, 1911
- Allopsontus armenicus Mendes, 1983
- Allopsontus davydovae Kaplin, 1987
- Allopsontus europaeus Kaplin, 1983
- Allopsontus kerzhneri Kaplin, 1982
- Allopsontus lineatus Kaplin, 2002
- Allopsontus oubehi Bitsch, 1968
- Allopsontus schmidi Wygodzinsky, 1974
- Allopsontus spinosissimus Mendes, 1981
- Allopsontus swani Wygodzinsky, 1974
- Allopsontus tianshanicus Kaplin, 1982
- Allopsontus tuxeni Wygodzinsky, 1950
- Allopsontus wygodzinskyi Bitsch, 1968
