= Afrochilis =

Scientific classification
- Kingdom: Animalia
- Phylum: Arthropoda
- Clade: Pancrustacea
- Class: Insecta
- Order: Archaeognatha
- Family: Machilidae
- Genus: Afrochilis
- Species: A. insularis

Binomial name
- Afrochilis insularis Sturm, 2001

Species of jumping bristletail

Afrochilis insularis is the only known member of the genus Afrochilis of the family Machilidae, which is from the order Archaeognatha. It is endemic to the Socotra archipelago, a group of isolated islands.
