= Catamachilis =

Scientific classification
- Kingdom: Animalia
- Phylum: Arthropoda
- Clade: Pancrustacea
- Class: Insecta
- Order: Archaeognatha
- Family: Machilidae
- Genus: Catamachilis; Silvestri, 1923

Genus of jumping bristletails

Catamachilis is a genus of the family Machilidae which belongs to the insect order Archaeognatha (jumping bristletails). They mostly occur in Spain.

== Accepted species ==
- Catamachilis amara Janetschek, 1954
- Catamachilis ancorata Stach, 1930
- Catamachilis clipeata Stach, 1930
- Catamachilis constricta (Navas, 1905)
- Catamachilis franzi Janetschek, 1954
