= Machilopsis =

Scientific classification
- Kingdom: Animalia
- Phylum: Arthropoda
- Clade: Pancrustacea
- Class: Insecta
- Order: Archaeognatha
- Family: Machilidae
- Genus: Machilopsis; Olfers, 1907

Genus of jumping bristletails

Machilopsis is a genus of jumping bristletails in the family Machilidae. The genus contains only one species, Machilopsis affinis.
