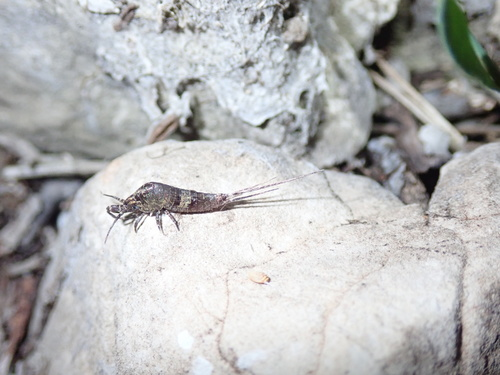
- Praemachilis excelsior

Scientific classification
- Kingdom: Animalia
- Phylum: Arthropoda
- Clade: Pancrustacea
- Class: Insecta
- Order: Archaeognatha
- Family: Machilidae
- Genus: Praemachilis; Silvestri, 1904

Species
- See text

= Praemachilis =

Praemachilis Temporal range: Latest Eocene (Priabonian) - Present

Genus of jumping bristletails

Praemachilis is a genus of jumping bristletails in the family Machilidae.

== Species ==
- Praemachilis aetnensis
- Praemachilis brevicornis
- †Praemachilis cineracea
- Praemachilis confucius
- Praemachilis excelsior
- Praemachilis gigas
- Praemachilis longistylis
- Praemachilis meticulosa
- Praemachilis parvicornis
- Praemachilis trispina
