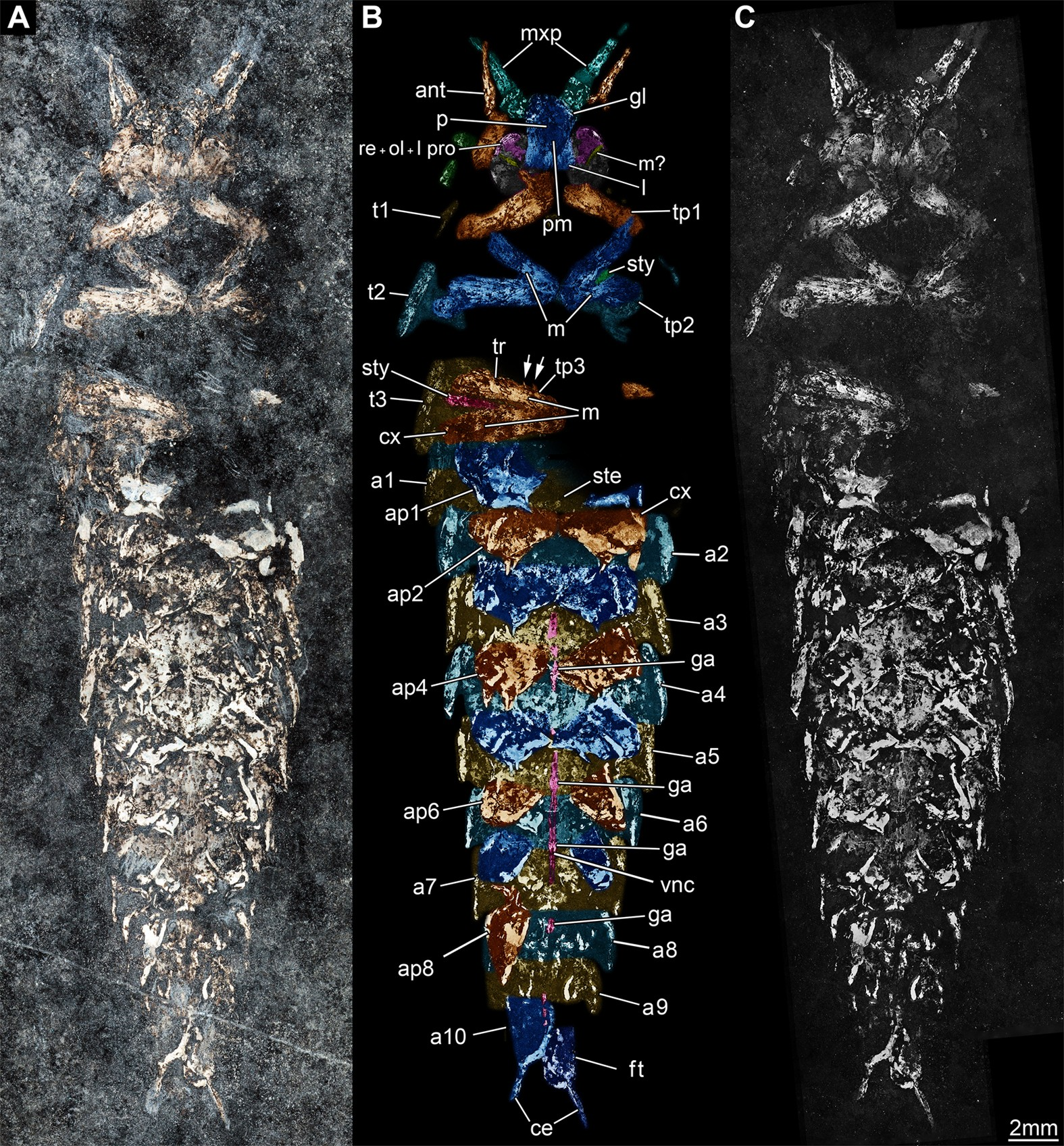
- Type specimen

Scientific classification
- Kingdom: Animalia
- Phylum: Arthropoda
- Clade: Pancrustacea
- Class: Insecta
- Order: Archaeognatha
- Family: Machilidae
- Genus: †Gigamachilis; Montagna, Haug, Strada, Haug, Felber & Tintori, 2017
- Species: †G. triassicus

Binomial name
- †Gigamachilis triassicus Montagna, Haug, Strada, Haug, Felber & Tintori, 2017

= Gigamachilis =

Gigamachilis Temporal range: Late Ladinian, 239.5–237.0 Ma

Genus of jumping bristletails

Gigamachilis is an extinct genus of jumping bristletails in the family Machilidae. The genus consists of a single species, Gigamachilis triassicus, from the Middle Triassic (Ladinian) aged Meride Limestone of Monte San Giorgio, northern Italy. The species is the largest archaeognath known to have ever existed, reaching a total length of approximately 8 centimetres (3.1 in).
