= Meximachilis =

Scientific classification
- Kingdom: Animalia
- Phylum: Arthropoda
- Clade: Pancrustacea
- Class: Insecta
- Order: Archaeognatha
- Family: Machilidae
- Genus: Meximachilis; Wygodzinsky, 1945

Genus of jumping bristletails

Meximachilis is a genus of jumping bristletails in the family Machilidae. There are at least three described species in Meximachilis.

== Species ==
These three species belong to the genus Meximachilis:

- Meximachilis cockendolpheri Kaplin, 1994
- Meximachilis dampfi Wygodzinsky, 1946
- Meximachilis tuxeni Sturm, 1991
