= Praetrigoniophthalmus =

Scientific classification
- Kingdom: Animalia
- Phylum: Arthropoda
- Clade: Pancrustacea
- Class: Insecta
- Order: Archaeognatha
- Family: Machilidae
- Genus: Praetrigoniophthalmus; Janetschek, 1954

Genus of jumping bristletails

Praetrigoniophthalmus is a genus of jumping bristletails in the family Machilidae. There are at least two described species in Praetrigoniophthalmus.

== Species ==
These two species belong to the genus Praetrigoniophthalmus:

- Praetrigoniophthalmus kuhnelti Janetschek, 1954
- Praetrigoniophthalmus meticulosa (Silvestri, 1904)
