= Metagraphitarsus =

Scientific classification
- Kingdom: Animalia
- Phylum: Arthropoda
- Clade: Pancrustacea
- Class: Insecta
- Order: Archaeognatha
- Family: Machilidae
- Genus: Metagraphitarsus; Paclt, 1969

Genus of jumping bristletails

Metagraphitarsus is a genus of jumping bristletails in the family Machilidae. The genus contains only one species, Metagraphitarsus doriae.
