= Mendeschilis =

Scientific classification
- Kingdom: Animalia
- Phylum: Arthropoda
- Clade: Pancrustacea
- Class: Insecta
- Order: Archaeognatha
- Family: Machilidae
- Genus: Mendeschilis; Gaju, Mora, Molero & Bach, 2000
- Species: M. escorcai

Binomial name
- Mendeschilis escorcai Gaju, Mora, Molero & Bach, 2000

Genus of jumping bristletails

Mendeschilis is a genus of jumping bristletails in the family Machilidae. There is at least one described species in Mendeschilis, M. escorcai.
