= Or83b odorant receptor =

Odorant receptor coreceptor

Identifiers
- Organism: Drosophila melanogaster
- Symbol: orcoOrthologs
- Orthologs: OMA: entry
- UniProt: Q9VNB5
Search for
- Structures: Swiss-model
- Domains: InterPro

Or83b, also known as Orco (short for "odorant receptor co-receptor"), is an odorant receptor and the corresponding gene that encodes it. The odorant receptor Or83b is not exclusively expressed in insects. Though its actual function is still a mystery, the broadly expressed Or83b has been conserved across highly divergent insect populations across 250 million years of evolution.

== Function ==
There are two contending models for potentially explaining Or83b function. One proposes that it could interact with specific odor stimuli independently of other odorant receptors (ORs). The other proposes that it could act with other ORs to mediate responses to all odors. Or83b mutation disrupts behavioral and electrophysiological responses to many odorants, which supports the second model that OR plays a general rather than specific role in olfaction. When mutating the Or83b gene, larval Drosophila do not travel towards an area of ethyl acetate, which is an important odorant related to rotting fruit.

== Functional conservation ==
The OR genes appear to be a single lineage nested within the gustatory receptor (GR) family. Or83b, however, is divergent from other OR proteins and appears most similar to the usual GRs. This conservation suggests that Or83b serves a function unlike that of other chemoreceptors.

By cloning orthologs of Or83b, performing in situ hybridization of the clones, and by creating transgenic flies with orthologs of mosquitos, medflies, and moths, the function of Or83b was determined to be conserved across highly divergent insect populations. Or83b has homologs in other insect species.

Since Or83b responds not to specific odors but to odors in general the Or83b receptor must respond to a feature of other ORs that it has coevolved with. That insects have used only a single protein for odor detection suggests that Or83b functions in insects in a way that cannot be diversified.

== Practical implications ==
Since insects play a large role in spreading infectious blood borne diseases between humans, understanding how they locate their human hosts with their olfactory systems could lead to inhibiting their method of locating hosts. The potential strategy involved would be to create small molecules that mimic the Or83b mutation and inhibit the receptor and disperse them, since it would be impractical to mutate the gene for the receptor in an entire population of disease-spreading insects.

In some species of insect, drawing blood meals is a behavior not normally witnessed that could be brought on by a sudden lack of avoidance of vertebrate odor. Food preference in insects is not always about attraction to certain odors but the lack of repellant response to the odor. The fruit-piercing moth (Calyptrata thalictri) has been known to draw blood from mammalian hosts when the number of a particular group of olfactory sensing neurons that generally produce a repellent response to vertebrate volatiles is reduced. This halts their usually innate repulsive behavior to vertebrate odors and increases the chance that they will attempt to draw blood from a host. Because this is a change not in Or83b but in a population of olfactory sensory neurons, dispersing molecules to inhibit Or83b would not stop the behavior and a new strategy would have to develop.
