= Coreamachilis =

Scientific classification
- Kingdom: Animalia
- Phylum: Arthropoda
- Clade: Pancrustacea
- Class: Insecta
- Order: Archaeognatha
- Family: Machilidae
- Genus: Coreamachilis; Mendes, 1993

Genus of jumping bristletails

Coreamachilis is a genus of jumping bristletails in the family Machilidae. There is at least one described species in Coreamachilis, C. coreanus.
