= Paramachilis =

Scientific classification
- Kingdom: Animalia
- Phylum: Arthropoda
- Clade: Pancrustacea
- Class: Insecta
- Order: Archaeognatha
- Family: Machilidae
- Genus: Paramachilis; Wygodzinsky, 1941
- Species: P. paucispina

Binomial name
- Paramachilis paucispina Janetschek, 1954

Genus of jumping bristletails

Paramachilis is a genus of jumping bristletails in the family Machilidae. There are at least four described species in Paramachilis. They mostly occur in Algeria, Morocco, Spain and Tunisia.

== Species ==
These four species belong to the genus Paramachilis:

- Paramachilis acuminothorax
- Paramachilis lucasi
- Paramachilis paucispina
- Paramachilis rifensis
