= Onychomachilis =

Onychomachilis Temporal range: Pliocene

Scientific classification
- Kingdom: Animalia
- Phylum: Arthropoda
- Clade: Pancrustacea
- Class: Insecta
- Order: Archaeognatha
- Family: Machilidae
- Genus: †Onychomachilis; Pierce, 1951
- Species: †O. fisheri

Binomial name
- †Onychomachilis fisheri Pierce, 1951

Extinct genus of jumping bristletails

Onychomachilis is an extinct genus of jumping bristletails in the family Machilidae. There is one described species in Onychomachilis, O. fisheri.
