= Afromachilis =

Scientific classification
- Kingdom: Animalia
- Phylum: Arthropoda
- Clade: Pancrustacea
- Class: Insecta
- Order: Archaeognatha
- Family: Machilidae
- Genus: Afromachilis; Mendes, 1981
- Species: A. makungu

Binomial name
- Afromachilis makungu (Wygodzinsky, 1952)

Species of jumping bristletail

Afromachilis makungu is the only known member of the genus Afromachilis of the family Machilidae, which is from the order Archaeognatha. It is found in Katanga, a province of the Democratic Republic of the Congo. It has one synonym, Paramachilis makungu Wygodzinsky, 1952
