= Metamachilis =

Scientific classification
- Kingdom: Animalia
- Phylum: Arthropoda
- Clade: Pancrustacea
- Class: Insecta
- Order: Archaeognatha
- Family: Machilidae
- Genus: Metamachilis; Silvestri, 1936

Genus of jumping bristletails

Metamachilis is a genus of jumping bristletails in the family Machilidae. The genus contains only one species, Metamachilis pieli.
