= Silvestrichiloides =

Scientific classification
- Kingdom: Animalia
- Phylum: Arthropoda
- Clade: Pancrustacea
- Class: Insecta
- Order: Archaeognatha
- Family: Machilidae
- Genus: Silvestrichiloides; Mendes, 1990

Genus of jumping bristletails

Silvestrichiloides is a genus of jumping bristletails in the family Machilidae.

== Species ==
The genus has two species.

- Silvestrichiloides beckeri (Paclt, 1960)
- Silvestrichiloides gussakovskii (Kaplin, 1982)
