= Trigoniomachilis =

Scientific classification
- Kingdom: Animalia
- Phylum: Arthropoda
- Clade: Pancrustacea
- Class: Insecta
- Order: Archaeognatha
- Family: Machilidae
- Genus: Trigoniomachilis; Stach, 1937

Genus of jumping bristletails

Trigoniomachilis is a genus of jumping bristletails in the family Machilidae. There are at least four described species in Trigoniomachilis.

== Species ==
These four species belong to the genus Trigoniomachilis:

- Trigoniomachilis remyiana Wygodzinsky, 1958
- Trigoniomachilis saovensis Bach, 1982
- Trigoniomachilis thessalica Wygodzinsky, 1958
- Trigoniomachilis urumovi Stach, 1937
