= Haslundichilis =

Scientific classification
- Kingdom: Animalia
- Phylum: Arthropoda
- Clade: Pancrustacea
- Class: Insecta
- Order: Archaeognatha
- Family: Machilidae
- Genus: Haslundichilis; Wygodzinsky, 1950

Genus of jumping bristletails

Haslundichilis is a genus of jumping bristletails in the family Machilidae. There are at least two described species in Haslundichilis.

== Species ==
These two species belong to the genus Haslundichilis:

- Haslundichilis afghani Wygodzinsky, 1950
- Haslundichilis hedini Silvestri
