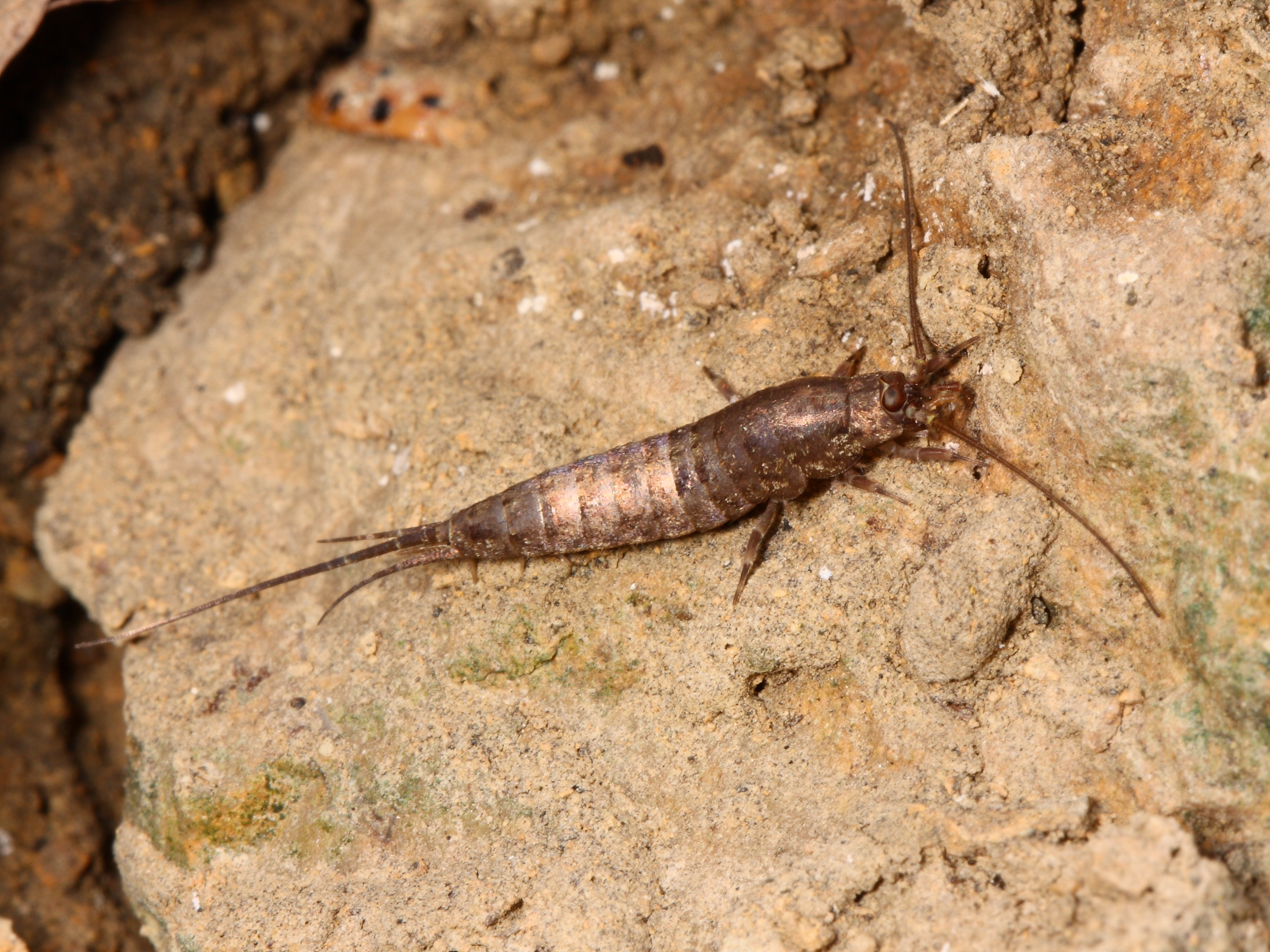
- A rock bristletail (Machilinus aurantiacus)

Scientific classification
- Kingdom: Animalia
- Phylum: Arthropoda
- Clade: Pancrustacea
- Class: Insecta
- Subclass: Monocondylia; Haeckel, 1866
- Order: Archaeognatha; Börner, 1904

Suborders
- †Monura (Sharov 1957 stat. nov. Carpenter 1992); Machilida (Grassi 1888 stat. nov. Zhang et al. 2018)

Synonyms
- Microcoryphia (Verhoeff 1904); Trinemura (Crampton 1916); Protothysanura (Crampton 1924 non Smith 1897)

= Archaeognatha =

Archaeognatha Temporal range: Devonian–Recent

Order of wingless insects

The Archaeognatha are an order of apterygotes, commonly known as jumping bristletails or humpbacked bristletails. "Bristletail" is mostly used for these true (ectognathous) insects, but there is overlap with the entognathan two-pronged bristletails. Among extant insect taxa they are some of the most evolutionarily primitive; they appeared in the Middle Devonian period at about the same time as the arachnids. Specimens that closely resemble extant species have been found as both body and trace fossils (the latter including body imprints and trackways) in strata from the remainder of the Paleozoic Era and more recent periods. For historical reasons an alternative name for the order is Microcoryphia.

Until the late 20th century the suborders Zygentoma and Archaeognatha comprised the order Thysanura; both orders possess three-pronged tails comprising two lateral cerci and a medial epiproct or appendix dorsalis. Of the three organs, the appendix dorsalis is considerably longer than the two cerci; in this the Archaeognatha differ from the Zygentoma, in which the three organs are subequal in length. In the late 20th century, it was recognized that the order Thysanura was paraphyletic, thus the two suborders were each raised to the status of an independent monophyletic order, with Archaeognatha sister taxon to the Dicondylia, including the Zygentoma.

The order Archaeognatha is cosmopolitan; it includes roughly 600 species in two families. No species is currently evaluated as being at conservation risk.

== Etymology ==
The name Archaeognatha is derived from the Greek ἀρχαῖος, archaios, meaning 'ancient', and γνάθος, gnathos, meaning 'jaw'. This refers to the articulation of the mandibles, which are different from those of other insects. It was originally believed that Archaeognatha possessed a single phylogenetically primitive condyle each (thus the name "Monocondylia"), where all more derived insects have two, but this has since been shown to be incorrect; all insects, including Archaeognatha, have dicondylic mandibles, but archaeognaths possess two articulations that are homologous to those in other insects, though slightly different.

An alternative name, Microcoryphia, comes from the Greek μικρός, mikros, 'small', and κορυφή, koryphē, which in context means 'head'.

== Description ==
Archaeognatha are small insects with elongated bodies and backs that are arched, especially over the thorax. Their abdomen ends in three long tail-like structures, of which the lateral two are cerci, while the medial filament, which is longest, is an epiproct. The tenth abdominal segment is reduced. The antennae are flexible. The two large compound eyes meet at the top of the head, and there are three ocelli. The mouthparts are partly retractable, with simple chewing mandibles and seven-segmented maxillary palps which are commonly longer than the legs.

Unlike other insect orders, they do not have olfactory receptor-coreceptors (Orco), which have either been lost or were never present in the first place.

Archaeognatha differ from Zygentoma in various ways, such as their relatively small head, their bodies being compressed laterally (from side to side) instead of flattened dorsiventrally, and in their being able to use their tails to spring up to 30 cm (12 in) into the air if disturbed. They have eight pairs of short appendages called styli on abdominal segments 2 to 9. Family Machilidae is also unique among insects in possessing small muscleless styli on the second and third thoracic legs, but are absent on the second pair of thoracic legs in some genera. Similar stylets on the legs are absent in family Meinertellidae. They have one or two pairs of eversible membranous vesicles on the underside of abdominal segments 1 to 7, which are used to absorb water and assisting with molting. There are nine pairs of spiracles; two pairs on the thorax, and seven pairs on abdominal segments 2 to 8. The pair of spiracles on the first abdominal segment has been lost.

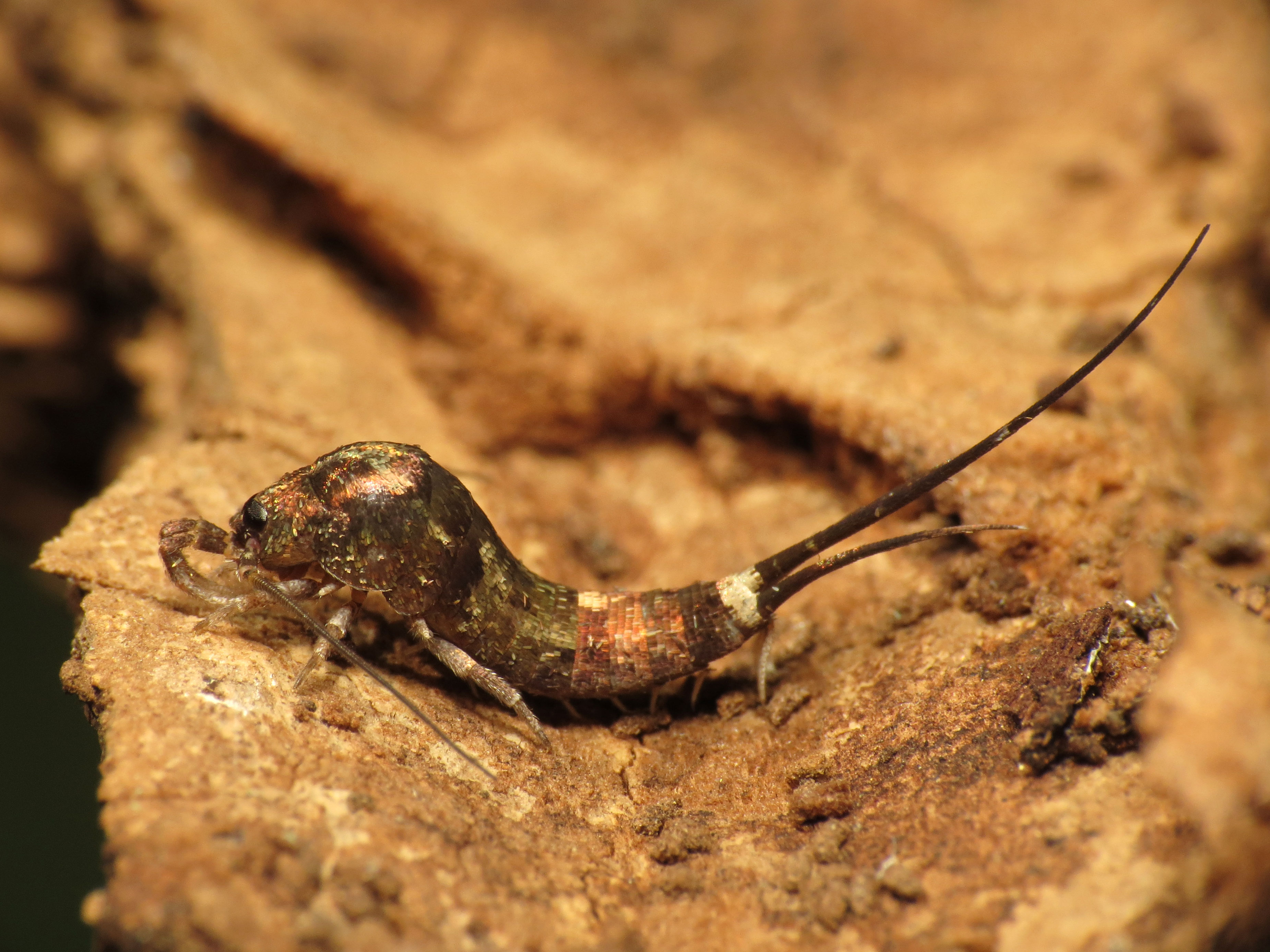
Lateral aspect of an archaeognathan, showing arched profile and abdominal styli

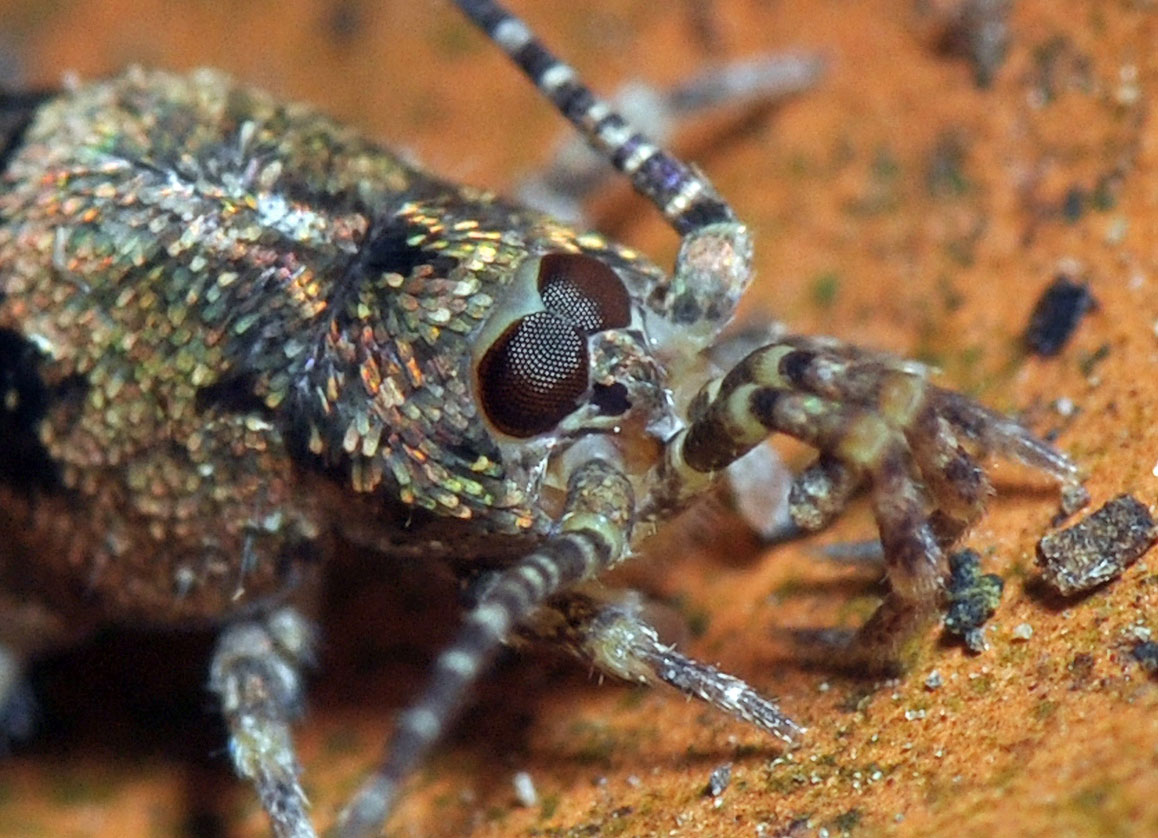
Head of a machilid, showing compound eyes, prominent maxillary palps, and detachable scales.

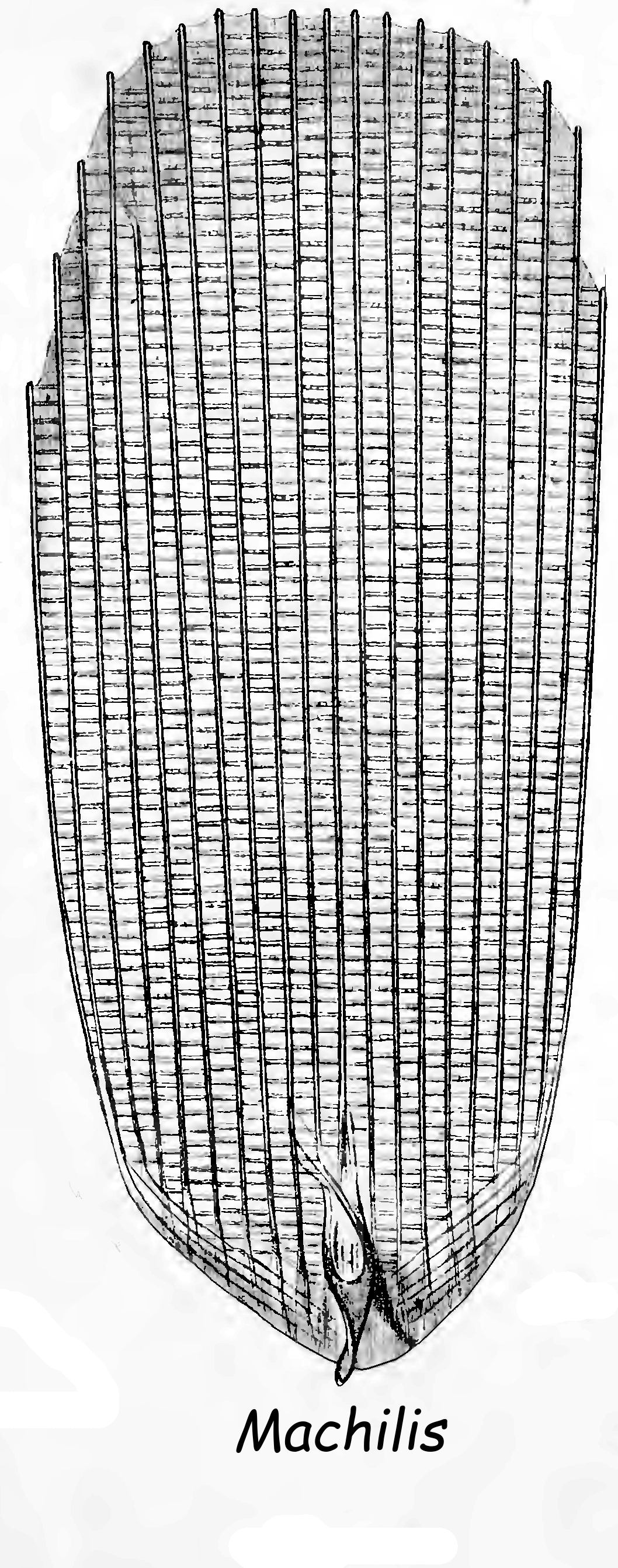
Drawing of a scale, much magnified, from a species in the family Machilidae

Further unusual features are that the abdominal sternites are each composed of three sclerites, and they cement themselves to the substrate before molting, often using their own feces as glue. The body is covered with readily detached scales, that make the animals difficult to grip and also may protect the exoskeleton from abrasion. The thin exoskeleton offers little protection against dehydration, and they accordingly must remain in moist air, such as in cool, damp situations under stones or bark.

== Taxonomy ==
=== Suborder †Monura (8 species) ===
- Family †Dasyleptidae
  - †Dasyleptus Brongniart, 1885

=== Suborder Machilida (approximately 600 species) ===
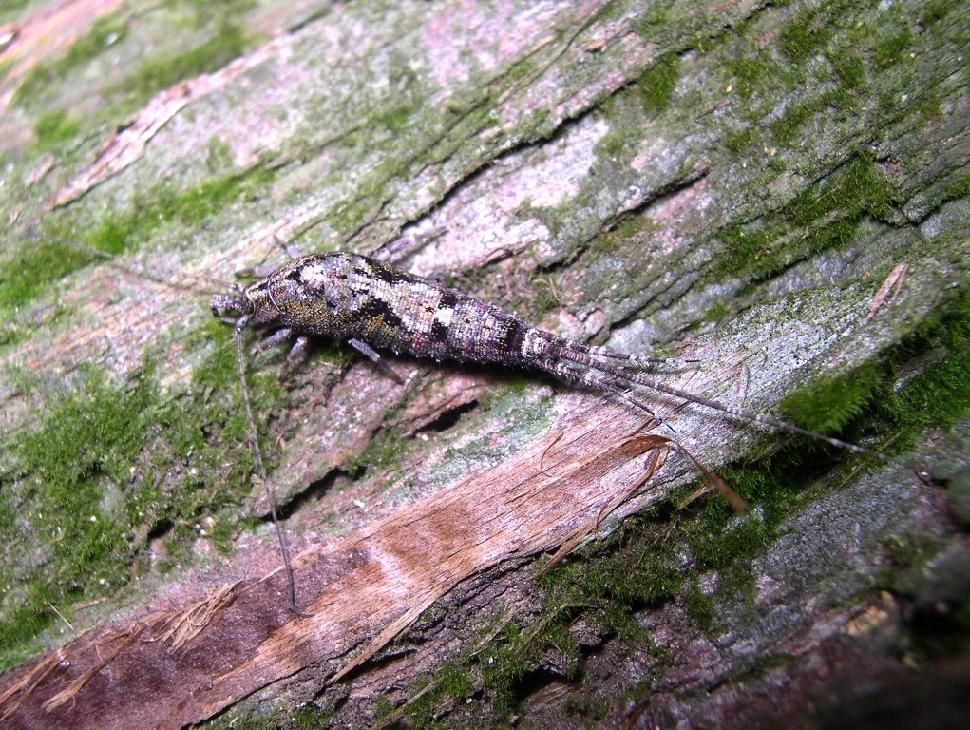
A Machilidae species

- Family Machilidae (Most are restricted to rocky shorelines)
  - Afrochilis Sturm, 2002
  - Afromachilis Mendes, 1981
  - Allopsontus Silvestri, 1911
  - Bachilis Mendes, 1977
  - Catamachilis Silvestri, 1923
  - Charimachilis Wygodzinsky, 1939
  - Coreamachilis Mendes, 1993
  - Corethromachilis Carpenter, 1916
  - Coryphophthalmus Verhoeff, 1910
  - Dilta Strand, 1911
  - †Gigamachilis Montagna, Haug, Strada, Haug, Felber & Tintori, 2017
  - Graphitarsus Silvestri, 1908
  - Haslundichilis Wygodzinsky, 1950
  - Haslundiella Janetschek, 1954
  - Heteropsontus Mendes, 1990
  - Himalayachilis Wygodzinsky, 1952
  - Janetschekilis Wygodzinsky, 1958
  - Lepismachilis Verhoeff, 1910
  - Leptomachilis Sturm, 1991
  - Machilis Latrielle, 1832
  - Machilopsis Olfers, 1907
  - Mendeschilis Gaju, Mora, Molero & Bach, 2000
  - Mesomachilis Silvestri, 1911
  - Metagraphitarsus Paclt, 1969
  - Metamachilis Silvestri, 1936
  - Meximachilis Wygodzinsky, 1945
  - Neomachilis Silvestri, 1911
  - †Onychomachilis Pierce, 1951
  - Paramachilis Wygodzinsky, 1941
  - Parapetrobius Mendes, 1980
  - Pedetontinus Silvestri, 1943
  - Pedetontoides Mendes, 1981
  - Pedetontus Silvestri, 1911
  - Petridiobius Paclt, 1970
  - Petrobiellus Silvestri, 1943
  - Petrobius Leach, 1817
  - Praemachilis Silvestri, 1904
  - Praemachiloides Janetschek, 1954
  - Praetrigoniophthalmus Janetschek, 1954
  - Promesomachilis Silvestri, 1923
  - Pseudocatamachilis Gaju & Bach, 1991
  - Pseudomachilanus Paclt, 1969
  - Silvestrichilis Wygodzinsky, 1950
  - Silvestrichiloides Mendes, 1990
  - Stachilis Janetschek, 1957
  - Trigoniomachilis Stach, 1937
  - Trigoniophthalmus Verhoeff, 1910
  - Wygodzinskilis Janetschek, 1954

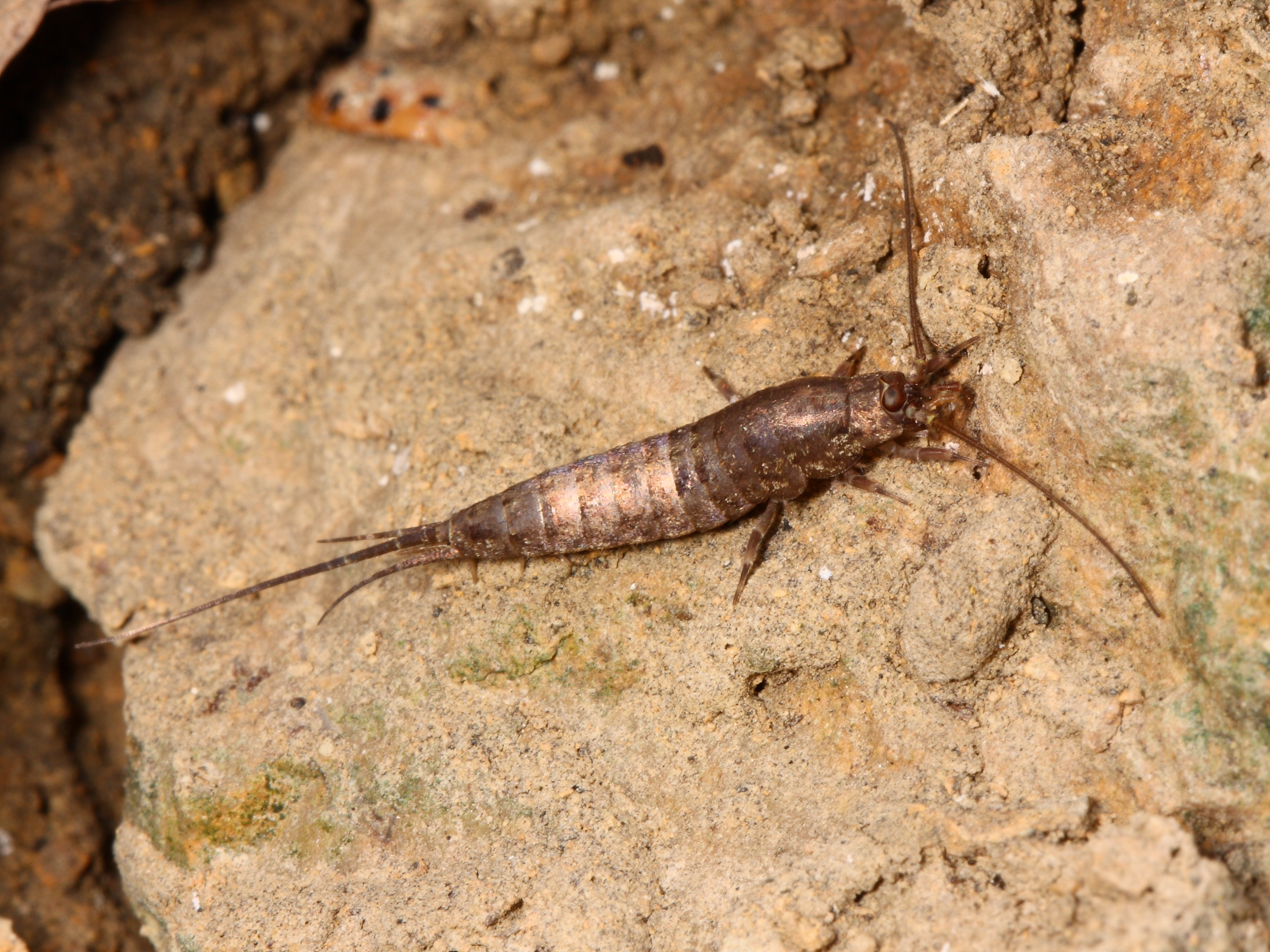
A Meinertellidae species

- Family Meinertellidae (Lack scales at base of hind legs and antennae)
  - Hypomachilodes Silvestri, 1911
  - Machilinus Silvestri, 1905
  - Machiloides Silvestri, 1904
  - Meinertellus Silvestri, 1911
  - Machilontus Silvestri, 1911
  - Macropsontus Silvestri, 1911
  - Machilellus Silvestri, 1910
  - Machilelloides Sturm & Smith, 1993

== Biology ==
Archaeognatha occur in a wide range of habitats. While most species live in moist soil, others have adapted to chaparral, and even sandy deserts. They feed primarily on algae, but also lichens, mosses, or decaying organic detritus.

Three types of mating behavior are known. In some species the male spins a silk thread (carrier thread) stretched out on the ground. On the thread there are droplets of sperm which the female will take up when her ovipositor makes contact. In others a packet of sperm (spermatophore) is deposited on the top of a short stalk. If a female takes up the sperm or not is often random, but in many species the male will try to lead the female's genitals over the sperm during courtship. A more direct way of fertilization occurs in species of the genus Petrobius, where the male place a droplet of sperm directly on the female's ovipositor. One hypothesis is that the external genitals of insects started as structures specialized for water-uptake, which could reach deeper crevices than the coxal vesicles, and over time the female would use it to take up sperm from the ground instead of water. After fertilization she lays a batch of around 30 eggs in a suitable crevice. The young resemble the adults, and take up to two years to reach sexual maturity, depending on the species and conditions such as temperature and available food.

Unlike most insects, the adults continue to moult after reaching adulthood, and typically mate once at each instar. Archaeognaths may have a total lifespan of up to four years, longer than most larger insects.
