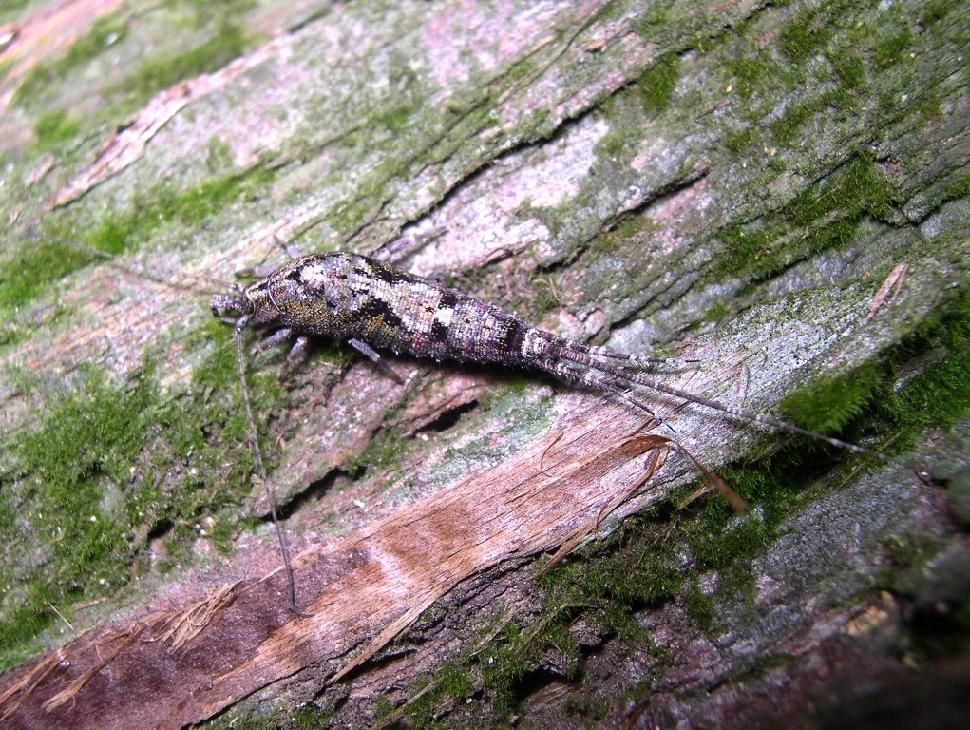
- Pedetontus unimaculatus (female)

Scientific classification
- Kingdom: Animalia
- Phylum: Arthropoda
- Class: Insecta
- Order: Archaeognatha
- Family: Machilidae; Grassi, 1888

= Machilidae =

Machilidae Temporal range: Ladinian–Present

Family of jumping bristletails

The Machilidae, commonly known as jumping bristletails, are a family of insects belonging to the order Archaeognatha (the bristletails). There are around 450 described species worldwide. These insects are wingless, elongated and more or less cylindrical with a distinctive humped thorax and covered with tiny, close-fitting scales. The colour is usually grey or brown, sometimes intricately patterned. There are three "tails" at the rear of the abdomen: two cerci and a long central epiproct. They have large compound eyes, often meeting at a central point. They resemble the silverfish and the firebrat, which are from a different order, Zygentoma.

Machilids undergo virtually no metamorphosis during their life cycles, and both nymphs and adults are generally inconspicuous herbivores and scavengers. Many species are restricted to rocky shorelines, but some are found in well-vegetated habitats inland. They can move very fast and often escape by jumping considerable distances when disturbed.

Like all Archaeognatha, machilids transfer sperm indirectly from male to female. Some species can spin silken threads that lead the female to the spermatophore. Other species can produce silken stalks on which they place droplets of sperm.

There are no aquatic species, but some littoral forms, such as Parapetrobius and Petrobius, can swim.

Their fossil records extends back into the Triassic with the genus Gigamachilis from the Middle Triassic of Italy and Switzerland, around 240 million years old.

== Distribution and habitat ==
Members of the family Machilidae are primarily terrestrial insects inhabiting a wide range of moist, sheltered microhabitats. They are most commonly found among leaf litter, under stones, beneath loose bark, in rock crevices, and within accumulations of organic detritus, where they feed on algae, lichens, and decaying plant material. Many species occur in open, sun-exposed environments such as rocky outcrops, coastal cliffs, dunes, and scree slopes, while others inhabit forest floors and woodland margins. Some taxa are synanthropic and may occur on stone walls, rooftops, or other man-made substrates that provide suitable crevices and biofilm growth.

Machilidae has a broad, nearly cosmopolitan distribution, with species recorded from all biogeographic regions except Antarctica. The family is especially diverse in temperate and Mediterranean climates, where numerous genera are associated with xeric, rocky habitats. In tropical regions, representatives occur in montane and shaded environments as well as in coastal zones. Both continental and insular faunas are known, including species endemic to oceanic islands. Overall distribution patterns reflect the family’s preference for microhabitats that combine surface stability, shelter from desiccation, and the presence of algal or lichen growth.

== Description ==
=== Overview ===
The family Machilidae comprises small to medium-sized jumping bristletails characterized by an elongate, cylindrical body covered with overlapping scales and bearing three long terminal filaments (paired cerci and a median epiproct). Adults generally measure about 7–20 mm in body length, excluding appendages.

=== Head ===
The head is large and hypognathous, with very large compound eyes that are contiguous or nearly contiguous along the midline in most species; three well-developed ocelli are present. Antennae are long, filiform, and many-segmented, typically exceeding body length.

=== Mouthpart ===
Mouthparts are ectognathous and mandibulate, adapted for scraping and grazing on algae, lichens, and detritus; mandibles are robust with distinct incisor and molar regions, and the maxillary palps are 5-segmented.

=== Thorax ===
The thorax is strongly arched dorsally, producing a hump-backed profile; the pronotum is comparatively small, while the meso- and metanota are enlarged.

=== Leg ===
Legs are cursorial and saltatorial, with enlarged hind femora and elongated tibiae that enable the characteristic jumping behavior. Tarsi are 3-segmented, terminating in paired claws with a median arolium.

=== Abdomen ===
The abdomen consists of 11 segments. Well-developed articulated styli occur ventrally on segments II–IX, and paired eversible vesicles are present on segments II–VII, functioning in water absorption and adhesion. Tergites are imbricate and clothed with posteriorly directed setae and scales, often producing mottled gray, brown, or metallic coloration. The three caudal filaments are many-segmented, subequal, and usually longer than the body.

=== Sexual dimorphism and nymph stage ===
Sexual dimorphism is slight. Females possess a prominent external ovipositor formed by elongate, annulated gonapophyses of abdominal segments VIII and IX, typically projecting posteriorly between the cerci; males lack an ovipositor and bear small parameres associated with the genital opening on segment IX. Immature stages resemble adults but are smaller and sexually undeveloped, with growth through successive molts and continued molting after sexual maturity.

== Genera ==
- Afrochilis Sturm, 2002
- Afromachilis Mendes, 1981
- Allopsontus Silvestri, 1911
- Bachilis Mendes, 1977
- Catamachilis Silvestri, 1923
- Charimachilis Wygodzinsky, 1939
- Coreamachilis Mendes, 1993
- Corethromachilis Carpenter, 1916
- Coryphophthalmus Verhoeff, 1910
- Dilta Strand, 1911
- †Gigamachilis Montagna, Haug, Strada, Haug, Felber & Tintori, 2017
- Graphitarsus Silvestri, 1908
- Haslundichilis Wygodzinsky, 1950
- Haslundiella Janetschek, 1954
- Heteropsontus Mendes, 1990
- Himalayachilis Wygodzinsky, 1952
- Janetschekilis Wygodzinsky, 1958
- Lepismachilis Verhoeff, 1910
- Leptomachilis Sturm, 1991
- Machilis Latrielle, 1832
- Machilopsis Olfers, 1907
- Mendeschilis Gaju, Mora, Molero & Bach, 2000
- Mesomachilis Silvestri, 1911
- Metagraphitarsus Paclt, 1969
- Metamachilis Silvestri, 1936
- Meximachilis Wygodzinsky, 1945
- Neomachilis Silvestri, 1911
- †Onychomachilis Pierce, 1951
- Paramachilis Wygodzinsky, 1941
- Parapetrobius Mendes, 1980
- Pedetontinus Silvestri, 1943
- Pedetontoides Mendes, 1981
- Pedetontus Silvestri, 1911
- Petridiobius Paclt, 1970
- Petrobiellus Silvestri, 1943
- Petrobius Leach, 1817
- Praemachilis Silvestri, 1904
- Praemachiloides Janetschek, 1954
- Praetrigoniophthalmus Janetschek, 1954
- Promesomachilis Silvestri, 1923
- Pseudocatamachilis Gaju & Bach, 1991
- Pseudomachilanus Paclt, 1969
- Silvestrichilis Wygodzinsky, 1950
- Silvestrichiloides Mendes, 1990
- Stachilis Janetschek, 1957
- Trigoniomachilis Stach, 1937
- Trigoniophthalmus Verhoeff, 1910
- Wygodzinskilis Janetschek, 1954

== Gallery ==
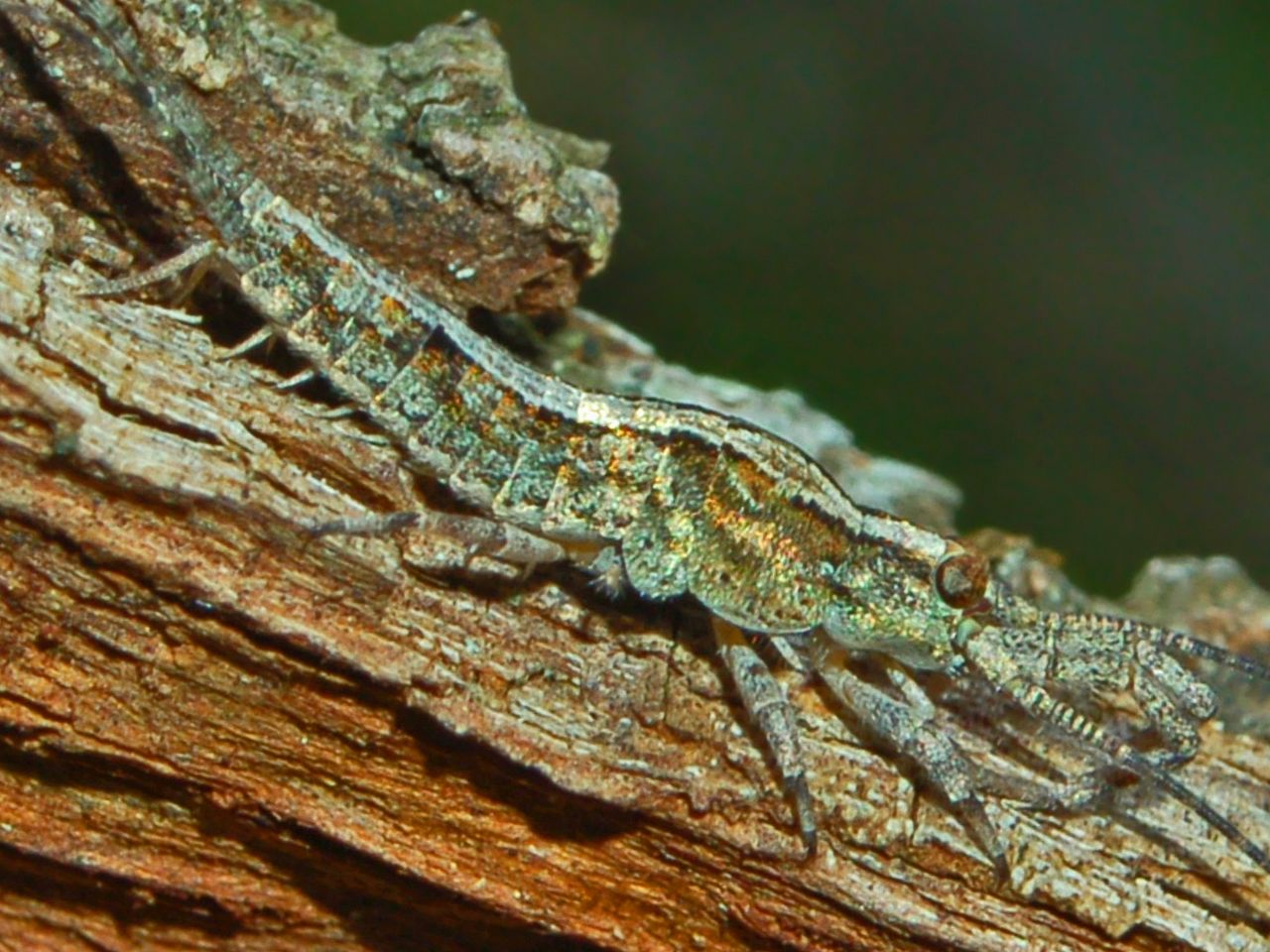
Machilis species

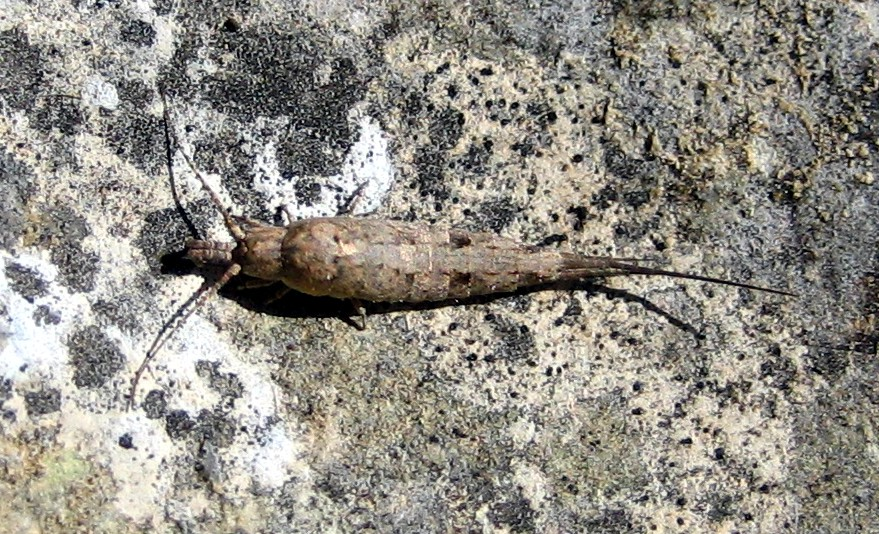
Machilidae species

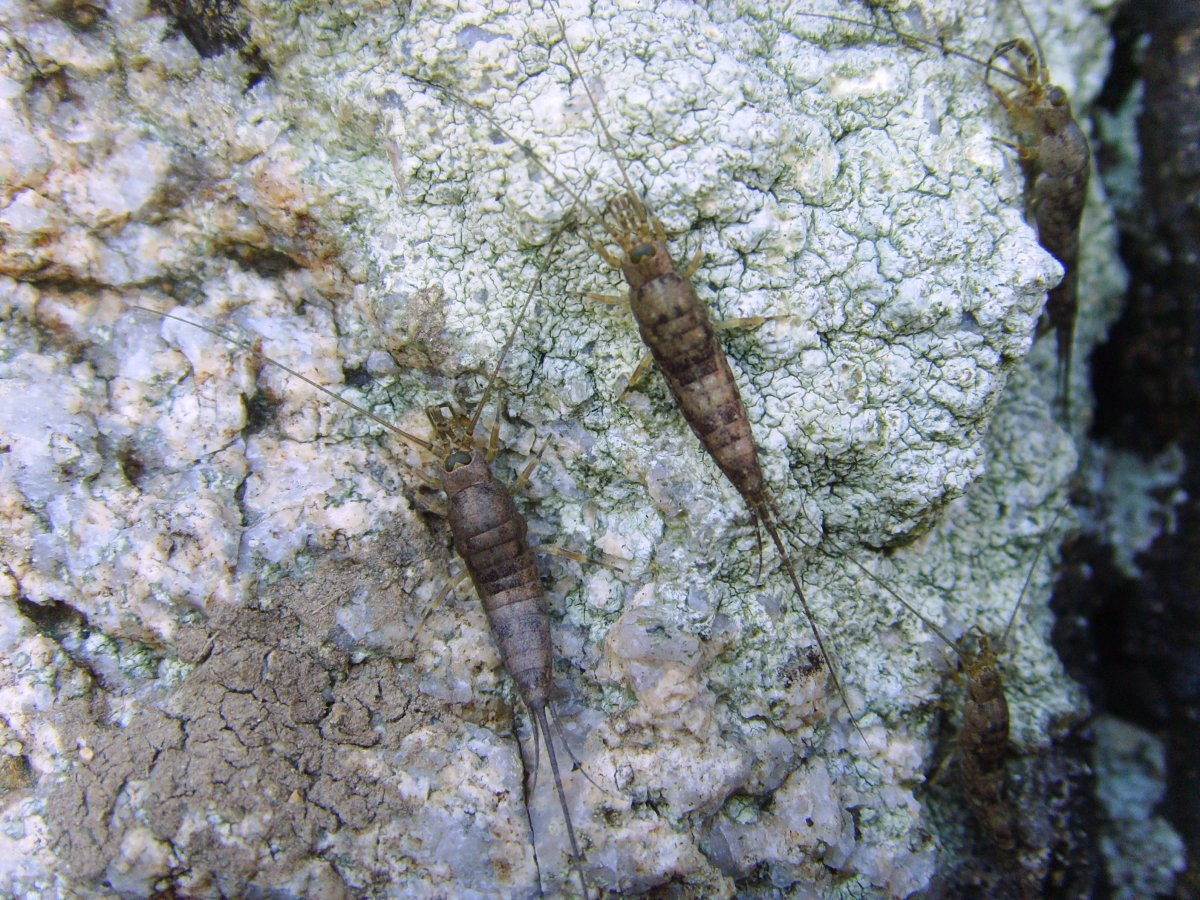
Petrobius maritimus

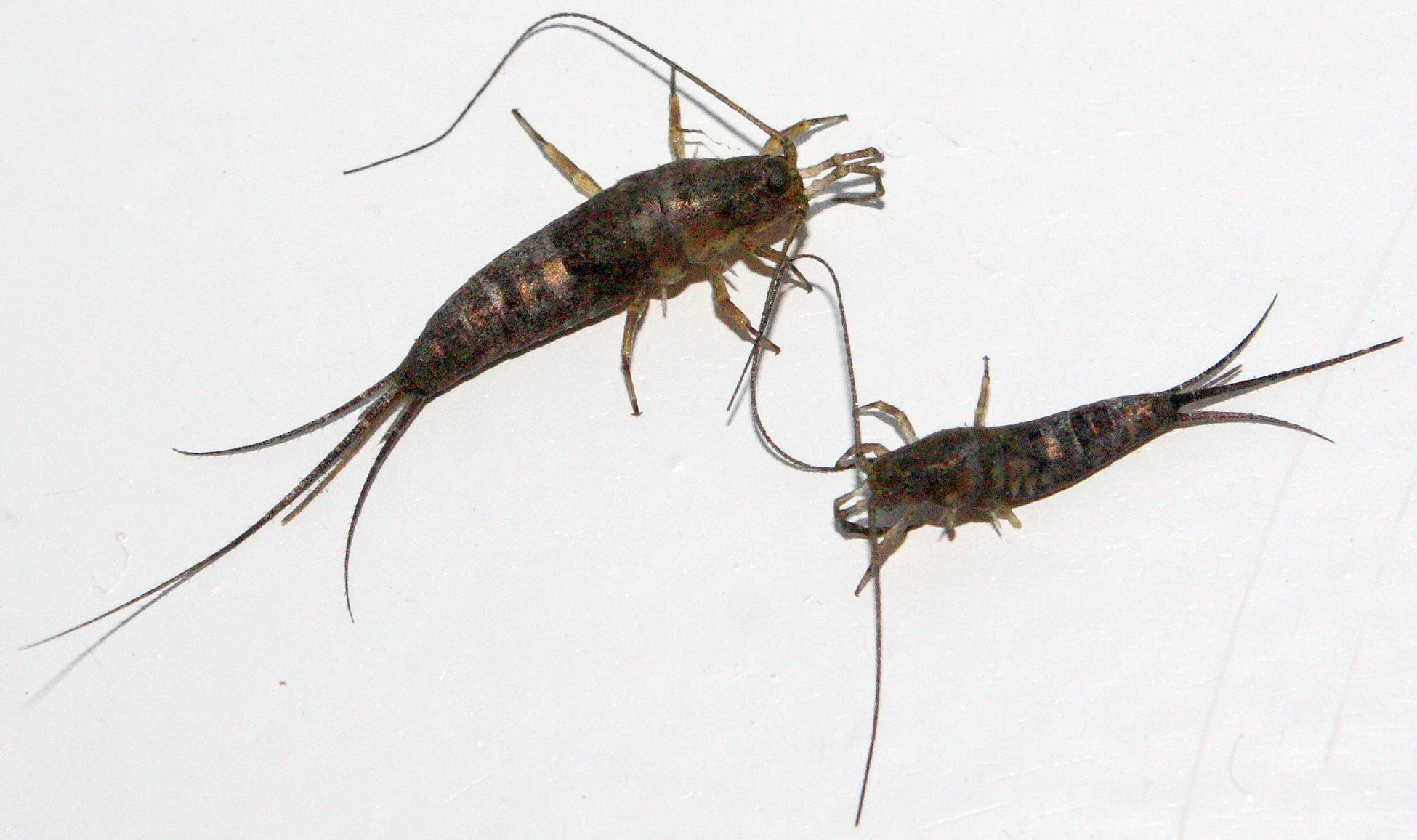
Petrobius brevistylis
