= Jiří Paclt =

Czech-Slovak botanist and entomologist

- Born: 15 January 1925; Prague, Czechoslovakia
- Died: 18 September 2015 (aged 90)
- Scientific career
- Fields: Botany, Entomology, Ornithology, Mineralogy
- Author abbrev. (botany): Paclt
- Author abbrev. (zoology): Paclt

Jiří (Juraj) Paclt (15 January 1925 – 18 September 2015) was a Czech-Slovak botanist and entomologist. Although born and raised in the Czech part of Czechoslovakia, he spent the majority of his work life in the Slovak part that later became Slovakia. His scientific work is characterised by a wide scope of interests and activities, ranging from botany over mineralogy to entomology.

== Personal life and education ==
Jiří Paclt was born in Prague, Czechoslovakia (now the Czech Republic) to Marie (née Šrámková; 1883–1953), a housewife, and Emil Paclt (1880–1953), a mechanical engineer working in the Chief Technical Council at Czechoslovak State Railways. He grew up in Prague, where he went to primary school from 1931 to 1936, followed by high school from 1936 to 1944. After graduation, he was assigned as a laborer to the company Autoavia as part of the Protectorate "Totaleinsatz" (total deployment). After the end of World War II, he enrolled at the Faculty of Natural Sciences at Charles University in Prague. He completed his studies in October 1948 with rigorous examinations in botany and zoology and defended his diploma thesis entitled "Monografie rodu Catalpa" ("Monograph of the genus Catalpa"), graduating on 3 June 1949 and receiving the title of RNDr. He published his diploma thesis from 1950 to 1954 in seven parts in English as "Synopsis of the genus Catalpa (Bignoniaceae)". As an employee of the Institute of Experimental Phytopathology and Entomology at the Center of Biological and Ecological Sciences of the Slovak Academy of Sciences in Ivanka pri Dunaji, he conducted his doctoral studies as an external student. On 5 June 1972 he received the scientific title of Candidate of Biological Sciences based on his thesis "Defense reactions and premature pathogenic extinction of woody plants".

Jiří Paclt was married to his wife Vera, née Vaněčková (1920–2006), with whom he had three children: the daughters Helena (a high school teacher) and Eva (an economist), and the son Roman (an engineer and programmer). After many years of various health problems, Paclt died on 18 September 2015 at the age of 90.

== Scientific work ==
From 1949 to 1954, Paclt worked as a researcher at the Forest Research Institute in Bratislava. In the following years until 1962, he was a researcher at the Institute of Biology of the Slovak Academy of Sciences in Bratislava, where he first worked in the Faunistic Laboratory, and later in the Zoology Department. He spent almost 30 years of his work life, from 1962 to 1990, at the Institute of Experimental Phytopathology and Entomology in Ivanka pri Dunaji, from where he eventually retired.

Both his diploma and doctoral thesis focused on botanical topics, and Paclt continued with research in botany throughout his work life. His main focuses were phytopathology, cecidogenesis (the forming of galls), non-pathogenic cancer growth, non-pathogenic nodule growth, facultative and obligatory nodosities (root deformations), mycotic causes of wilting of some fruit tree species, and the problem of early death of apricot trees. He was a knowledgeable expert in the research field of flaws of timber, especially the red heartwood core of beeches and the variegation of beech wood.

Throughout his life, Paclt worked on various groups of hexapods. His main groups of interest were springtails, proturans, diplurans, jumping bristletails, silverfish, butterflies and moths, beetles and mayflies, of which he studied the morphology, taxonomy, systematics, ecology and zoogeography.

Among his accomplishments in mineralogy are the record of fichtelite from Slovakia and of subfossil liptobiolite from Israel.

=== Described taxa ===
He described 34 new species and subspecies, 49 genera, three subfamilies and two families, and he introduced 12 nomina nova:

==== Acari – mites and ticks ====
- Belba bartosi Paclt & Winkler, 1961

==== Diplura ====
- Campodea vihorlatensis Paclt, 1961
- Deutojapyx Paclt, 1957
- Didymocampa Paclt, 1957
- Evalljapyx leleuoporum Paclt, 1976
- Japyx ascanius Paclt, 1965
- Japyx izmir Paclt, 1957
- Japyx kosswigi Paclt, 1965
- Japyx turcicus Paclt, 1965
- Acrocampa Paclt, 1957
- Adinocampa Paclt, 1957
- Camachancampa Paclt, 1957
- Catacampa Paclt, 1957
- Chaocampa Paclt, 1957
- Cocytocampa Paclt, 1957, nomen novum for Microcampa Silvestri, 1934
- Dyseocampa Paclt, 1957
- Holocampa Paclt, 1957
- Idiocampa Paclt, 1957
- Metajapyx strouhalae Paclt, 1957
- Mimocampa Paclt, 1957
- Mixocampa Paclt, 1957
- Monojapyx Paclt, 1957
- Notojapyx Paclt, 1957
- Notojapyx tillyardi pagesi Paclt, 1957, nomen novum for Japyx tillyardi relata Womersley, 1939
- Ombrocampa Paclt, 1957
- Pleocampa Paclt, 1957
- Tricampodella Paclt, 1957
- Tychocampa Paclt, 1957
- Ultrajapyx Paclt, 1957
- Plusiocampinae Paclt, 1957
- Syncampinae Paclt, 1957

==== Archaeognatha – jumping bristletails ====
- Haslundichilis beckeri Paclt, 1960
- Hybographitarsus zebu Paclt, 1969
- Hypermeinertellus Paclt, 1969
- Mixomachilis Paclt, 1972, now a synonym of Mesomachilis
- Mixomachilis remingtoni Paclt, 1972, now a synonym of Mesomachilis nearcticus
- Neomachilellus nevermanni Paclt, 1969
- Petridiobius Paclt, 1970
- Petridiobius arcticus Paclt, 1970
- Petrobius canadensis Paclt, 1969
- Pseudomachilanus Paclt, 1969
- Pseudomachilanus sechellarum Paclt, 1969
- Machilontus sutteri borneensis Paclt, 1969
- Petrobiinae Paclt, 1970

==== Collembola – springtails ====
- Aposinella Paclt, 1971
- Choreutinula Paclt, 1944, nomen novum for Beckerella Axelson, 1912
- Cyphoderus trinervoides Paclt, 1965
- Diamantinum Paclt, 1959
- Folsomia anglicana Paclt, 1952
- Folsomia sexoculata Paclt, 1952
- Handschinphysa Paclt, 1945, nomen novum for Microphysa Handschin, 1925
- Neohypogastrura Paclt, 1944
- Odontella arvensis Paclt, 1961
- Pogonognathellus Paclt, 1944, nomen novum for Pogonognathus Boerner, 1908
- Prorastriopes canariensis Paclt, 1964, current generic combination Fasciosminthurus canariensis
- Prorastriopes strasseni Paclt, 1964, current generic combination Fasciosminthurus strasseni
- Prorastriopes webbi Paclt, 1964
- Rastriopes schultzei Paclt, 1959
- Tomocerus terrestralis Paclt, 1957

==== Zygentoma – silverfish ====
- Acanthinonychia Paclt, 1963
- Apteryskenoma Paclt, 1953, nomen novum for Bakerella Womersley, 1928
- Anarithmeus Paclt, 1962
- Anisolepisma Paclt, 1967
- Battigrassiella Paclt, 1963, nomen novum for Grassiella Silvestri, 1912
- Comphotriura Paclt, 1963
- Ctenolepisma boettgeriana Paclt, 1961
- Ctenolepisma confusum Paclt, 1967
- Diabateria Paclt, 1963
- Dodecastyla Paclt, 1974
- Dromadimachilis Paclt, 1969
- Hemilepisma Paclt, 1967, nomen novum for Braunsina Escherich, 1904
- Heteromorphura Paclt, 1963
- Hybographitarsus Paclt, 1969
- Hypermeinertellus weidneri Paclt, 1969
- Lasiotheus Paclt, 1963, a subgenus of Gastrotheus Casey, 1890
- Leniwytsmania Paclt, 1957
- Lepidina dunckeri Paclt, 1974
- Lepidotriura Paclt, 1963
- Metagraphitarsus Paclt, 1969
- Neonicoletia Paclt, 1979
- Neonicoletia quinterensis Paclt, 1979
- Nicoletia phytophila Paclt, 1961
- Paracrotelsa Paclt, 1967
- Proatelurina Paclt, 1963
- Trichodimeria Paclt, 1963
- Tricholepisma Paclt, 1967
- Trinemura subarmata Paclt, 1982
- Trinemurodes mertoni Paclt, 1961
- Verhoeffilis Paclt, 1972
- Wygodzincinus Paclt, 1963

==== Ephemeroptera – mayflies ====
- Ephacerella Paclt, 1994, nomen novum for Acerella Allen, 1971

==== Coleoptera – beetles ====
- Deuteroleptidea Paclt, 1946, nomen novum for Leptidea Mulsant, 1839; an unnecessary replacement name, now synonym of the Cerambycinae genus Nathrius

==== Lepidoptera – butterflies and moths ====
- Eucedestis Paclt, 1951, now a synonym of the ermine moth genus Cedestis
- Eudalacina Paclt, 1953, now a synonym of the ghost moth genus Eudalaca
- Kenneliola Paclt, 1951, nomen novum for Crobylophora Meyrick, 1880; now a synonym of the Tortricidae genus Cydia
- Lossbergiana pseudodimiata Paclt, 1953, now a synonym of the ghost moth Dalaca pallens
- Apodidae Paclt, 1947, a homonym of Apodidae Hartert, 1897; the valid name for Apodidae Paclt, 1947 is Limacodidae
- Chrysoesthiidae Paclt, 1974, now a synonym of the twirler moths subfamily Gelechiinae

==== Aves – birds ====
- Neolepidothrix Paclt, 2009, nomen novum for Lepidothrix Bonaparte, 1854 (Pipridae)

==== Plants ====
- Shiuyinghua Paclt, 1962, currently placed in Paulowniaceae

=== Taxa named after Paclt ===
Several taxa have been named in honor of Jiří Paclt, such as Pseudosinella paclti Rusek, 1961 (Collembola), Litocampa paclti Condé, 1981 (Diplura) and one generic taxon Pacltiobius Kaplin, 1995 (Archaeognatha), currently treated as a subgenus of Petridiobius.

=== Publications ===
Jiří Paclt was a polyglot and published in Czech, Slovak, French, English and German. His very good understanding of Latin and Ancient Greek became evident in his comments on the misrepresentation of scientific names of animals. Furthermore, he did transcriptions from Cyrillic into Latin, but also conversely into Cyrillic, as well as into Japanese, Chinese and Arabic.

When publishing works in Slovakia he often used the name Juraj, the Slovak form of his first name, instead of the Czech form Jiří.

Paclt published more than 350 scientific articles, most of them without any co-author. An extensive bibliography of his bibliography can be found in Matoušek (2015).
