= A. congoanus =

A. congoanus may refer to:

- Abacetus congoanus, a ground beetle
- Afrojapyx congoanus, a dipluran
