= Lopesi =

Lopesi may refer to:

- the former name of Katarraktis, a mountain village in Achaea, Greece
- Lopesi Faagu (born 1960), weightlifter from American Samoa

In biology:

- Adejeania lopesi, a species of tachinid fly found in Brazil
- Austrodiscus lopesi, a fossil species of air-breathing land snail in the family Charopidae, found in Brazil
- Cnemidochroma lopesi, a species of beetle in the family Cerambycidae, found in Brazil
- Corethrella lopesi, a species of midge in the genus Corethrella in the family Corethrellidae
- Culex lopesi, a species of mosquito; see List of Culex species
- Grajahua lopesi, a species of robber fly in the family Asilidae; see List of Asilidae species: G
- Hapljapyx lopesi, a species of dipluran in the genus Hapljapyx in the family Japygidae
- Heniartes lopesi, a species of assassin bug in the genus Heniartes in the family Reduviidae
- Hexatoma lopesis, a species of crane fly in the genus Hexatoma in the family Limoniidae
- Hypsolebias lopesi, a species of rivuline (killifish) in the genus Hypsolebias
- Ischnochiton lopesi, a species of polyplacophoran mollusc in the family Ischnochitonidae; see List of marine molluscs of Brazil
- Leptopteromyia lopesi, a species of robber fly in the genus Leptopteromyia in the family Asilidae; see List of Asilidae species: L
- Megalobulimus lopesi, a species of air-breathing land snail in the family Strophocheilidae, endemic to Brazil
- Moenkhausia lopesi, a species of tetra (fish) in the genus Moenkhausia
- Pegoscapus lopesi, a species of fig wasp in the genus Pegoscapus
- Philornis lopesi, a species of fly in the genus Philornis
- Pritchardia lopesi, a species of robber fly in the genus Pritchardia in the family Asitidae; see List of Asilidae species: P
- Succinea lopesi, a species of air-breathing land snail in the family Succineidae; see List of non-marine molluscs of Brazil
- Syringogaster lopesi, a species of ant-mimicking fly in the genus Syringogaster

== See also ==
- Bradypterus lopezi (AKA Evergreen forest warbler), a species of bird
- Poliolais lopezi (AKA White-tailed warbler), a species of bird
