= Metajapyx peanoi =

Scientific classification
- Domain: Eukaryota
- Kingdom: Animalia
- Phylum: Arthropoda
- Order: Diplura
- Family: Japygidae
- Genus: Metajapyx
- Species: M. peanoi

Binomial name
- Metajapyx peanoi Pages, 1980

Species of two-pronged bristletail

Metajapyx peanoi is a species of forcepstail in the family Japygidae.
