= Nanojapyx hamoni =

Scientific classification
- Domain: Eukaryota
- Kingdom: Animalia
- Phylum: Arthropoda
- Order: Diplura
- Family: Japygidae
- Genus: Nanojapyx
- Species: N. hamoni

Binomial name
- Nanojapyx hamoni Smith, 1959

Species of two-pronged bristletail

Nanojapyx hamoni is a species of forcepstail in the family Japygidae. It is found in North America.
