= Kinabalujapyx =

Scientific classification
- Kingdom: Animalia
- Phylum: Arthropoda
- Class: Entognatha
- Order: Diplura
- Family: Japygidae
- Genus: Kinabalujapyx; Pagés, 1994

Genus of two-pronged bristletails

Kinabalujapyx is a genus of diplurans in the family Japygidae.

== Species ==
- Kinabalujapyx disturbator Pagés, 1994
