= Metajapyx folsomi =

Scientific classification
- Domain: Eukaryota
- Kingdom: Animalia
- Phylum: Arthropoda
- Order: Diplura
- Family: Japygidae
- Genus: Metajapyx
- Species: M. folsomi

Binomial name
- Metajapyx folsomi Silvestri, 1948

Species of two-pronged bristletail

Metajapyx folsomi is a species of forcepstail in the family Japygidae. It is found in North America.
