= Occasjapyx californicus =

Scientific classification
- Domain: Eukaryota
- Kingdom: Animalia
- Phylum: Arthropoda
- Order: Diplura
- Family: Japygidae
- Genus: Occasjapyx
- Species: O. californicus

Binomial name
- Occasjapyx californicus Silvestri, 1948

Species of two-pronged bristletail

Occasjapyx californicus is a species of forcepstail in the family Japygidae. It is found in North America.
