= Hecajapyx vulgaris =

Scientific classification
- Domain: Eukaryota
- Kingdom: Animalia
- Phylum: Arthropoda
- Order: Diplura
- Family: Japygidae
- Genus: Hecajapyx
- Species: H. vulgaris

Binomial name
- Hecajapyx vulgaris Smith, 1959

Species of two-pronged bristletail

Hecajapyx vulgaris is a species of forcepstail in the family Japygidae. It is found in North America.
