= Indjapyx novaecaledoniae =

Scientific classification
- Domain: Eukaryota
- Kingdom: Animalia
- Phylum: Arthropoda
- Order: Diplura
- Family: Japygidae
- Genus: Indjapyx
- Species: I. novaecaledoniae

Binomial name
- Indjapyx novaecaledoniae Silvestri, 1948

Species of two-pronged bristletail

Indjapyx novaecaledoniae is a species of forcepstail in the family Japygidae.
