= Mixojapyx impar =

Scientific classification
- Domain: Eukaryota
- Kingdom: Animalia
- Phylum: Arthropoda
- Order: Diplura
- Family: Japygidae
- Genus: Mixojapyx
- Species: M. impar

Binomial name
- Mixojapyx impar Silvestri, 1948

Species of two-pronged bristletail

Mixojapyx impar is a species of forcepstail in the family Japygidae. It is found in North America.
