= Metajapyx magnifimbriatus =

Scientific classification
- Domain: Eukaryota
- Kingdom: Animalia
- Phylum: Arthropoda
- Order: Diplura
- Family: Japygidae
- Genus: Metajapyx
- Species: M. magnifimbriatus

Binomial name
- Metajapyx magnifimbriatus Muegge & Bernard, 1990

Species of two-pronged bristletail

Metajapyx magnifimbriatus is a species of forcepstail in the family Japygidae. It is found in North America.
