= Occasjapyx americanus =

Scientific classification
- Domain: Eukaryota
- Kingdom: Animalia
- Phylum: Arthropoda
- Order: Diplura
- Family: Japygidae
- Genus: Occasjapyx
- Species: O. americanus

Binomial name
- Occasjapyx americanus (MacGillivary, 1893)

Species of two-pronged bristletail

Occasjapyx americanus is a species of forcepstail in the family Japygidae. It is found in North America.
