= Mixojapyx dampfi =

Scientific classification
- Domain: Eukaryota
- Kingdom: Animalia
- Phylum: Arthropoda
- Order: Diplura
- Family: Japygidae
- Genus: Mixojapyx
- Species: M. dampfi

Binomial name
- Mixojapyx dampfi Silvestri, 1948

Species of two-pronged bristletail

Mixojapyx dampfi is a species of forcepstail in the family Japygidae. It is found in Central America.
