= Evalljapyx dolichodduus =

Scientific classification
- Domain: Eukaryota
- Kingdom: Animalia
- Phylum: Arthropoda
- Order: Diplura
- Family: Japygidae
- Genus: Evalljapyx
- Species: E. dolichodduus

Binomial name
- Evalljapyx dolichodduus Silvestri, 1911

Species of two-pronged bristletail

Evalljapyx dolichodduus is a species of forcepstail in the family Japygidae. It is found in Central America.
