= Occasjapyx kofoidi =

Scientific classification
- Domain: Eukaryota
- Kingdom: Animalia
- Phylum: Arthropoda
- Order: Diplura
- Family: Japygidae
- Genus: Occasjapyx
- Species: O. kofoidi

Binomial name
- Occasjapyx kofoidi (Silvestri, 1928)

Species of two-pronged bristletail

Occasjapyx kofoidi is a species of forcepstail in the family Japygidae. It is found in North America.
