= Occasjapyx carltoni =

Scientific classification
- Domain: Eukaryota
- Kingdom: Animalia
- Phylum: Arthropoda
- Order: Diplura
- Family: Japygidae
- Genus: Occasjapyx
- Species: O. carltoni

Binomial name
- Occasjapyx carltoni Allen, 1988

Species of two-pronged bristletail

Occasjapyx carltoni is a species of forcepstail in the family Japygidae. It is found in North America.
