= Metajapyx besucheti =

Scientific classification
- Domain: Eukaryota
- Kingdom: Animalia
- Phylum: Arthropoda
- Order: Diplura
- Family: Japygidae
- Genus: Metajapyx
- Species: M. besucheti

Binomial name
- Metajapyx besucheti Pages, 1978

Species of two-pronged bristletail

Metajapyx besucheti is a species of forcepstail in the family Japygidae.

== Subspecies ==
These two subspecies belong to the species Metajapyx besucheti:

- Metajapyx besucheti besucheti Pages, 1978
- Metajapyx besucheti venetus Pages, 1993
