= Evalljapyx macswaini =

Scientific classification
- Kingdom: Animalia
- Phylum: Arthropoda
- Class: Entognatha
- Order: Diplura
- Family: Japygidae
- Genus: Evalljapyx
- Species: E. macswaini

Binomial name
- Evalljapyx macswaini Smith, 1960

Species of two-pronged bristletail

Evalljapyx macswaini is a species of forcepstail in the family Japygidae. It is found in North America.
