= Catajapyx confusus =

Scientific classification
- Domain: Eukaryota
- Kingdom: Animalia
- Phylum: Arthropoda
- Order: Diplura
- Family: Japygidae
- Genus: Catajapyx
- Species: C. confusus

Binomial name
- Catajapyx confusus (Silvestri, 1929)

Species of two-pronged bristletail

Catajapyx confusus is a species of forcepstail in the family Japygidae.

== Subspecies ==
These five subspecies belong to the species Catajapyx confusus:

- Catajapyx confusus aegea (Silvestri, 1932)
- Catajapyx confusus aquilonaris (Silvestri, 1931)
- Catajapyx confusus confusus (Silvestri, 1929)
- Catajapyx confusus moravica (Kratochvil, 1946)
- Catajapyx confusus rumena (Silvestri, 1931)
