= Dipljapyx beroni =

Scientific classification
- Domain: Eukaryota
- Kingdom: Animalia
- Phylum: Arthropoda
- Order: Diplura
- Family: Japygidae
- Genus: Dipljapyx
- Species: D. beroni

Binomial name
- Dipljapyx beroni Pagés, 1974

Species of two-pronged bristletail

Dipljapyx beroni is a species of forcepstail in the family Japygidae.
