= Catajapyx aquilonaris =

Scientific classification
- Domain: Eukaryota
- Kingdom: Animalia
- Phylum: Arthropoda
- Order: Diplura
- Family: Japygidae
- Genus: Catajapyx
- Species: C. aquilonaris

Binomial name
- Catajapyx aquilonaris (Silvestri, 1929)

Species of two-pronged bristletail

Catajapyx aquilonaris is a species of forcepstail in the family Japygidae.
