= D. variabilis =

D. variabilis may refer to:

- Dalaca variabilis, a moth species found in Chile
- Dendrobates variabilis, a frog species endemic to Peru
- Dermacentor variabilis, the American dog tick, a tick species found in North America
- Diplolepis variabilis, a plant species in the genus Diplolepis
- Donax variabilis, a mollusc species found on the east coast of the United States from Virginia to the Caribbean
