= Metajapyx steevesi =

Scientific classification
- Kingdom: Animalia
- Phylum: Arthropoda
- Class: Entognatha
- Order: Diplura
- Family: Japygidae
- Genus: Metajapyx
- Species: M. steevesi

Binomial name
- Metajapyx steevesi Smith & Bolton, 1964

Species of two-pronged bristletail

Metajapyx steevesi is a species of forcepstail in the family Japygidae. It is found in North America.
