= Metajapyx inductus =

Scientific classification
- Domain: Eukaryota
- Kingdom: Animalia
- Phylum: Arthropoda
- Order: Diplura
- Family: Japygidae
- Genus: Metajapyx
- Species: M. inductus

Binomial name
- Metajapyx inductus (Silvestri, 1932)

Species of two-pronged bristletail

Metajapyx inductus is a species of forcepstail in the family Japygidae.
