= Metajapyx siculus =

Scientific classification
- Domain: Eukaryota
- Kingdom: Animalia
- Phylum: Arthropoda
- Order: Diplura
- Family: Japygidae
- Genus: Metajapyx
- Species: M. siculus

Binomial name
- Metajapyx siculus (Verhoeff, 1923)

Species of two-pronged bristletail

Metajapyx siculus is a species of forcepstail in the family Japygidae.
