= Metajapyx subterraneus =

Scientific classification
- Domain: Eukaryota
- Kingdom: Animalia
- Phylum: Arthropoda
- Order: Diplura
- Family: Japygidae
- Genus: Metajapyx
- Species: M. subterraneus

Binomial name
- Metajapyx subterraneus (Packard, 1874)

Species of two-pronged bristletail

Metajapyx subterraneus is a species of forcepstail in the family Japygidae. It is found in North America.
