= Evalljapyx hubbardi =

Scientific classification
- Domain: Eukaryota
- Kingdom: Animalia
- Phylum: Arthropoda
- Order: Diplura
- Family: Japygidae
- Genus: Evalljapyx
- Species: E. hubbardi

Binomial name
- Evalljapyx hubbardi (Cook, 1899)

Species of two-pronged bristletail

Evalljapyx hubbardi is a species of forcepstail in the family Japygidae. It is found in North America.
