= Holjapyx calaverasae =

Scientific classification
- Domain: Eukaryota
- Kingdom: Animalia
- Phylum: Arthropoda
- Order: Diplura
- Family: Japygidae
- Genus: Holjapyx
- Species: H. calaverasae

Binomial name
- Holjapyx calaverasae Smith, 1959

Species of two-pronged bristletail

Holjapyx calaverasae is a species of forcepstail in the family Japygidae. It is found in North America.
