= Ctenjapyx parkeri =

Scientific classification
- Kingdom: Animalia
- Phylum: Arthropoda
- Class: Entognatha
- Order: Diplura
- Family: Japygidae
- Genus: Ctenjapyx
- Species: C. parkeri

Binomial name
- Ctenjapyx parkeri Smith, 1964

Species of two-pronged bristletail

Ctenjapyx parkeri is a species of forcepstail in the family Japygidae. It is found in Central America.
