= Dipljapyx fagniezi =

Scientific classification
- Domain: Eukaryota
- Kingdom: Animalia
- Phylum: Arthropoda
- Order: Diplura
- Family: Japygidae
- Genus: Dipljapyx
- Species: D. fagniezi

Binomial name
- Dipljapyx fagniezi Pagés, 1952

Species of two-pronged bristletail

Dipljapyx fagniezi is a species of forcepstail in the family Japygidae.
