= Metajapyx moroderi =

Scientific classification
- Domain: Eukaryota
- Kingdom: Animalia
- Phylum: Arthropoda
- Order: Diplura
- Family: Japygidae
- Genus: Metajapyx
- Species: M. moroderi

Binomial name
- Metajapyx moroderi (Silvestri, 1929)

Species of two-pronged bristletail

Metajapyx moroderi is a species of forcepstail in the family Japygidae.
