= Dipljapyx sardous =

Scientific classification
- Domain: Eukaryota
- Kingdom: Animalia
- Phylum: Arthropoda
- Order: Diplura
- Family: Japygidae
- Genus: Dipljapyx
- Species: D. sardous

Binomial name
- Dipljapyx sardous Silvestri, 1948

Species of two-pronged bristletail

Dipljapyx sardous is a species of forcepstail in the family Japygidae.
