= Occasjapyx sierrensis =

Scientific classification
- Domain: Eukaryota
- Kingdom: Animalia
- Phylum: Arthropoda
- Order: Diplura
- Family: Japygidae
- Genus: Occasjapyx
- Species: O. sierrensis

Binomial name
- Occasjapyx sierrensis Smith, 1959

Species of two-pronged bristletail

Occasjapyx sierrensis is a species of forcepstail in the family Japygidae. It is found in North America.
