= Evalljapyx dispar =

Scientific classification
- Domain: Eukaryota
- Kingdom: Animalia
- Phylum: Arthropoda
- Order: Diplura
- Family: Japygidae
- Genus: Evalljapyx
- Species: E. dispar

Binomial name
- Evalljapyx dispar Silvestri, 1947

Species of two-pronged bristletail

Evalljapyx dispar is a species of forcepstail in the family Japygidae. It is found in North America.
