= Metajapyx viti =

Scientific classification
- Domain: Eukaryota
- Kingdom: Animalia
- Phylum: Arthropoda
- Order: Diplura
- Family: Japygidae
- Genus: Metajapyx
- Species: M. viti

Binomial name
- Metajapyx viti Pages, 1993

Species of two-pronged bristletail

Metajapyx viti is a species of forcepstail in the family Japygidae.
