= Metajapyx confectus =

Scientific classification
- Domain: Eukaryota
- Kingdom: Animalia
- Phylum: Arthropoda
- Order: Diplura
- Family: Japygidae
- Genus: Metajapyx
- Species: M. confectus

Binomial name
- Metajapyx confectus Silvestri, 1947

Species of two-pronged bristletail

Metajapyx confectus is a species of forcepstail in the family Japygidae. It is found in North America.
