= Indjapyx sharpi =

Scientific classification
- Domain: Eukaryota
- Kingdom: Animalia
- Phylum: Arthropoda
- Order: Diplura
- Family: Japygidae
- Genus: Indjapyx
- Species: I. sharpi

Binomial name
- Indjapyx sharpi (Silvestri, 1904)

Species of two-pronged bristletail

Indjapyx sharpi is a species of forcepstail in the family Japygidae. It is found in Oceania.
