= Catajapyx ewingi =

Scientific classification
- Domain: Eukaryota
- Kingdom: Animalia
- Phylum: Arthropoda
- Order: Diplura
- Family: Japygidae
- Genus: Catajapyx
- Species: C. ewingi

Binomial name
- Catajapyx ewingi Fox, 1941

Species of two-pronged bristletail

Catajapyx ewingi is a species of forcepstail in the family Japygidae. It is found in North America.
