= Catajapyx singularis =

Scientific classification
- Domain: Eukaryota
- Kingdom: Animalia
- Phylum: Arthropoda
- Order: Diplura
- Family: Japygidae
- Genus: Catajapyx
- Species: C. singularis

Binomial name
- Catajapyx singularis Pages, 1983

Species of two-pronged bristletail

Catajapyx singularis is a species of forcepstail in the family Japygidae.
