= Mixojapyx tridenticulatus =

Scientific classification
- Domain: Eukaryota
- Kingdom: Animalia
- Phylum: Arthropoda
- Order: Diplura
- Family: Japygidae
- Genus: Mixojapyx
- Species: M. tridenticulatus

Binomial name
- Mixojapyx tridenticulatus (Fox, 1941)

Species of two-pronged bristletail

Mixojapyx tridenticulatus is a species of forcepstail in the family Japygidae. It is found in North America.

== Subspecies ==
These two subspecies belong to the species Mixojapyx tridenticulatus:

- Mixojapyx tridenticulatus superior Silvestri, 1948
- Mixojapyx tridenticulatus tridenticulatus (Fox, 1941)
