= Evalljapyx leechi =

Scientific classification
- Kingdom: Animalia
- Phylum: Arthropoda
- Class: Entognatha
- Order: Diplura
- Family: Japygidae
- Genus: Evalljapyx
- Species: E. leechi

Binomial name
- Evalljapyx leechi Smith, 1960

Species of two-pronged bristletail

Evalljapyx leechi is a species of forcepstail in the family Japygidae. It is found in North America.
