= Holjapyx insiccatus =

Scientific classification
- Domain: Eukaryota
- Kingdom: Animalia
- Phylum: Arthropoda
- Order: Diplura
- Family: Japygidae
- Genus: Holjapyx
- Species: H. insiccatus

Binomial name
- Holjapyx insiccatus Smith, 1959

Species of two-pronged bristletail

Holjapyx insiccatus is a species of forcepstail in the family Japygidae. It is found in North America.
