= T. bidentata =

T. bidentata may refer to:

- Tanaocheles bidentata, a crab in which the genital openings are on the sternum in females, but on the legs in males
- Trapezia bidentata, a guard crab
- Turneria bidentata, an ant with a single petiole
- Typhlolabia bidentata, a two-pronged bristletail
