= Indjapyx indicus =

Scientific classification
- Domain: Eukaryota
- Kingdom: Animalia
- Phylum: Arthropoda
- Order: Diplura
- Family: Japygidae
- Genus: Indjapyx
- Species: I. indicus

Binomial name
- Indjapyx indicus (Oudemans, 1891)

Species of two-pronged bristletail

Indjapyx indicus is a species of forcepstail in the family Japygidae.

== Subspecies ==
These two subspecies belong to the species Indjapyx indicus:

- Indjapyx indicus indicus
- Indjapyx indicus modestus Pagès, 1978
