= Dipljapyx hirpinus =

Scientific classification
- Domain: Eukaryota
- Kingdom: Animalia
- Phylum: Arthropoda
- Order: Diplura
- Family: Japygidae
- Genus: Dipljapyx
- Species: D. hirpinus

Binomial name
- Dipljapyx hirpinus Silvestri, 1948

Species of two-pronged bristletail

Dipljapyx hirpinus is a species of forcepstail in the family Japygidae.
