= Dalaca =

Scientific classification
- Domain: Eukaryota
- Kingdom: Animalia
- Phylum: Arthropoda
- Class: Insecta
- Order: Lepidoptera
- Family: Hepialidae
- Genus: Dalaca; Walker, 1856

Synonyms
- Huapina Bryk, 1945; Maculella Viette, 1950; Toenga Tindale, 1954

Genus of moths

Dalaca is a genus of moths of the family Hepialidae. There are 23 described species found throughout South America as far north as Panama. The larvae feed on grasses.

== Species ==
- Dalaca chilensis - Chile
- Dalaca chiriquensis - Panama
- Dalaca cocama - Peru
- Dalaca crocatus - Chile
- Dalaca cuprifera - Peru
- Dalaca guarani - Brazil
- Dalaca katharinae - Brazil
- Dalaca laminata - Chile
- Dalaca manoa - Colombia
- Dalaca mummia - Brazil
- Dalaca niepelti - Ecuador
- Dalaca nigricornis - Chile
- Dalaca obliquestrigata - Peru
- Dalaca pallens - Chile
- Dalaca parafuscus - Chile
- Dalaca patriciae - Argentina
- Dalaca perkeo - Colombia
- Dalaca postvariabilis - Argentina
- Dalaca quadricornis - Argentina
- Dalaca stigmatica - Paraguay
- Dalaca usaque - Colombia
- Dalaca variabilis - Chile
- Dalaca vibicata - Ecuador

== Former species ==
- Dalaca tapuja
