= Evalljapyx bolivari =

Scientific classification
- Domain: Eukaryota
- Kingdom: Animalia
- Phylum: Arthropoda
- Order: Diplura
- Family: Japygidae
- Genus: Evalljapyx
- Species: E. bolivari

Binomial name
- Evalljapyx bolivari Silvestri, 1948

Species of forcepstail

Evalljapyx bolivari is a species of forcepstail in the family Japygidae. It is found in Central America.
