= Hecajapyx bucketti =

Scientific classification
- Kingdom: Animalia
- Phylum: Arthropoda
- Class: Entognatha
- Order: Diplura
- Family: Japygidae
- Genus: Hecajapyx
- Species: H. bucketti

Binomial name
- Hecajapyx bucketti Smith, 1964

Species of two-pronged bristletail

Hecajapyx bucketti is a species of forcepstail in the family Japygidae. It is found in North America.
