= Evalljapyx anombris =

Scientific classification
- Domain: Eukaryota
- Kingdom: Animalia
- Phylum: Arthropoda
- Order: Diplura
- Family: Japygidae
- Genus: Evalljapyx
- Species: E. anombris

Binomial name
- Evalljapyx anombris Smith, 1960

Species of two-pronged bristletail

Evalljapyx anombris is a species of forcepstail in the family Japygidae.
