= Parindjapyx chiorandoi =

Scientific classification
- Domain: Eukaryota
- Kingdom: Animalia
- Phylum: Arthropoda
- Order: Diplura
- Family: Japygidae
- Genus: Parindjapyx
- Species: P. chiorandoi

Binomial name
- Parindjapyx chiorandoi Silvestri, 1932

Species of two-pronged bristletail

Parindjapyx chiorandoi is a species of forcepstail in the family Japygidae.
