= Gallojapyx =

Scientific classification
- Kingdom: Animalia
- Phylum: Arthropoda
- Class: Entognatha
- Order: Diplura
- Family: Japygidae
- Genus: Gallojapyx; Pagés, 1993

Genus of two-pronged bristletails

Gallojapyx is a genus of diplurans in the family Japygidae.

== Species ==
- Gallojapyx iocosus Pagés, 1993
