= Austrjapyx =

Scientific classification
- Kingdom: Animalia
- Phylum: Arthropoda
- Class: Entognatha
- Order: Diplura
- Family: Japygidae
- Genus: Austrjapyx; Silvestri, 1948

Genus of two-pronged bristletails

Austrjapyx is a genus of diplurans in the family Japygidae.

== Species ==
- Austrjapyx aberrans Silvestri, 1948
- Austrjapyx autuorii Silvestri, 1948
- Austrjapyx barberoi Silvestri, 1948
- Austrjapyx bitancourtii Silvestri, 1948
- Austrjapyx chapecoi Smith & González, 1964
- Austrjapyx degradans Silvestri, 1948
- Austrjapyx descolei Silvestri, 1948
- Austrjapyx lilloi Silvestri, 1948
- Austrjapyx neotropicalis (Silvestri, 1902)
- Austrjapyx parvulus Silvestri, 1948
- Austrjapyx peluffoi Silvestri, 1948
- Austrjapyx rochalimai Silvestri, 1948
- Austrjapyx teutonius Smith & González, 1964
- Austrjapyx travassosi Silvestri, 1948
