= Opisthjapyx =

Scientific classification
- Kingdom: Animalia
- Phylum: Arthropoda
- Class: Entognatha
- Order: Diplura
- Family: Japygidae
- Genus: Opisthjapyx; Silvestri, 1929

Genus of two-pronged bristletails

Opisthjapyx is a genus of diplurans in the family Japygidae.

== Species ==
- Opisthjapyx seurati Silvestri, 1929
