= Catajapyx =

Scientific classification
- Domain: Eukaryota
- Kingdom: Animalia
- Phylum: Arthropoda
- Order: Diplura
- Family: Japygidae
- Subfamily: Japyginae
- Genus: Catajapyx; Silvestri, 1933

Genus of two-pronged bristletails

Catajapyx is a genus of diplurans in the family Japygidae.

== Species ==
- Catajapyx aquilonaris (Silvestri, 1931)
- Catajapyx confusus (Silvestri, 1929)
- Catajapyx ewingi Fox, 1941
- Catajapyx jeanneli Silvestri, 1934
- Catajapyx propinquus Silvestri, 1948
- Catajapyx singularis Pagés, 1983
