= Penjapyx =

Scientific classification
- Domain: Eukaryota
- Kingdom: Animalia
- Phylum: Arthropoda
- Order: Diplura
- Family: Japygidae
- Genus: Penjapyx; Smith, 1962

Genus of two-pronged bristletails

Penjapyx is a genus of diplurans in the family Japygidae.

== Species ==
- Penjapyx altus Smith, 1962
- Penjapyx castrii González & Smith, 1964
