= Mesomachilis nearctica =

Scientific classification
- Kingdom: Animalia
- Phylum: Arthropoda
- Clade: Pancrustacea
- Class: Insecta
- Order: Archaeognatha
- Family: Machilidae
- Genus: Mesomachilis
- Species: M. nearctica

Binomial name
- Mesomachilis nearctica Silvestri, 1911

Species of archaeognatha

Mesomachilis nearctica is a species in the genus Mesomachilis of the family Machilidae which belongs to the insect order Archaeognatha (jumping bristletails)
