= Ctenjapyx =

Scientific classification
- Domain: Eukaryota
- Kingdom: Animalia
- Phylum: Arthropoda
- Order: Diplura
- Family: Japygidae
- Subfamily: Provalljapyginae
- Genus: Ctenjapyx; Silvestri, 1948

Genus of two-pronged bristletails

Ctenjapyx is a genus of diplurans in the family Japygidae.

== Species ==
- Ctenjapyx boneti Silvestri, 1948
- Ctenjapyx parkeri Smith, 1964
