= Dalaca patriciae =

Scientific classification
- Kingdom: Animalia
- Phylum: Arthropoda
- Class: Insecta
- Order: Lepidoptera
- Family: Hepialidae
- Genus: Dalaca
- Species: D. patriciae

Binomial name
- Dalaca patriciae Nielsen and Robinson, 1983

Species of moth

Dalaca patriciae is a species of moth of the family Hepialidae. It is known from Argentina.
