= Chiljapyx =

Scientific classification
- Kingdom: Animalia
- Phylum: Arthropoda
- Class: Entognatha
- Order: Diplura
- Family: Japygidae
- Genus: Chiljapyx; Smith, 1962

Genus of two-pronged bristletails

Chiljapyx is a genus of diplurans in the family Japygidae.

== Species ==
- Chiljapyx clatagironei Smith, 1962
