= Centrjapyx =

Scientific classification
- Kingdom: Animalia
- Phylum: Arthropoda
- Class: Entognatha
- Order: Diplura
- Family: Japygidae
- Genus: Centrjapyx; Silvestri, 1948

Genus of two-pronged bristletails

Centrjapyx is a genus of diplurans in the family Japygidae.

== Species ==
- Centrjapyx mahunkorum Pagés, 1982
- Centrjapyx tristani (Silvestri, 1929)
