= Cnemidochroma coeruleum =

Scientific classification
- Domain: Eukaryota
- Kingdom: Animalia
- Phylum: Arthropoda
- Class: Insecta
- Order: Coleoptera
- Suborder: Polyphaga
- Infraorder: Cucujiformia
- Family: Cerambycidae
- Genus: Cnemidochroma
- Species: C. coeruleum

Binomial name
- Cnemidochroma coeruleum (Achard, 1910)

Synonyms
- Cnemidochroma fulgidum (Schmidt, 1924)

Species of beetle

Cnemidochroma coeruleum is a species of beetle in the family Cerambycidae . It was described by Achard in 1910. It is known from Suriname, French Guiana, and Brazil.
