= Petridiobius canadensis =

Scientific classification
- Kingdom: Animalia
- Phylum: Arthropoda
- Clade: Pancrustacea
- Class: Insecta
- Order: Archaeognatha
- Family: Machilidae
- Genus: Petridiobius
- Species: P. canadensis

Binomial name
- Petridiobius canadensis Sturm, 2001

Species of archaeognatha

Petridiobius canadensis is a species in the genus Petridiobius of the family Machilidae which belongs to the insect order Archaeognatha (jumping bristletails).
