= Hutanjapyx =

Scientific classification
- Kingdom: Animalia
- Phylum: Arthropoda
- Class: Entognatha
- Order: Diplura
- Family: Japygidae
- Genus: Hutanjapyx; Pagés, 1995

Genus of two-pronged bristletails

Hutanjapyx is a genus of diplurans in the family Japygidae.

== Species ==
- Hutanjapyx simpan Pagés, 1995
