= Unjapyx =

Scientific classification
- Kingdom: Animalia
- Phylum: Arthropoda
- Class: Entognatha
- Order: Diplura
- Family: Japygidae
- Genus: Unjapyx; Silvestri, 1948

Genus of two-pronged bristletails

Unjapyx is a genus of diplurans in the family Japygidae.

== Species ==
- Unjapyx clayae Pagés, 1978
- Unjapyx mussardi Pagés, 1993
- Unjapyx simplicior (Silvestri, 1929)
- Unjapyx turbator Pagés, 1993
