= Eojapyx =

Scientific classification
- Kingdom: Animalia
- Phylum: Arthropoda
- Class: Entognatha
- Order: Diplura
- Family: Japygidae
- Genus: Eojapyx; Smith, 1960

Genus of two-pronged bristletails

Eojapyx is a genus of diplurans in the family Japygidae.

== Species ==
- Eojapyx pedis Smith, 1960
