= Holjapyx =

Scientific classification
- Kingdom: Animalia
- Phylum: Arthropoda
- Class: Entognatha
- Order: Diplura
- Family: Japygidae
- Genus: Holjapyx; Silvestri, 1948

Genus of two-pronged bristletails

Holjapyx is a genus of diplurans in the family Japygidae.

== Species ==
- Holjapyx calaverasae Smith, 1959
- Holjapyx conspersus Smith, 1959
- Holjapyx diversiunguis (Silvestri, 1911)
- Holjapyx forsteri Pagés, 1952
- Holjapyx humidus Smith, 1959
- Holjapyx hyadis Smith, 1959
- Holjapyx imbutus Smith, 1959
- Holjapyx insiccatus Smith, 1959
- Holjapyx irroratus Smith, 1959
- Holjapyx madidus Smith, 1959
- Holjapyx nimiipuu Sendra, 2026
- Holjapyx punamuensis Pagés, 1952
- Holjapyx schusteri Smith, 1959
