= Mesjapyx =

Scientific classification
- Kingdom: Animalia
- Phylum: Arthropoda
- Class: Entognatha
- Order: Diplura
- Family: Japygidae
- Genus: Mesjapyx; Silvestri, 1948

Genus of two-pronged bristletails

Mesjapyx is a genus of diplurans in the family Japygidae.

== Species ==
- Mesjapyx afrinus Silvestri, 1948
- Mesjapyx immsi (Silvestri, 1931)
- Mesjapyx silvestris (Carpenter, 1916)
