= Rectojapyx =

Scientific classification
- Kingdom: Animalia
- Phylum: Arthropoda
- Class: Entognatha
- Order: Diplura
- Family: Japygidae
- Genus: Rectojapyx; Pagés, 1954

Genus of two-pronged bristletails

Rectojapyx is a genus of diplurans in the family Japygidae.

== Species ==
- Rectojapyx herzegovinensis (Verhoeff, 1923)
