= Cnemidochroma phyllopus =

Scientific classification
- Kingdom: Animalia
- Phylum: Arthropoda
- Clade: Pancrustacea
- Class: Insecta
- Order: Coleoptera
- Suborder: Polyphaga
- Infraorder: Cucujiformia
- Family: Cerambycidae
- Genus: Cnemidochroma
- Species: C. phyllopus

Binomial name
- Cnemidochroma phyllopus (Guérin-Méneville, 1844)

Synonyms
- Cnemidochroma corvina Burmeister, 1865

Species of beetle

Cnemidochroma phyllopus is a species of beetle in the family Cerambycidae. It was described by Félix Édouard Guérin-Méneville in 1844. It is known from southeastern Brazil, Paraguay, Argentina, and Uruguay.
