= Neojapyx =

Scientific classification
- Kingdom: Animalia
- Phylum: Arthropoda
- Class: Entognatha
- Order: Diplura
- Family: Japygidae
- Genus: Neojapyx; Silvestri, 1933

Genus of two-pronged bristletails

Neojapyx is a genus of diplurans in the family Japygidae.

== Species ==
- Neojapyx centralis (Silvestri, 1902)
- Neojapyx guianae Silvestri, 1933
- Neojapyx insulanus Silvestri, 1948
- Neojapyx ortonedae Silvestri, 1948
- Neojapyx tropicalis Ewing & Fox, 1942
