= Dalaca katharinae =

Scientific classification
- Domain: Eukaryota
- Kingdom: Animalia
- Phylum: Arthropoda
- Class: Insecta
- Order: Lepidoptera
- Family: Hepialidae
- Genus: Dalaca
- Species: D. katharinae

Binomial name
- Dalaca katharinae Pfitzner, 1914

Species of moth

Dalaca katharinae is a species of moth of the family Hepialidae. It is known from Brazil.
