= Mesomachilis californica =

Scientific classification
- Kingdom: Animalia
- Phylum: Arthropoda
- Clade: Pancrustacea
- Class: Insecta
- Order: Archaeognatha
- Family: Machilidae
- Genus: Mesomachilis
- Species: M. californica

Binomial name
- Mesomachilis californica Sturm, 1991

Species of archaeognatha

Mesomachilis californica is a species in the genus Mesomachilis of the family Machilidae which belongs to the insect order Archaeognatha (jumping bristletails)
