= Dalaca parafuscus =

Scientific classification
- Kingdom: Animalia
- Phylum: Arthropoda
- Class: Insecta
- Order: Lepidoptera
- Family: Hepialidae
- Genus: Dalaca
- Species: D. parafuscus

Binomial name
- Dalaca parafuscus Nielsen, Robinson & Wagner, 2000

Synonyms
- Hepialus fuscus Mabille, 1885 (Preocc.)

Species of moth

Dalaca parafuscus is a species of moth of the family Hepialidae. It is known from Chile.
