= Megajapyx =

Scientific classification
- Kingdom: Animalia
- Phylum: Arthropoda
- Class: Entognatha
- Order: Diplura
- Family: Japygidae
- Genus: Megajapyx; Verhoeff, 1904

Genus of two-pronged bristletails

Megajapyx is a genus of diplurans in the family Japygidae.

== Species ==
- Megajapyx aharonii (Verhoeff, 1923)
- Megajapyx gigas (Brauer, 1869)
- Megajapyx lagoi (Silvestri, 1931)
- Megajapyx rhodianus Silvestri, 1933
- Megajapyx solerii (Silvestri, 1931)
