= Atlasjapyx =

Scientific classification
- Kingdom: Animalia
- Phylum: Arthropoda
- Class: Entognatha
- Order: Diplura
- Family: Japygidae
- Genus: Atlasjapyx; Chou & Huang, 1986

Genus of two-pronged bristletails

Atlasjapyx is a genus of diplurans in the family Japygidae.

== Species ==
- Atlasjapyx atlas Chou & Huang, 1986
