= Indjapyx =

Scientific classification
- Domain: Eukaryota
- Kingdom: Animalia
- Phylum: Arthropoda
- Order: Diplura
- Family: Japygidae
- Genus: Indjapyx; Silvestri, 1931

Genus of two-pronged bristletails

Indjapyx is a genus of diplurans in the family Japygidae.

== Species ==
- Indjapyx agathis Pagés, 2002
- Indjapyx annandalei Silvestri, 1931
- Indjapyx bakeri (Silvestri, 1928)
- Indjapyx besucheti Pagés, 1984
- Indjapyx bogorensis Pagés, 2002
- Indjapyx ceylonicus Silvestri, 1931
- Indjapyx crockerianus Pagés, 1994
- Indjapyx duporti (Silvestri, 1928)
- Indjapyx goodenoughensis Womersley, 1945
- Indjapyx gravelyi Silvestri, 1931
- Indjapyx harrisoni Silvestri, 1936
- Indjapyx heteronotus Silvestri, 1931
- Indjapyx indicus (Oudemans, 1891)
- Indjapyx kraepelini Silvestri, 1930
- Indjapyx loebli Pagés, 1984
- Indjapyx mussardi Pagés, 1984
- Indjapyx novaecaledoniae Silvestri, 1948
- Indjapyx perturbator Pagés, 1978
- Indjapyx petrunkevitchi Silvestri, 1936
- Indjapyx pinicola Pagés, 2002
- Indjapyx polettii (Silvestri, 1928)
- Indjapyx pruthii Silvestri, 1931
- Indjapyx samosir Pagés, 2002
- Indjapyx seymourii Silvestri, 1931
- Indjapyx sharpi (Silvestri, 1904)
- Indjapyx silvestrii Pagés, 1984
- Indjapyx simalungun Pagés, 2002
- Indjapyx singapura Pagés, 2002
- Indjapyx sumatranus (Silvestri, 1916)
- Indjapyx taprobanicus Silvestri, 1931
- Indjapyx uvianus Pagés, 1984
- Indjapyx vadoni Pagés, 1955
- Indjapyx yoshii Pagés, 1994
