= Dalaca mummia =

Scientific classification
- Domain: Eukaryota
- Kingdom: Animalia
- Phylum: Arthropoda
- Class: Insecta
- Order: Lepidoptera
- Family: Hepialidae
- Genus: Dalaca
- Species: D. mummia

Binomial name
- Dalaca mummia Schaus, 1892

Synonyms
- Dalaca mummea Pfitzner, 1937

Species of moth

Dalaca mummia is a species of moth of the family Hepialidae. It is known from Brazil.
