= Japygianus =

Scientific classification
- Kingdom: Animalia
- Phylum: Arthropoda
- Class: Entognatha
- Order: Diplura
- Family: Japygidae
- Genus: Japygianus; Silvestri, 1947

Genus of two-pronged bristletails

Japygianus is a genus of diplurans in the family Japygidae.

== Species ==
- Japygianus wheeleri Silvestri, 1947
