= Mixojapyx =

Scientific classification
- Domain: Eukaryota
- Kingdom: Animalia
- Phylum: Arthropoda
- Order: Diplura
- Family: Japygidae
- Genus: Mixojapyx; Silvestri, 1933

Genus of two-pronged bristletails

Mixojapyx is a genus of diplurans in the family Japygidae.

== Species ==
- Mixojapyx barberi Ewing & Fox, 1942
- Mixojapyx conspicuus Silvestri, 1933
- Mixojapyx cooki Ewing & Fox, 1942
- Mixojapyx dampfi Silvestri, 1948
- Mixojapyx dechambrieri Pagés, 1977
- Mixojapyx impar Silvestri, 1948
- Mixojapyx notabilis Silvestri, 1948
- Mixojapyx reddelli Muegge, 1992
- Mixojapyx riggii Silvestri, 1948
- Mixojapyx saussurei (Humbert, 1868)
- Mixojapyx tridenticulatus (Fox, 1941)
