= Metajapyx =

Scientific classification
- Domain: Eukaryota
- Kingdom: Animalia
- Phylum: Arthropoda
- Order: Diplura
- Family: Japygidae
- Genus: Metajapyx; Silvestri, 1932

Genus of two-pronged bristletails

Metajapyx is a genus of forcepstails in the family Japygidae. There are more than 30 described species in Metajapyx.

== Species ==
These 37 species belong to the genus Metajapyx:

- Metajapyx aemulans (Silvestri, 1932)
- Metajapyx athenarum Cook, 1899
- Metajapyx besucheti Pages, 1978
- Metajapyx bonadonai Pagés, 1954
- Metajapyx braueri (Verhoeff, 1904)
- Metajapyx codinai (Silvestri, 1929)
- Metajapyx confectus Silvestri, 1947
- Metajapyx creticus (Cook, 1899)
- Metajapyx doderoi (Silvestri, 1934)
- Metajapyx dolinensis (Verhoeff, 1904)
- Metajapyx firmus (Silvestri, 1931)
- Metajapyx folsomi Silvestri, 1948
- Metajapyx gallicus (Silvestri, 1934)
- Metajapyx garganicus Silvestri, 1948
- Metajapyx gojkovici Pages, 1953
- Metajapyx heterocereus Muegge & Bernard, 1990
- Metajapyx illinoiensis Smith & Bolton, 1964
- Metajapyx inductus (Silvestri, 1932)
- Metajapyx insularis (Silvestri, 1907)
- Metajapyx latens (Silvestri, 1932)
- Metajapyx leruthi Silvestri, 1948
- Metajapyx magnifimbriatus Muegge & Bernard, 1990
- Metajapyx moroderi (Silvestri, 1929)
- Metajapyx multidens (Cook, 1899)
- Metajapyx parvidens Silvestri, 1948
- Metajapyx peanoi Pages, 1980
- Metajapyx pervengens (Silvestri, 1932)
- Metajapyx phitosi Pages, 1983
- Metajapyx propinquus (Silvestri, 1948)
- Metajapyx remingtoni Smith & Bolton, 1964
- Metajapyx repentinus Pages, 1953
- Metajapyx serratus (Stach, 1929)
- Metajapyx siculus (Verhoeff, 1923)
- Metajapyx steevesi Smith & Bolton, 1964
- Metajapyx strouhalae Paclt, 1957
- Metajapyx subterraneus (Packard, 1874)
- Metajapyx viti Pages, 1993
