= Congjapyx =

Scientific classification
- Kingdom: Animalia
- Phylum: Arthropoda
- Class: Entognatha
- Order: Diplura
- Family: Japygidae
- Genus: Congjapyx; Pagés, 1954

Genus of two-pronged bristletails

Congjapyx is a genus of diplurans in the family Japygidae.

== Species ==
- Congjapyx constrictus Pagés & Schowing, 1958
- Congjapyx hirtus Pagés & Schowing, 1958
- Congjapyx insidiator Pagés & Schowing, 1958
- Congjapyx insolans Pagés & Schowing, 1958
- Congjapyx intermedius Pagés & Schowing, 1958
- Congjapyx kabarensis Pagés & Schowing, 1958
- Congjapyx longipilus Pagés & Schowing, 1958
- Congjapyx schoutedini Pagés, 1954
