= Dalaca vibicata =

Scientific classification
- Domain: Eukaryota
- Kingdom: Animalia
- Phylum: Arthropoda
- Class: Insecta
- Order: Lepidoptera
- Family: Hepialidae
- Genus: Dalaca
- Species: D. vibicata

Binomial name
- Dalaca vibicata Pfitzner, 1914

Species of moth

Dalaca vibicata is a species of moth of the family Hepialidae. It is known from Ecuador.
