= Psalidojapyx =

Scientific classification
- Domain: Eukaryota
- Kingdom: Animalia
- Phylum: Arthropoda
- Order: Diplura
- Family: Japygidae
- Genus: Psalidojapyx; Pagés, 2000

Genus of two-pronged bristletails

Psalidojapyx is a genus of diplurans in the family Japygidae.

== Species ==
- Psalidojapyx edentulus Pagés, 2000
- Psalidojapyx murudensis (Silvestri, 1930)
