= Epijapyx =

Scientific classification
- Kingdom: Animalia
- Phylum: Arthropoda
- Class: Entognatha
- Order: Diplura
- Family: Japygidae
- Genus: Epijapyx; Silvestri, 1933

Genus of two-pronged bristletails

Epijapyx is a genus of diplurans in the family Japygidae.

== Species ==
- Epijapyx corcyraeus (Verhoeff, 1904)
