= Occasjapyx =

Scientific classification
- Domain: Eukaryota
- Kingdom: Animalia
- Phylum: Arthropoda
- Order: Diplura
- Family: Japygidae
- Genus: Occasjapyx; Silvestri, 1948

Genus of two-pronged bristletails

Occasjapyx is a genus of diplurans in the family Japygidae.

== Species ==
- Occasjapyx americanus (MacGillivray, 1893)
- Occasjapyx californicus Silvestri, 1948
- Occasjapyx carltoni Allen, 1988
- Occasjapyx kofoidi (Silvestri, 1928)
- Occasjapyx sierrensis Smith, 1959
- Occasjapyx wulingensis Xie & Yang, 1991
- Occasjapyx yangi Chou & Chen, 1983
