= Kohjapyx =

Scientific classification
- Kingdom: Animalia
- Phylum: Arthropoda
- Class: Entognatha
- Order: Diplura
- Family: Japygidae
- Genus: Kohjapyx; Pagés, 1953

Genus of two-pronged bristletails

Kohjapyx is a genus of diplurans in the family Japygidae.

== Species ==
- Kohjapyx lindbergi Pagés, 1962
- Kohjapyx serfatyi Pagés, 1953
- Kohjapyx uchleri (Pagés, 1962)
