= Japyginus =

Scientific classification
- Kingdom: Animalia
- Phylum: Arthropoda
- Class: Entognatha
- Order: Diplura
- Family: Japygidae
- Genus: Japyginus; Silvestri, 1930

Genus of two-pronged bristletails

Japyginus is a genus of diplurans in the family Japygidae.

== Species ==
- Japyginus breviforceps Silvestri, 1930
