= Dalaca crocatus =

Scientific classification
- Kingdom: Animalia
- Phylum: Arthropoda
- Class: Insecta
- Order: Lepidoptera
- Family: Hepialidae
- Genus: Dalaca
- Species: D. crocatus

Binomial name
- Dalaca crocatus (Ureta, 1956)

Synonyms
- Hepialus crocatus Ureta, 1956

Species of moth

Dalaca crocatus is a species of moth of the family Hepialidae. It is known from Chile.
