= Parindjapyx =

Scientific classification
- Domain: Eukaryota
- Kingdom: Animalia
- Phylum: Arthropoda
- Order: Diplura
- Family: Japygidae
- Genus: Parindjapyx; Silvestri, 1933

Genus of two-pronged bristletails

Parindjapyx is a genus of diplurans in the family Japygidae. It contains 11 named species.

== Species ==
- Parindjapyx aelleni Pagés, 1977
- Parindjapyx apulus (Silvestri, 1908)
- Parindjapyx chiorandoi Silvestri, 1933
- Parindjapyx crivellarii Silvestri, 1933
- Parindjapyx dessyi Silvestri, 1933
- Parindjapyx furcatus Pagés, 1984
- Parindjapyx guttulatus Pagés, 1984
- Parindjapyx insignis Pagés, 1984
- Parindjapyx vulturnus Pagés, 1984
- Parindjapyx wollastonii (Westwood, 1874)
- Parindjapyx xerophilus Pagés, 1984
