= Abjapyx =

Scientific classification
- Kingdom: Animalia
- Phylum: Arthropoda
- Class: Entognatha
- Order: Diplura
- Family: Japygidae
- Genus: Abjapyx; Silvestri, 1948

Genus of two-pronged bristletails

Abjapyx is a genus of diplurans in the family Japygidae.

== Species ==
- Abjapyx lepesmei (Silvestri, 1948)
