= Notojapyx tillyardi =

Scientific classification
- Domain: Eukaryota
- Kingdom: Animalia
- Phylum: Arthropoda
- Order: Diplura
- Family: Japygidae
- Genus: Notojapyx
- Species: N. tillyardi

Binomial name
- Notojapyx tillyardi (Silvestri, 1930)

Species of two-pronged bristletail

Notojapyx tillyardi is a species of forcepstail in the family Japygidae. It is found in New Zealand.
