= Hainanjapyx =

Scientific classification
- Kingdom: Animalia
- Phylum: Arthropoda
- Class: Entognatha
- Order: Diplura
- Family: Japygidae
- Genus: Hainanjapyx; Chou, in Chou & Chen 1983

Genus of two-pronged bristletails

Hainanjapyx is a genus of diplurans in the family Japygidae.

== Species ==
- Hainanjapyx jianfengensis Chou, in Chou & Chen 1983
- Hainanjapyx xinlongensis Chou, in Chou & Chen 1983
