= Dalaca cocama =

Scientific classification
- Domain: Eukaryota
- Kingdom: Animalia
- Phylum: Arthropoda
- Class: Insecta
- Order: Lepidoptera
- Family: Hepialidae
- Genus: Dalaca
- Species: D. cocama

Binomial name
- Dalaca cocama Pfitzner, 1914

Synonyms
- Triodia cocama Pfitzner, 1914; Dalaca (Triodia) nannophyes Pfitzner, 1914

Species of moth

Dalaca cocama is a species of moth of the family Hepialidae. It is known from Peru and Ecuador.
