= Oncojapyx =

Scientific classification
- Kingdom: Animalia
- Phylum: Arthropoda
- Class: Entognatha
- Order: Diplura
- Family: Japygidae
- Genus: Oncojapyx; Silvestri, 1948

Genus of two-pronged bristletails

Oncojapyx is a genus of diplurans in the family Japygidae.

== Species ==
- Oncojapyx basilewskyi Pagés, 1952
- Oncojapyx machadoi Silvestri, 1948
- Oncojapyx peramatus Pagés, 1952
