= Dalaca chiliensis =

Scientific classification
- Kingdom: Animalia
- Phylum: Arthropoda
- Class: Insecta
- Order: Lepidoptera
- Family: Hepialidae
- Genus: Dalaca
- Species: D. chiliensis

Binomial name
- Dalaca chiliensis (Viette, 1950)

Synonyms
- Maculella chilensis Viette, 1950; Dalaca chilensis Viette, 1950

Species of moth

Dalaca chiliensis is a species of moth of the family Hepialidae. It is known from Chile, from which its species epithet is derived.
