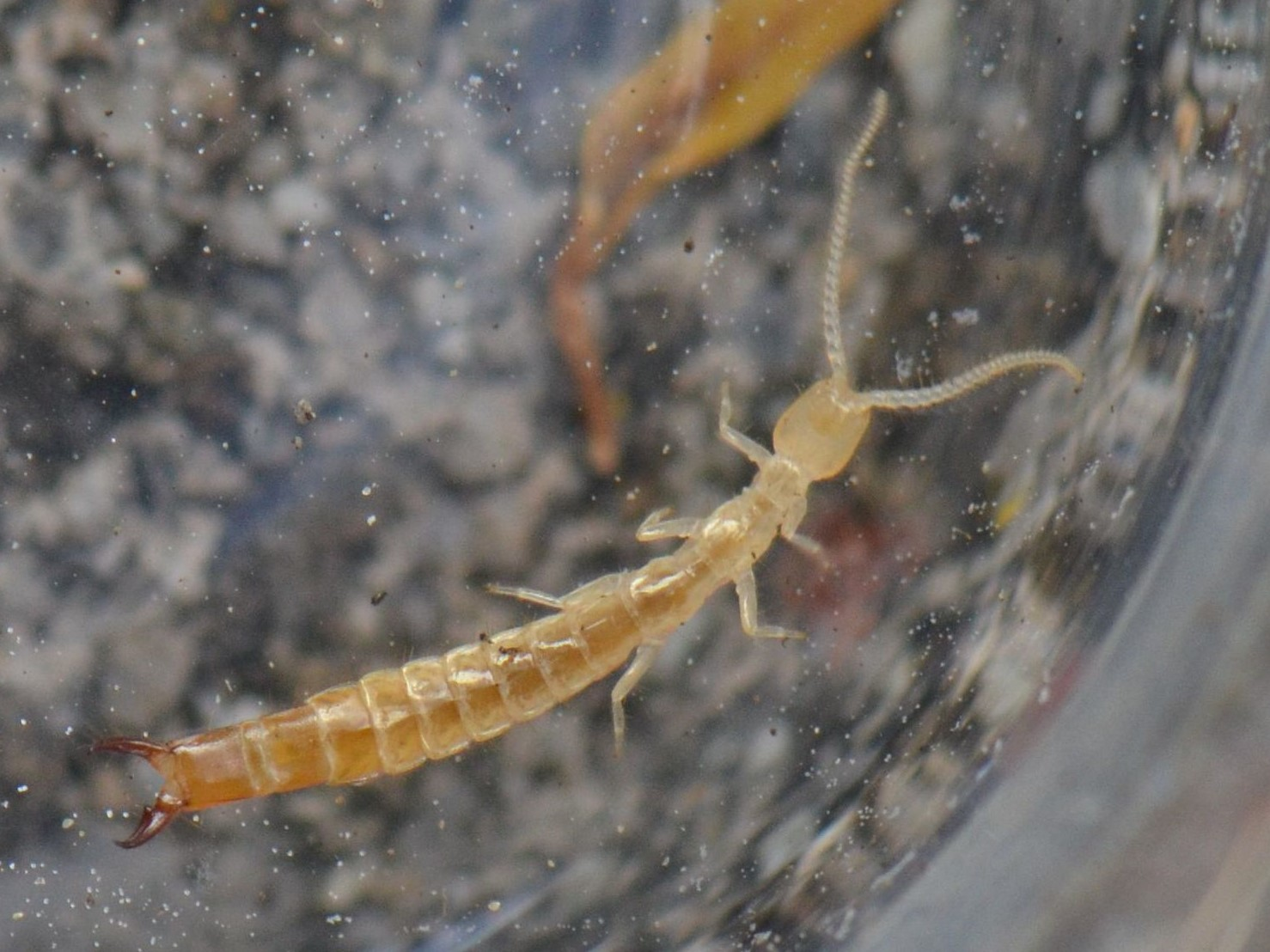
- Dipljapyx humberti

Scientific classification
- Kingdom: Animalia
- Phylum: Arthropoda
- Clade: Pancrustacea
- Class: Entognatha
- Order: Diplura
- Family: Japygidae
- Subfamily: Japyginae
- Genus: Dipljapyx; Silvestri, 1948

= Dipljapyx =

Genus of two-pronged bristletails

Dipljapyx is a genus of diplurans in the family Japygidae.

== Species ==
- Dipljapyx beroni Pagés, 1974
- Dipljapyx fagniezi Pagés, 1952
- Dipljapyx hirpinus SIlvestri, 1948
- Dipljapyx humberti (Grassi, 1886)
- Dipljapyx italicus (Silvestri, 1908)
- Dipljapyx limbarae Silvestri, 1948
- Dipljapyx nexus Silvestri, 1948
- Dipljapyx sardous Silvestri, 1948
- Dipljapyx silanus Silvestri, 1948
