= Cnemidochroma buckleyi =

Scientific classification
- Domain: Eukaryota
- Kingdom: Animalia
- Phylum: Arthropoda
- Class: Insecta
- Order: Coleoptera
- Suborder: Polyphaga
- Infraorder: Cucujiformia
- Family: Cerambycidae
- Genus: Cnemidochroma
- Species: C. buckleyi

Binomial name
- Cnemidochroma buckleyi (Bates, 1879)

Species of beetle

Cnemidochroma buckleyi is a species of beetle in the family Cerambycidae. It was described by Bates in 1879. It is known from Ecuador, Peru, and Bolivia.
