= Dalaca nigricornis =

Scientific classification
- Kingdom: Animalia
- Phylum: Arthropoda
- Class: Insecta
- Order: Lepidoptera
- Family: Hepialidae
- Genus: Dalaca
- Species: D. nigricornis

Binomial name
- Dalaca nigricornis Walker, 1865

Species of moth

Dalaca nigricornis is a species of moth of the family Hepialidae. It is known from Chile.
