= Nanojapyx =

Scientific classification
- Domain: Eukaryota
- Kingdom: Animalia
- Phylum: Arthropoda
- Order: Diplura
- Family: Japygidae
- Genus: Nanojapyx; Smith, 1959

Genus of two-pronged bristletails

Nanojapyx is a genus of diplurans in the family Japygidae.

== Species ==
- Nanojapyx coalingae Smith, 1959
- Nanojapyx gentilei Smith, 1959
- Nanojapyx hamoni Smith, 1959
- Nanojapyx pagesi Smith, 1959
- Nanojapyx pricei Smith, 1959
