= Dalaca chiriquensis =

Scientific classification
- Kingdom: Animalia
- Phylum: Arthropoda
- Class: Insecta
- Order: Lepidoptera
- Family: Hepialidae
- Genus: Dalaca
- Species: D. chiriquensis

Binomial name
- Dalaca chiriquensis Pfitzner, 1914

Species of moth

Dalaca chiriquensis is a species of moth of the family Hepialidae. It is known from Panama.
