= Merojapyx =

Scientific classification
- Kingdom: Animalia
- Phylum: Arthropoda
- Class: Entognatha
- Order: Diplura
- Family: Japygidae
- Genus: Merojapyx; Silvestri, 1948

Genus of two-pronged bristletails

Merojapyx is a genus of diplurans in the family Japygidae.

== Species ==
- Merojapyx porteri Silvestri, 1948
- Merojapyx riverosi Silvestri, 1948
- Merojapyx spegazzinii Silvestri, 1948
