= Sinjapyx =

Scientific classification
- Kingdom: Animalia
- Phylum: Arthropoda
- Class: Entognatha
- Order: Diplura
- Family: Japygidae
- Genus: Sinjapyx; Silvestri, 1948

Genus of two-pronged bristletails

Sinjapyx is a genus of diplurans in the family Japygidae.

== Species ==
- Sinjapyx cupellii (Silvestri, 1928)
- Sinjapyx davidoffi Silvestri, 1948
- Sinjapyx denisi Silvestri, 1948
- Sinjapyx modicus Silvestri, 1948
