= Cnemidochroma =

Scientific classification
- Domain: Eukaryota
- Kingdom: Animalia
- Phylum: Arthropoda
- Class: Insecta
- Order: Coleoptera
- Suborder: Polyphaga
- Infraorder: Cucujiformia
- Family: Cerambycidae
- Tribe: Callichromatini
- Genus: Cnemidochroma

Genus of beetle

Cnemidochroma is a genus of beetles in the family Cerambycidae, containing the following species:

- Cnemidochroma buckleyi (Bates, 1879)
- Cnemidochroma coeruleum (Achard, 1910)
- Cnemidochroma lopesi Fragoso & Monné, 1989
- Cnemidochroma ohausi (Schmidt, 1924)
- Cnemidochroma phyllopoides (Schmidt, 1924)
- Cnemidochroma phyllopus (Guérin-Méneville, 1844)
