= Gigasjapyx =

Scientific classification
- Kingdom: Animalia
- Phylum: Arthropoda
- Class: Entognatha
- Order: Diplura
- Family: Japygidae
- Genus: Gigasjapyx; Chou, 1984

Genus of two-pronged bristletails

Gigasjapyx is a genus of diplurans in the family Japygidae.

== Species ==
- Gigasjapyx termitophilous Chou, 1984
