= Hecajapyx =

Scientific classification
- Domain: Eukaryota
- Kingdom: Animalia
- Phylum: Arthropoda
- Order: Diplura
- Family: Japygidae
- Genus: Hecajapyx; Smith, 1959

Genus of two-pronged bristletails

Hecajapyx is a genus of diplurans in the family Japygidae.

== Species ==
- Hecajapyx bucketti Smith, 1964
- Hecajapyx vulgaris Smith, 1959
