= Choujapyx =

Scientific classification
- Kingdom: Animalia
- Phylum: Arthropoda
- Class: Entognatha
- Order: Diplura
- Family: Japygidae
- Genus: Choujapyx; Huang, 2001

Genus of two-pronged bristletails

Choujapyx is a genus of diplurans in the family Japygidae.

== Species ==
- Choujapyx choui Huang, 2001
