= Silvestriapyx =

Scientific classification
- Kingdom: Animalia
- Phylum: Arthropoda
- Clade: Pancrustacea
- Order: Diplura
- Superfamily: Japygoidea
- Family: Japygidae
- Genus: Silvestriapyx; Pagés, 1981

Type species
- Silvestriapyx greeni (Silvestri, 1930)

Genus of two-pronged bristletails

Silvestriapyx is a monotypic genus of diplurans in the family Japygidae and subfamily Japyginae. Its sole species, Silvestriapyx greeni, is endemic to Sri Lanka.

== Taxonomy ==
The type species was originally described as Japyx greeni in 1930 by the Italian entomologist Filippo Silvestri, from specimens collected in Ceylon (now Sri Lanka). In 1981, the French entomologist Jean Pagés established Silvestriapyx for this species, naming the genus in honour of Silvestri.

== Diagnosis ==
In his original description of S. greeni, Silvestri distinguished the species by the shape of the posterior angles on the sixth and seventh abdominal tergites, the structure of the subcoxal organs on the first urosternite, and the setation of the antennal segments.

== Species ==
- Silvestriapyx greeni (Silvestri, 1930)
