= Troglojapyx =

Scientific classification
- Kingdom: Animalia
- Phylum: Arthropoda
- Class: Entognatha
- Order: Diplura
- Family: Japygidae
- Genus: Troglojapyx; Pagés, 1980

Genus of two-pronged bristletails

Troglojapyx is a genus of diplurans in the family Japygidae.

== Species ==
- Troglojapyx hauseri Pagés, 1980
