= Urojapyx =

Scientific classification
- Kingdom: Animalia
- Phylum: Arthropoda
- Class: Entognatha
- Order: Diplura
- Family: Japygidae
- Genus: Urojapyx; Pagés, 1955

Genus of two-pronged bristletails

Urojapyx is a genus of diplurans in the family Japygidae.

== Species ==
- Urojapyx whytei Pagés, 1955
