= Isojapyx =

Scientific classification
- Kingdom: Animalia
- Phylum: Arthropoda
- Class: Entognatha
- Order: Diplura
- Family: Japygidae
- Genus: Isojapyx; Silvestri, 1948

Genus of two-pronged bristletails

Isojapyx is a genus of diplurans in the family Japygidae.

== Species ==
- Isojapyx eidemani Silvestri, 1948
- Isojapyx excitus (Silvestri, 1930)
- Isojapyx scopiferus Silvestri, 1948
