= Cnemidochroma ohausi =

Scientific classification
- Kingdom: Animalia
- Phylum: Arthropoda
- Class: Insecta
- Order: Coleoptera
- Suborder: Polyphaga
- Infraorder: Cucujiformia
- Family: Cerambycidae
- Genus: Cnemidochroma
- Species: C. ohausi

Binomial name
- Cnemidochroma ohausi (Schmidt, 1924)

Species of beetle

Cnemidochroma ohausi is a species of beetle in the family Cerambycidae. It was described by Schmidt in 1924. It is known from southeastern Brazil.
