= Allurjapyx =

Scientific classification
- Kingdom: Animalia
- Phylum: Arthropoda
- Class: Entognatha
- Order: Diplura
- Family: Japygidae
- Genus: Allurjapyx; Silvestri, 1930

Genus of two-pronged bristletails

Allurjapyx is a genus of diplurans in the family Japygidae.

== Species ==
- Allurjapyx aethiopicus Silvestri, 1930
- Allurjapyx leleupi (Pagés, 1952)
