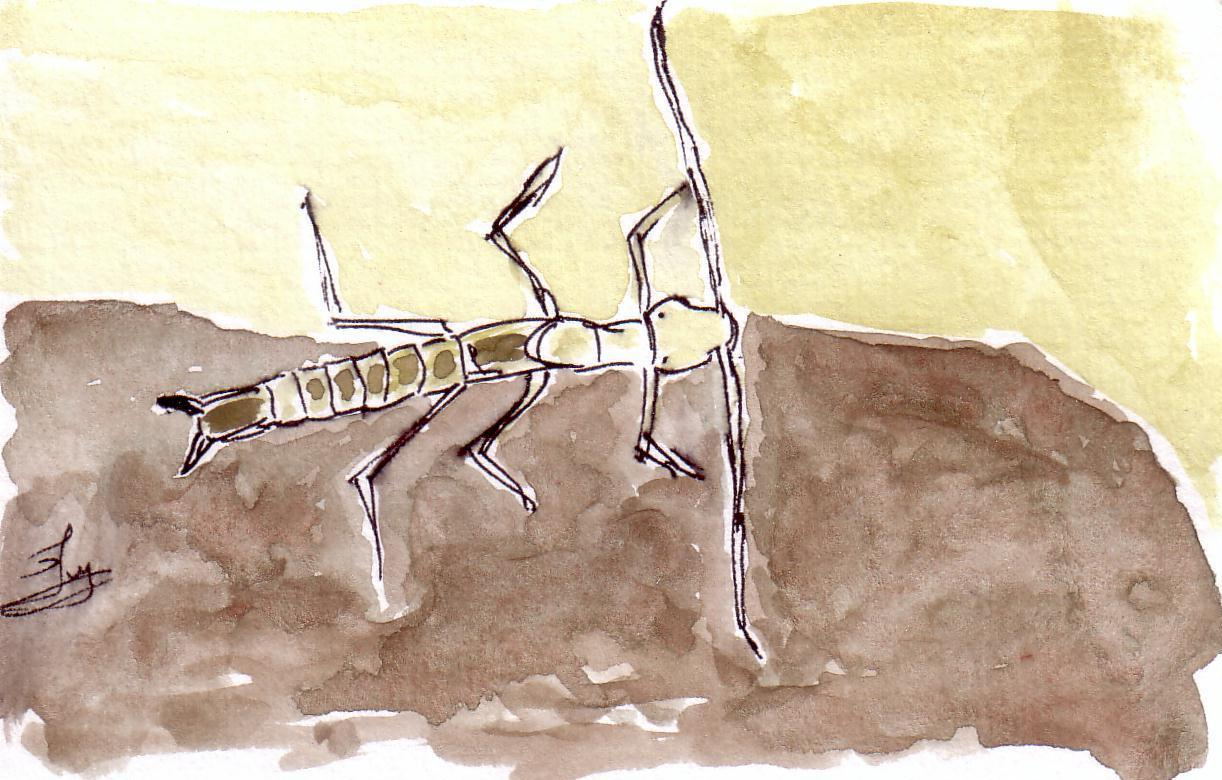

Scientific classification
- Kingdom: Animalia
- Phylum: Arthropoda
- Class: Entognatha
- Order: Diplura
- Family: Japygidae
- Genus: Gollumjapyx; Sendra & Ortuño, 2006
- Species: G. smeagol

Binomial name
- Gollumjapyx smeagol Sendra & Ortuño, 2006
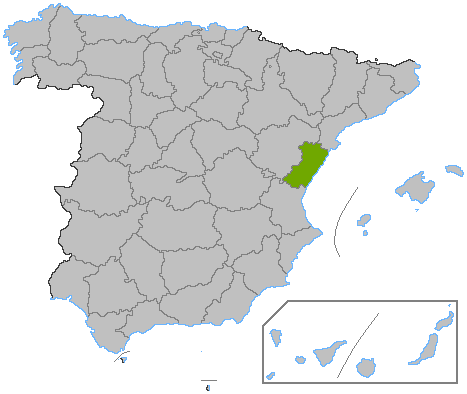
- Castellón province

= Gollumjapyx =

Genus of two-pronged bristletails

Gollumjapyx smeagol is a species of dipluran, named after Gollum, a fictional character from J. R. R. Tolkien's legendarium. It is the only species in the genus Gollumjapyx. It was first discovered in caves in the Spanish province of Castellón.
