= Pauperojapyx =

Scientific classification
- Kingdom: Animalia
- Phylum: Arthropoda
- Class: Entognatha
- Order: Diplura
- Family: Japygidae
- Genus: Pauperojapyx; Pagés, 1995

Genus of two-pronged bristletails

Pauperojapyx is a genus of diplurans in the family Japygidae.

== Species ==
- Pauperojapyx iban Pagés, 1995
