= Burmjapyx =

Scientific classification
- Kingdom: Animalia
- Phylum: Arthropoda
- Class: Entognatha
- Order: Diplura
- Family: Japygidae
- Genus: Burmjapyx; Silvestri, 1931

Synonyms
- Burmajapyx

Genus of two-pronged bristletails

Burmjapyx is a genus of diplurans in the family Japygidae.

== Species ==
- Burmjapyx goliath (Parona, 1888)
- Burmjapyx lienhardi Pagés, 2000
- Burmjapyx longiseta (Silvestri, 1908)
- Burmjapyx megurus Silvestri, 1948
- Burmjapyx molineti (Silvestri, 1929)
- Burmjapyx murphyi Pagés, 2000
- Burmjapyx oudemansi (Parona, 1892)
- Burmjapyx paronae Silvestri, 1931
