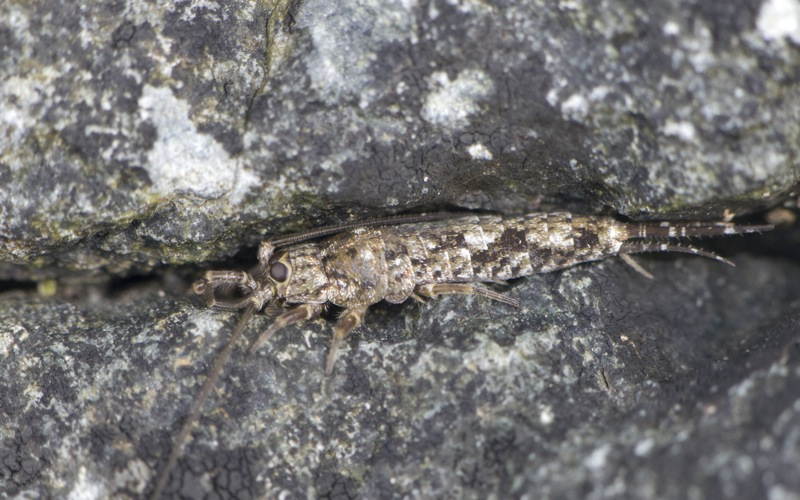
- Petridiobius arcticus

Scientific classification
- Kingdom: Animalia
- Phylum: Arthropoda
- Clade: Pancrustacea
- Class: Insecta
- Order: Archaeognatha
- Family: Machilidae
- Subfamily: Petrobiinae
- Genus: Petridiobius; Paclt, 1970

= Petridiobius =

Genus of jumping bristletails

Petridiobius is a genus of jumping bristletails in the family Machilidae. There are at least two described species in Petridiobius.

== Species ==
- Petridiobius arcticus (Folsom, 1902)
- Petridiobius canadensis Sturm, 2001
