= Evalljapyx =

Scientific classification
- Kingdom: Animalia
- Phylum: Arthropoda
- Class: Entognatha
- Order: Diplura
- Family: Japygidae
- Genus: Evalljapyx; Silvestri, 1911

Genus of two-pronged bristletails

Evalljapyx is a genus of diplurans in the family Japygidae.

== Species ==
- Evalljapyx adonis Smith, 1960
- Evalljapyx aguayoi Silvestri, 1929
- Evalljapyx anombris Smith, 1960
- Evalljapyx bolivari Silvestri, 1948
- Evalljapyx boneti Silvestri, 1948
- Evalljapyx brevipalpus Silvestri, 1911
- Evalljapyx bruneri Silvestri, 1929
- Evalljapyx costaricanus Silvestri, 1948
- Evalljapyx crassicauda Silvestri, 1929
- Evalljapyx cubanus Silvestri, 1929
- Evalljapyx decorus Smith, 1960
- Evalljapyx dispar Silvestri, 1948
- Evalljapyx diversipleura Silvestri, 1911
- Evalljapyx dolichodduus Silvestri, 1911
- Evalljapyx euryhebdomus Silvestri, 1911
- Evalljapyx facetus Smith, 1959
- Evalljapyx furciger Silvestri, 1911
- Evalljapyx helferi Smith, 1959
- Evalljapyx heterurus Silvestri, 1911
- Evalljapyx hubbardi (Cook, 1899)
- Evalljapyx leechi Smith, 1960
- Evalljapyx leleuoporum Paclt, 1976
- Evalljapyx limpia Muegge, 2004
- Evalljapyx macswaini Smith, 1960
- Evalljapyx mckenziei Smith, 1960
- Evalljapyx newelli Smith, 1960
- Evalljapyx ombris Smith, 1960
- Evalljapyx propinquus Silvestri, 1911
- Evalljapyx raneyi Smith, 1959
- Evalljapyx saundersi Pagés, 1996
- Evalljapyx sonoranus Silvestri, 1911
- Evalljapyx subinermis Silvestri, 1929
- Evalljapyx vicinior Silvestri, 1948
