= Dalaca variabilis =

Scientific classification
- Kingdom: Animalia
- Phylum: Arthropoda
- Class: Insecta
- Order: Lepidoptera
- Family: Hepialidae
- Genus: Dalaca
- Species: D. variabilis

Binomial name
- Dalaca variabilis (Viette, 1950)

Synonyms
- Maculella variabilis Viette, 1950

Species of moth

Dalaca variabilis is a species of moth of the family Hepialidae. It is known from Chile.
