= Battigrassiella =

Scientific classification
- Domain: Eukaryota
- Kingdom: Animalia
- Phylum: Arthropoda
- Class: Insecta
- Order: Zygentoma
- Family: Nicoletiidae
- Genus: Battigrassiella; Paclt, 1963
- Species: B. wheeleri

Binomial name
- Battigrassiella wheeleri (Escherich, 1905)

Genus of silverfishes

Battigrassiella is a genus of nicoletiids in the family Nicoletiidae, containing one described species, B. wheeleri.
