= Monojapyx =

Scientific classification
- Kingdom: Animalia
- Phylum: Arthropoda
- Class: Entognatha
- Order: Diplura
- Family: Parajapygidae
- Genus: Monojapyx; Paclt, 1957

Genus of two-pronged bristletails

Monojapyx is a genus of diplurans in the family Japygidae.

== Species ==
- Monojapyx simplex (Verhoeff, 1923)
