= Typhlolabia =

Scientific classification
- Kingdom: Animalia
- Phylum: Arthropoda
- Class: Entognatha
- Order: Diplura
- Family: Japygidae
- Genus: Typhlolabia; Scudder, 1876

Genus of two-pronged bristletails

Typhlolabia is a genus of diplurans in the family Japygidae.

== Species ==
- Typhlolabia afer (Silvestri, 1948)
- Typhlolabia bidentata (Schäffer, 1897)
- Typhlolabia costala (González & Smith, 1964)
- Typhlolabia hirsuta (González & Smith, 1964)
- Typhlolabia larva (Philippi, 1863)
- Typhlolabia megalocera (Silvestri, 1902)
- Typhlolabia parca (Silvestri, 1948)
- Typhlolabia profunda (Smith, 1962)
- Typhlolabia riestrae (Silvestri, 1948)
- Typhlolabia talcae (Smith, 1962)
- Typhlolabia vivaldii (Silvestri, 1929)
