= Deutojapyx =

Scientific classification
- Kingdom: Animalia
- Phylum: Arthropoda
- Class: Entognatha
- Order: Diplura
- Family: Japygidae
- Genus: Deutojapyx; Paclt, 1957

Genus of two-pronged bristletails

Deutojapyx is a genus of diplurans in the family Japygidae.

== Species ==
- Deutojapyx greeni (Silvestri, 1931)
- Deutojapyx guizhouensis Chou, in Chou & Chen 1983
