= Acrolophus tapuja =

Scientific classification
- Domain: Eukaryota
- Kingdom: Animalia
- Phylum: Arthropoda
- Class: Insecta
- Order: Lepidoptera
- Family: Tineidae
- Genus: Acrolophus
- Species: A. tapuja

Binomial name
- Acrolophus tapuja (Pfitzner, 1914)

Synonyms
- Dalaca tapuja Pfitzner, 1914

Species of moth

Acrolophus tapuja is a species of moth of the family Acrolophidae. It is found in Colombia and southern Brazil.

== Taxonomy ==
The species was described as a Hepialidae species.
