= Dalaca pallens =

Scientific classification
- Domain: Eukaryota
- Kingdom: Animalia
- Phylum: Arthropoda
- Class: Insecta
- Order: Lepidoptera
- Family: Hepialidae
- Genus: Dalaca
- Species: D. pallens

Binomial name
- Dalaca pallens (Blanchard, 1852)

Synonyms
- Hepialus pallens Blanchard, 1852; Dalaca hemileuca Butler, 1882; Dalaca marmorata Butler, 1882; Dalaca subfervens Butler, 1882; Dalaca violacea Butler, 1882; Aepytus dimidiatus Berg, 1882; Dalaca noctuides Pfitzner, 1914; Huapina parviguttata Bryk, 1945; Lossbergiana pseudodimiata Paclt, 1953; Toenga oceanica Tindale, 1954

Species of moth

Dalaca pallens is a species of moth of the family Hepialidae. It is known from Chile and Argentina.
