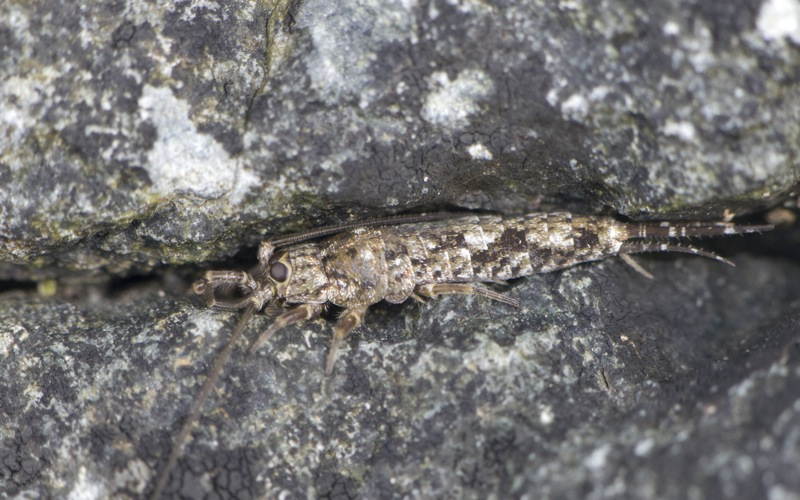

Scientific classification
- Kingdom: Animalia
- Phylum: Arthropoda
- Clade: Pancrustacea
- Class: Insecta
- Order: Archaeognatha
- Family: Machilidae
- Genus: Petridiobius
- Species: P. arcticus

Binomial name
- Petridiobius arcticus (Folsom, 1902)

Synonyms
- Machilis arctica Folsom, 1902

= Petridiobius arcticus =

Species of jumping bristletail

Petridiobius arcticus is a species of jumping bristletail in the family Machilidae. It is found in Europe and Northern Asia (excluding China) and North America.
