= Afrojapyx =

Scientific classification
- Kingdom: Animalia
- Phylum: Arthropoda
- Class: Entognatha
- Order: Diplura
- Family: Japygidae
- Genus: Afrojapyx; Silvestri, 1948

Genus of two-pronged bristletails

Afrojapyx is a genus of diplurans in the family Japygidae.

== Species ==
- Afrojapyx africanus (Karsch, 1893)
- Afrojapyx congoanus Silvestri, 1948
- Afrojapyx mixtus Pagés, 1957
- Afrojapyx stricklandi Silvestri, 1948
