= Ultrajapyx =

Scientific classification
- Kingdom: Animalia
- Phylum: Arthropoda
- Class: Entognatha
- Order: Diplura
- Family: Japygidae
- Genus: Ultrajapyx; Paclt, 1957

Genus of two-pronged bristletails

Ultrajapyx is a genus of diplurans in the family Japygidae.

== Species ==
- Ultrajapyx pieltaini (Silvestri, 1929)
