= Hapljapyx =

Scientific classification
- Kingdom: Animalia
- Phylum: Arthropoda
- Class: Entognatha
- Order: Diplura
- Family: Japygidae
- Genus: Hapljapyx; Silvestri, 1948

Genus of two-pronged bristletails

Hapljapyx is a genus of diplurans in the family Japygidae.

Haplijapyx are typical Diplurans. They are small, white, eyeless, entognathous hexapoda with moniliform antennae (antenna with equally sized spherical segments that looks like a string of beads). They have two abdominal, pincer-like cerci so they are often mistaken for earwigs (Dermaptera) but earwigs have eyes. Hapljapyx are described as the most robust members of the family Japygidae.

== Biology ==
Fertilisation is similar to that of the Collembola where the male deposits a spermatophore on the ground. This is taken up by a female, who then lays her eggs in clumps in rotting vegetation or in crevices in the soil. Some species are known to guard their eggs and young. Young diplurans resemble adults. Moulting continues throughout life and an adult may moult up to 30 times during its lifespan of about a 1 year. Hapljapyx are predatory carnivores and use their cerci to capture prey.

== Species ==
- Hapljapyx bertonii Silvestri, 1948
- Hapljapyx carinii Silvestri, 1948
- Hapljapyx demadridi Silvestri, 1948
- Hapljapyx distinctellus Silvestri, 1948
- Hapljapyx lizeri Silvestri, 1948
- Hapljapyx lopesi Silvestri, 1948
- Hapljapyx meyerii Silvestri, 1948
- Hapljapyx oglobinii Silvestri, 1948
- Hapljapyx patagonicus (Silvestri, 1902)
- Hapljapyx patrizii Silvestri, 1948
- Hapljapyx platensis (Silvestri, 1902)
- Hapljapyx wygodzinskyi Silvestri, 1948
