= Cnemidochroma lopesi =

Scientific classification
- Kingdom: Animalia
- Phylum: Arthropoda
- Class: Insecta
- Order: Coleoptera
- Suborder: Polyphaga
- Infraorder: Cucujiformia
- Family: Cerambycidae
- Genus: Cnemidochroma
- Species: C. lopesi

Binomial name
- Cnemidochroma lopesi Fragoso & Monné, 1989

Species of beetle

Cnemidochroma lopesi is a species of beetle in the family Cerambycidae. It was described by S. A. Fragoso and Miguel A. Monné in 1989. It is known from central Brazil.
