= Notojapyx =

Scientific classification
- Domain: Eukaryota
- Kingdom: Animalia
- Phylum: Arthropoda
- Order: Diplura
- Family: Japygidae
- Genus: Notojapyx; Paclt, 1957

Genus of two-pronged bristletails

Notojapyx is a genus of diplurans in the family Japygidae.

== Species ==
- Notojapyx mjoebergi (SIlvestri, 1929)
- Notojapyx tillyardi (Silvestri, 1930)
