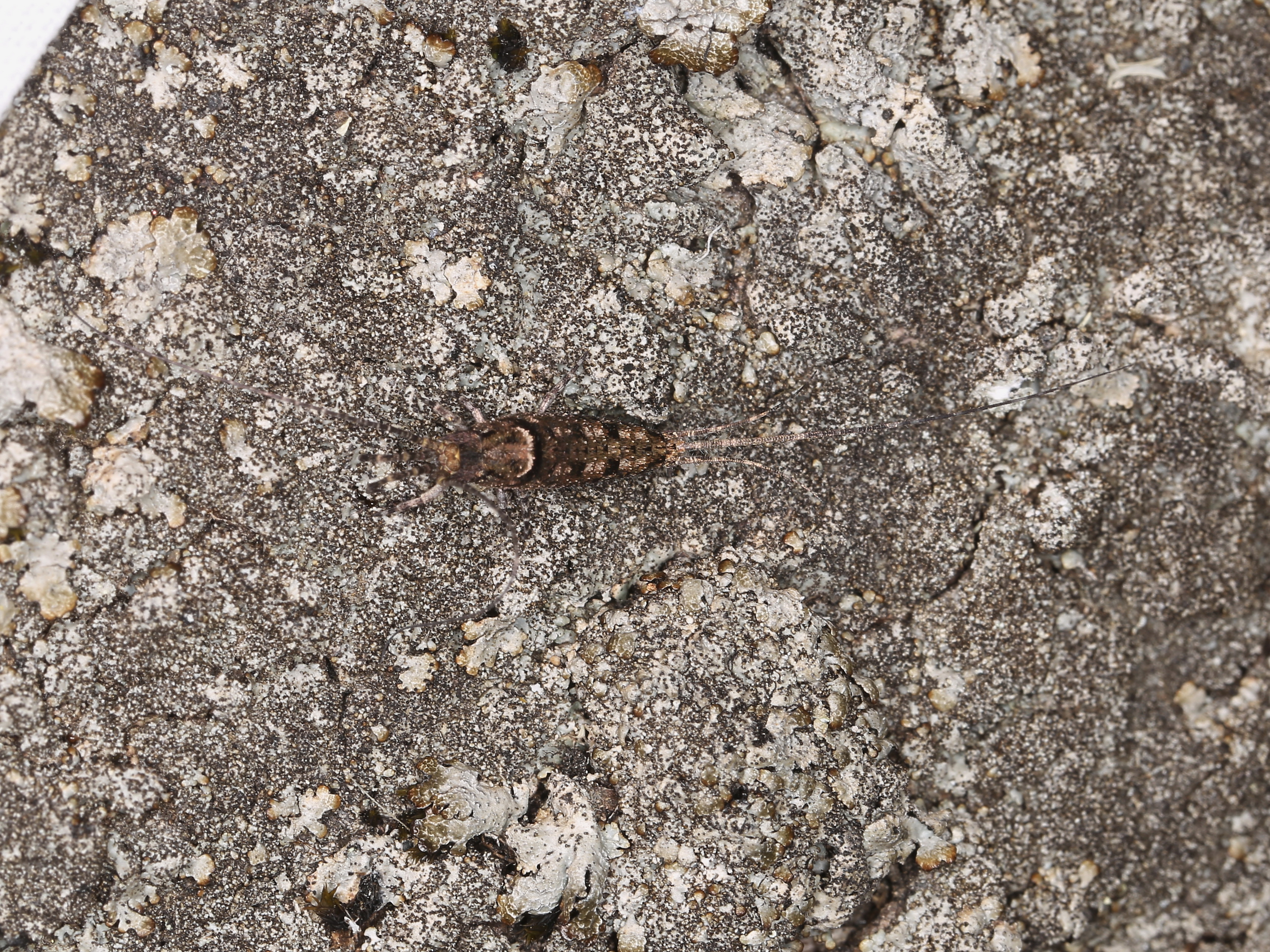
- Mesomachilis sp.

Scientific classification
- Kingdom: Animalia
- Phylum: Arthropoda
- Clade: Pancrustacea
- Class: Insecta
- Order: Archaeognatha
- Family: Machilidae
- Subfamily: Machilinae
- Genus: Mesomachilis; Silvestri, 1911

Synonyms
- Mixomachilis Paclt, 1972

= Mesomachilis =

Genus of jumping bristletails

Mesomachilis is a genus of jumping bristletails in the family Machilidae. There are about six described species in Mesomachilis.

== Species ==
- Mesomachilis californica Sturm, 1991
- Mesomachilis canadensis Sturm, 1991
- Mesomachilis leechi Sturm, 1991
- Mesomachilis mexicana Sturm, 1991
- Mesomachilis nearctica Silvestri, 1911
- Mesomachilis strenua (Silvestri, 1911)
