= Japyx =

Scientific classification
- Domain: Eukaryota
- Kingdom: Animalia
- Phylum: Arthropoda
- Order: Diplura
- Family: Japygidae
- Subfamily: Japyginae
- Genus: Japyx; Haliday, 1864

Species
- See text

Synonyms
- Iapyx Haliday, 1864 (Missp.); Dicellura Haliday, 1864

Genus of two-pronged bristletails

Japyx is a genus of diplurans belonging to the family Japygidae. These eyeless, predatory hexapods largely shun direct sunlight, remaining under stones and among detritus, where they use pincer-like cerci to catch their tiny prey.

== Species ==
- Japyx akiyamae (Silvestri, 1928)
- Japyx albanica (Stach, 1922)
- Japyx angulosus (Silvestri, 1918)
- Japyx arnoldii (Ionescu, 1959)
- Japyx barnardi (Silvestri, 1935)
- Japyx beccarii (Silvestri, 1931)
- Japyx beneserratus (Kuwayama, 1928)
- Japyx biangulatus (Silvestri, 1931)
- Japyx bidens (Cook, 1899)
- Japyx biproductus (Silvestri, 1908)
- Japyx bolivari (Silvestri, 1929)
- Japyx brachycerus (Silvestri, 1930)
- Japyx cavicola (Joseph, 1882)
- Japyx constantinii (Silvestri, 1928)
- Japyx contiguus (Silvestri, 1930)
- Japyx devius (Silvestri, 1930)
- Japyx dolinensis (Verhoeff, 1904)
- Japyx doriae (Silvestri, 1930)
- Japyx dux (Skorikow, 1900)
- Japyx erythraeus (Silvestri, 1930)
- Japyx evansi (Silvestri, 1931)
- Japyx faucium (Vehoeff, 1923)
- Japyx feae (Silvestri, 1930)
- Japyx forficularius (Joseph, 1882)
- Japyx froggartti (Silvestri, 1930)
- Japyx fulleri (Silvestri, 1935)
- Japyx gestri (Silvestri, 1930)
- Japyx ghilarovi (Ionescu, 1959)
- Japyx giffardi (Silvestri, 1930)
- Japyx gilli (Silvestri, 1935)
- Japyx girodii (Silvestri, 1928)
- Japyx glauerti (Womersley, 1934)
- Japyx graecus (Verhoeff, 1904)
- Japyx grassii (Verhoeff, 1904)
- Japyx guineensis (Silvestri, 1930)
- Japyx heymonsi (Silvestri, 1931)
- Japyx hutchinsoni (Silvestri, 1935)
- Japyx inferus Carpenter, 1932
- Japyx insuetus (Pagés, 1983)
- Japyx intercalatus (Silvestri, 1933)
- Japyx ishii (Silvestri, 1928)
- Japyx izmir (Paclt, 1957)
- Japyx japonicus (Enderlein, 1907)
- Japyx javanicus (Cook, 1899)
- Japyx jonicus (Silvestri, 1908)
- Japyx kenyanus (Silvestri, 1918)
- Japyx kosswigi Paclt, 1965
- Japyx kuwanae (Silvestri, 1928)
- Japyx leae (Silvestri, 1930)
- Japyx liberiensis (Cook, 1899)
- Japyx mallyi (Silvestri, 1935)
- Japyx meridionalis (Silvestri, 1948)
- Japyx michaelseni (Silvestri, 1930)
- Japyx minutus (Silvestri, 1948)
- Japyx mjoebergi (Silvestri, 1929)
- Japyx nichollsi (Womersley, 1934)
- Japyx nigerianus (Silvestri, 1929)
- Japyx obliquus (Cook, 1899)
- Japyx onkaparinga (Womersley, 1935)
- Japyx papuasicus (Silvestri, 1902)
- Japyx peringueyi (Silvestri, 1935)
- Japyx persequens (Silvestri, 1918)
- Japyx poletii (Silvestri, 1928)
- Japyx proditus (Silvestri, 1918)
- Japyx purcelli (Peringuey, 1902)
- Japyx remyi (Condé & Pagés, 1950)
- Japyx roeweri (Silvestri, 1931)
- Japyx sarbadhikarii (Fernando, 1960)
- Japyx senegalensis (Silvestri, 1930)
- Japyx serratus (Stach, 1929)
- Japyx sharonii (Verhoeff, 1923)
- Japyx sinuosus (Tuxen, 1930)
- Japyx solifugus Haliday, 1864
- Japyx soulei (Bouvier, 1905)
- Japyx sowerbyi (Silvestri, 1928)
- Japyx subductus (Silvestri, 1930)
- Japyx subuncifer (Silvestri, 1930)
- Japyx syriacus (Silvestri, 1911)
- Japyx temperatus (Silvestri, 1930)
- Japyx texanus Hansen, 1930
- Japyx toccii (Silvestri, 1928)
- Japyx tragardhi (Silvestri, 1935)
- Japyx tunisinus (Silvestri, 1902)
- Japyx turcicus Paclt, 1965
- Japyx turneri Ewing, 1941
- Japyx validior (Silvestri, 1931)
- Japyx werneri (Stach, 1929)
- Japyx westraliensis (Womersley, 1934)
- Japyx womersleyi (Pagés, 1952)
