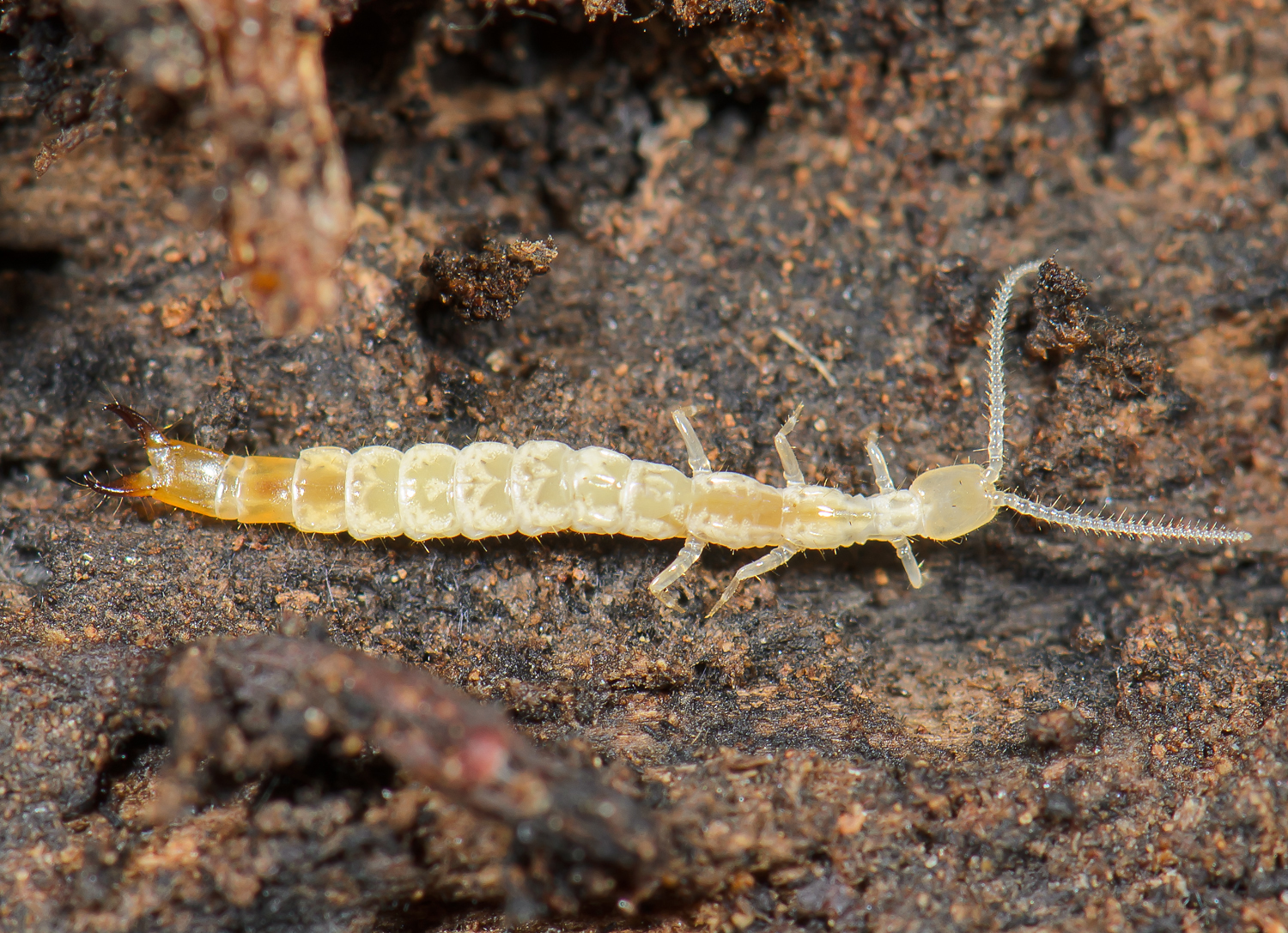

Scientific classification
- Kingdom: Animalia
- Phylum: Arthropoda
- Clade: Pancrustacea
- Class: Entognatha
- Order: Diplura
- Superfamily: Japygoidea
- Family: Japygidae; Haliday, 1864

Subfamilies
- Evalljapyginae Silvestri, 1948; Gigasjapyginae Chou, 1984; Heterojapyginae Womersley, 1939; Japyginae Haliday, 1864; Indjapyginae Womersley, 1939; Japygellinae Somersley, 1939; Provalljapyginae Smith, 1959

Synonyms
- Iapygidae

= Japygidae =

Order of two-pronged bristletails

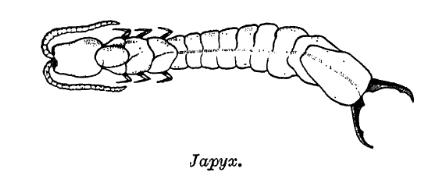

The japygids (family Japygidae) are a taxon of hexapods, of the order Diplura, commonly known as forcepstails.

In this family, the paired cerci at the end of their abdomens are pincer-like (superficially similar to the unrelated earwigs) and are used to catch their tiny prey. Seventy genera are recognised, divided among seven subfamilies.

== Extant genera ==
- Abjapyx Silvestri, 1948
- Afrojapyx Silvestri, 1948
- Allojapyx Silvestri, 1948
- Allurjapyx Silvestri, 1930
- Atlasjapyx Chou & Huang, 1986
- Austrjapyx Silvestri, 1948
- Burmjapyx Silvestri, 1931
- Catajapyx Silvestri, 1933
- Centrjapyx Silvestri, 1948
- Chiljapyx Smith, 1962
- Choujapyx Huang, 2001
- Congjapyx Pagés, 1954
- Ctenjapyx Silvestri, 1948
- Deutojapyx Paclt, 1957
- Dipljapyx Silvestri, 1948
- Ectasjapyx Silvestri, 1929
- Eojapyx Smith, 1960
- Epijapyx Silvestri, 1933
- Evalljapyx Silvestri, 1911
- Gallojapyx Pagés, 1993
- Gigasjapyx Chou, 1984
- Gollumjapyx Sendra & Ortuño, 2006
- Hainanjapyx Chou in Chou & Chen, 1983
- Hapljapyx Silvestri, 1948
- Hecajapyx Smith, 1959
- Henicjapyx Silvestri, 1948
- Heterojapyx Verhoeff, 1904
- Holjapyx Silvestri, 1948
- Hutanjapyx Pagés, 1995
- Indjapyx Silvestri, 1931
- Isojapyx Silvestri, 1948
- Japygellus Silvestri, 1930
- Japygianus Silvestri, 1947
- Japyginus Silvestri, 1930
- Japyx Haliday, 1864
- Kinabalujapyx Pagés, 1994
- Kohjapyx Pagés, 1953
- Megajapyx Verhoeff, 1904
- Merojapyx Silvestri, 1948
- Mesjapyx Silvestri, 1948
- Metajapyx Silvestri, 1933
- Mixojapyx Silvestri, 1933
- Monojapyx Paclt, 1957
- Nanojapyx Smith, 1959
- Nelsjapyx Smith, 1962
- Neojapyx Silvestri, 1933
- Notojapyx Paclt, 1957
- Occasjapyx Silvestri, 1948
- Oncojapyx Silvestri, 1948
- Opisthjapyx Silvestri, 1929
- Parindjapyx Silvestri, 1933
- Pauperojapyx Pagés, 1995
- Penjapyx Smith, 1962
- Polyjapyx Silvestri, 1948
- Proncojapyx Silvestri, 1948
- Protjapyx Silvestri, 1948
- Provalljapyx Silvestri, 1948
- Psalidojapyx Pagés, 2000
- Rectojapyx Pagés, 1954
- Rossjapyx Smith, 1962
- Scottojapyx Pagés, 1957
- Shaanxijapyx Chou in Chou & Chen, 1983
- Silvestriapyx Pagés, 1981
- Sinjapyx Silvestri, 1948
- Troglojapyx Pagés, 1980
- Typhlolabia Scudder, 1876
- Ultrajapyx Paclt, 1957
- Unjapyx Silvestri, 1948
- Urojapyx Pagés, 1955
- Xenjapyx Silvestri, 1948

== Extinct genera ==
- †Ferrojapyx Wilson & Martill, 2001
- †Onychojapyx Pierce, 1950
