= List of insect orders =

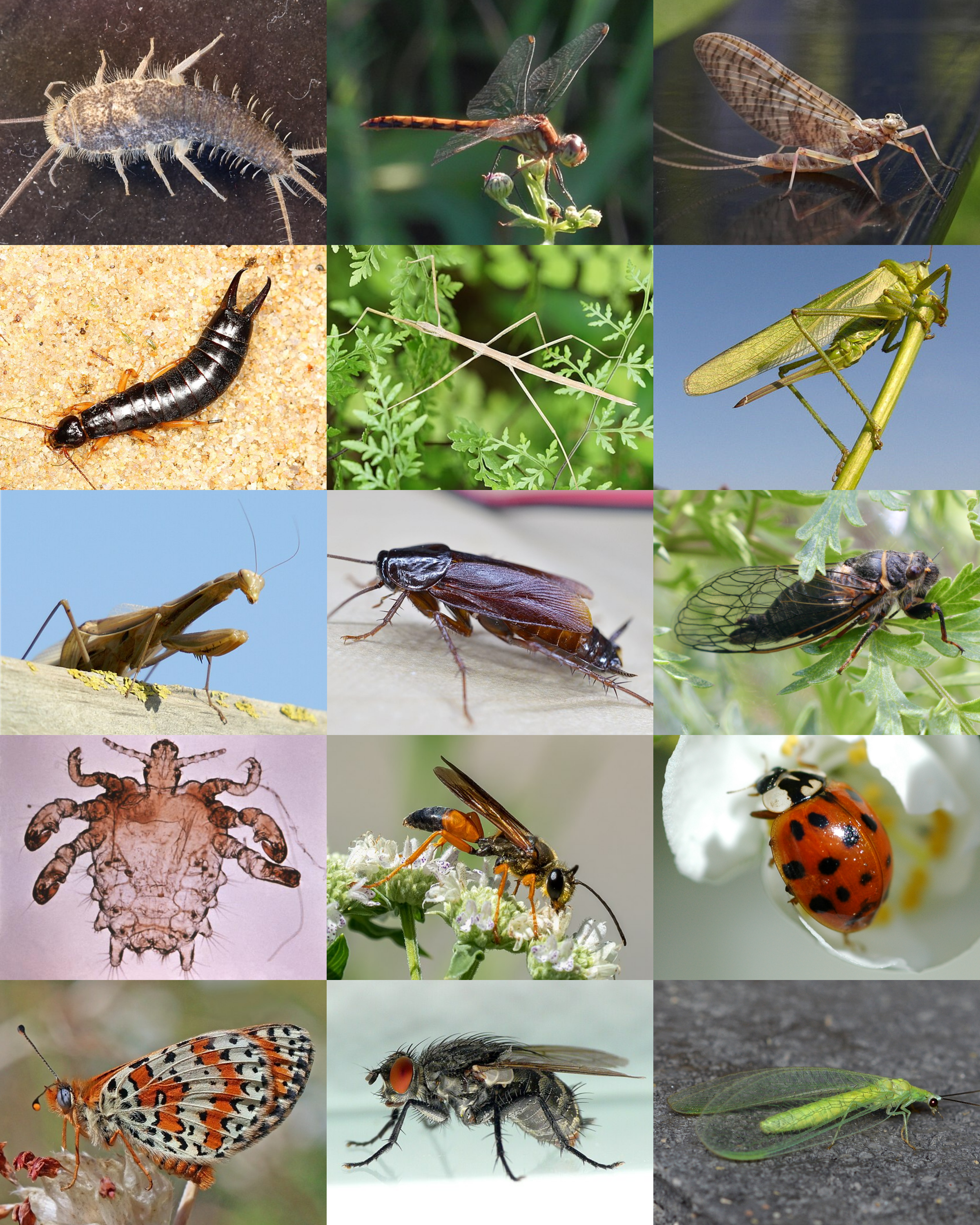
A side-by-side of insect species from fifteen different orders, from top to bottom: Zygentoma, Odonata, Ephemeroptera; Dermaptera, Phasmatodea, Orthoptera; Mantodea, Blattodea, Hemiptera; Psocodea, Hymenoptera, Coleoptera; Lepidoptera, Diptera, Neuroptera

Insecta is a class of invertebrates that consists of around 30 individual extant orders. Orders are the fifth taxonomic rank used to classify living organisms, below the rank of class, but above the rank of family. With around 1 million insect species having been formally described and assigned a binomial name, insects are the most diverse group of animals, comprising approximately half of extant species on Earth. The total insect biodiversity has been estimated at around 6 million species. The most diverse orders are Coleoptera (beetles), Hymenoptera (wasps, bees, ants and sawflies), Lepidoptera (butterflies and moths), Diptera (flies) and Hemiptera (true bugs). Taxonomists disagree on the exact number of orders, with opinions ranging from 26 to 32 distinct extant orders.

Insecta was originally divided into seven orders in 1758 by Carl Linnaeus in the 10th edition of Systema Naturae. When Insecta was originally described it was split into two informal groups, Paleoptera and Neoptera. Insects that do not have the ability to fold their wings over their abdomen were sorted into Paleoptera, and ones that could (or had an ancestor that could) were sorted into Neoptera. Individual orders were primarily defined by the number and structure of wings, with other factors such as antennae being considered. The classification of insects changes as new discoveries are found, with species regularly shifted around different orders. The most recent order described was the monotypic (an order with only one family) Mantophasmatodea in 2002.

== Apterygota ==
Apterygota is a paraphyletic (a grouping that consists of the grouping's last common ancestor and some but not all of its descendant lineages) group containing two orders of primitive and wingless insects, historically united on the basis of morphology.

Orders of Apterygota
Order (Note: The author citation (last name and year of the person(s) who originally described the order) is listed under the order name.)	Common name(s)	Description	Number of species (Note: The exact number of species changes as new ones are described; the figures described are based on a 2013 report by Zhi-Qiang Zhang, and orders with more than 100 species are rounded to the nearest hundred.)	Image
Archaeognatha Börner, 1904	Jumping bristletails	The Archaeognatha are the most evolutionarily primitive taxa (remaining mostly unchanged since their most recent common ancestor) in insects. Species are characterized by their elongated bodies and retractable mouthparts. They have an arched thorax and a small head. Bodies are cylindrical and do not have any scales. They are distributed globally and prefer woodland areas. Their tails consist of three long structures and they can use them to jump up to 12 inches (30 cm).	500	Trigoniophthalmus alternatus
Zygentoma Börner, 1904	Silverfish and firebrats	Species of Zygentoma are usually flat with two lengthy cerci (a pair of appendages on the rear segment). The most widely distributed species is the silverfish (Lepisma saccharinum). The thoraxes are wide, and the surface is covered in small dry scales. Most live under bark or litter structures. They are most common in humid environments, but some species have developed to withstand higher temperatures.	600	Ctenolepisma lineatum

== Palaeoptera ==
Palaeoptera is an infraclass (the taxonomic rank directly below subclass) of insects with two existing orders. Wings of Palaeoptera cannot be folded back when they are not being used, and species undergo hemimetaboly (metamorphosis missing one or more stages rather than complete metamorphosis).

Orders of Palaeoptera
Order	Common name(s)	Description	Number of species	Image
Ephemeroptera Hyatt & Arms, 1890	Mayflies	Ephemeroptera are small aquatic insects found primarily in North America. Females lay their eggs in water and do not feed during the adult stage. They spend almost their entire lives as larvae (sometimes up to a year), before growing into adults and living for one or two days.	3,100	Rhithrogena germanica
Odonata Fabricius, 1793	Dragonflies and damselflies	Odonata consists primarily of dragonflies and damselflies. They are large, narrow insects characterised by clear wings and a long abdomen. Species are brightly colored and up to four inches in length. They are aquatic and lay their eggs in or around bodies of water.	6,000	Onychogomphus forcipatus

== Polyneoptera ==
Polyneoptera is a group of winged insects that possess four wings, long antennae and mouths specialized for chewing. (Note: Some species in Phasmatodea, Dermaptera and Zoraptera are secondarily wingless having lost their wings during evolution.) When stationary, their wings are typically folded over their body flat. They are hemimetabolous, hatching as nymphs which gradually acquire their adult morphology through successive moults.

Orders of Polyneoptera
Order	Common name(s)	Description	Number of species	Image
Blattodea Wattenwyl, 1882	Cockroaches and termites	Blattodea is an order that contains cockroaches and termites. They have oval bodies and short cerci (appendages situated on the rear). They are most common in tropical climates and can live as pests in human structures.	8,600	Therea petiveriana
Dermaptera De Geer, 1773	Earwigs	Dermaptera are slender insects with beaded antennae, a segmented body and pincer-like cerci.	2,000	Forficula auricularia
Embioptera Lameere, 1900	Webspinners	Embioptera is an order of small insects with long, cylindrical bodies. They have short legs and two cerci. Some males have two pairs of wings, and females have none.	500	Notoligotoma nitens
Grylloblattodea Brues & Melander, 1932	Ice crawlers	Grylloblattodea is a rare group of insects found in Asia and North America. Their bodies are adapted to survive in cold and mountain climates. Grylloblattodea is sometimes ranked as a suborder of the order Notoptera, alongside Mantophasmatodea.	500	Grylloblatta sp.
Mantodea Burmeister, 1838	Mantises (or praying mantises)	Mantodea is an order of insects that usually prey on other insects. They exhibit a diverse range of colors and shapes, and are distributed worldwide.	2,400	Mantis religiosa
Mantophasmatodea Zompro et al., 2002	Gladiators or heelwalkers	Mantophasmatodea is a monotypic order of wingless insects. It is the smallest insect order and was first described in 2002. They are found exclusively in Southwest Africa. They have cylindrical bodies and tarsi segmented into five parts. Mantophasmatodea is sometimes ranked as a suborder of Notoptera, alongside Grylloblattodea.	23	Mantophasma zephyra
Orthoptera Latreille, 1793	Grasshoppers, crickets, and locusts	Orthoptera is an order of insects that consists of crickets, grasshoppers, and locusts. Most individuals live for around one year and undergo simple metamorphosis with three stages.	24,500	Metrioptera roeselii
Phasmatodea Jacobson & Bianchi, 1902	Stick insects and leaf insects	Phasmatodea is an order of large and slim insects, originating in the Australasian region. Species have evolved their bodies to camouflage themselves among leaves and twigs. They are dorso-ventrally flattened, and primarily concentrated in Asia and Australasia.	3,100	Leptynia hispanica
Plecoptera Burmeister, 1839	Stoneflies	Plecoptera is a small order of insects that is distributed globally. It is most common in temperate climates. Species usually have small ocelli and dorso-ventrally flattened bodies.	3,800	Perla sp.
Zoraptera Silvestri, 1913	Angel insects	Zoraptera is a small order primarily found in tropical regions. Species are usually four millimeters or less and have two forms: dark, winged alates, with both eyes and ocelli, and pale, wingless, blind individuals.	45	Zorotypus sp.

== Paraneoptera ==
Paraneoptera is a superorder of insects that undergo hemimetaboly. Many species are agricultural pests, damaging the plants that they feed on. The lifespan of species in Paraneoptera are short, with some lasting 6 weeks or less.

Orders of Paraneoptera
Order	Common name(s)	Description	Number of species	Image
Hemiptera Linnaeus, 1758	True bugs	Hemiptera have piercing mouthparts that are used to suck from their food, with species exhibiting a cone or beak shaped structure.	104,200	Cimex lectularius
Psocodea Hennig, 1966	Barklice, booklice, and parasitic lice	Psocodea is a group of small insects with soft bodies. It consists primarily of lice, and species are dorso-ventrally flattened across their bodies.	5,700	Columbicola columbae
Thysanoptera Haliday, 1836	Thrips	Thysanoptera are small winged insects that feed on plants. They are usually no more than two millimeters in length and are attracted to bright colors.	6,100	Frankliniella occidentalis

== Holometabola ==
Holometabola is a group of insects that are characterized by complete metamorphosis (insects that go through egg, larva, pupa and adult stages). The orders Coleoptera, Hymenoptera, Diptera and Lepidoptera contain the greatest number of species in this group (more than 99%).

Orders of Holometabola
Order	Common name(s)	Description	Number of species	Image
Coleoptera Linnaeus, 1758	Beetles	Coleoptera is the largest order of insects, and contains a quarter of all extant animals. They are characterized by hardened forewings called elytra. Most species can fly, while some species in desert regions have lost the ability.	392,400	Dynastes hercules
Diptera Linnaeus, 1758	Flies	Diptera is a large, globally distributed order of insects. Species have one set of wings (Note: Some parasitic species in alpine regions have lost their wings through evolution.) and a pair of organs called halteres to help with balance.	160,600	Chrysomya megacephala
Hymenoptera Linnaeus, 1758	Bees, wasps, ants and sawflies	Hymenoptera is a large order of insects that primarily consists of bees, wasps, and ants. 6,000 to 7,000 new species are described each year. Hymenoptera play a significant role in plant pollination and the development of crops.	155,500	Apis mellifera
Lepidoptera Linnaeus, 1758	Butterflies and moths	Lepidoptera consists of butterflies and moths. They are characterized by the scales covering their wings. They exist on all continents except Antarctica and have a diverse range of colors and sizes.	158,600	Aglais io
Mecoptera Packard, 1886	Scorpionflies	Mecoptera is an order of insects primarily distributed in Australasian and Neotropical areas. They range in length from two millimeters to 35 millimeters. The families Panorpidae and Bitticidae contain the majority of extant species. Some phylogenies recover Siphonaptera as part of an otherwise paraphyletic Mecoptera. In that case, Siphonaptera may be assigned a lower rank within the order Mecoptera, or the mecopteran families Nannochoristidae and Boreidae may be regarded as the separate orders Nannomecoptera and Neomecoptera.	800	Panorpa communis
Megaloptera Latreille, 1802	Alderflies, dobsonflies, fishflies	Megaloptera is a small order of insects commonly found in aquatic areas. The adults have long, segmented antennae and are usually winged. Species undergo all four stages of metamorphosis during development.	400	Protosialis americana
Neuroptera Linnaeus, 1758	Lacewings	Neuroptera is an order of insects distributed globally. They have two pairs of wings and long antennae.	5,900	Chrysopa formosa
Raphidioptera Handlirsch, 1908	Snakeflies	Raphidioptera is an order of predatory insects with elongated prothoraxes. Some taxonomists have grouped Raphidioptera together with the related Megaloptera.	300	Dichrostigma flavipes
Siphonaptera Latreille, 1825	Fleas	Siphonaptera is an order of blood-sucking insects that are globally distributed. They are most prevalent in temperate climates. Siphonaptera primarily feed on mammals, although some species feed on birds as well.	2,100	A microscopic photo of a pink flea
Strepsiptera Kirby, 1813	Twisted-wing parasites	Strepsiptera is an order of small obligate endoparasites divided into 12 families (10 extant and two extinct). The males range in length from one millimeter (0.039 in) to seven millimeters (0.28 in). The females range in length from two millimeters (0.079 in) to 30 millimetres (1.2 in). In Stylopidia, which comprises the vast majority of species, females are permanent endoparasites and possess reduced legs, antennae, and eyes.	600	Stylops melittae (male) Mengenilla moldrzyki (female)
Trichoptera Kirby, 1813	Caddisflies	Trichoptera is an order of insects found in freshwater areas.	15,200	Limnephilus rhombicus
