= P. maritimus =

P. maritimus may refer to:

- Petrobius maritimus, the shore bristletail or sea bristletail, a species of Archaeognatha
- Pseudococcus maritimus, the grape mealybug, is a scale insect species

== See also ==
- Maritimus (disambiguation)
