= Haplodiploidy =

Biological system where sex is determined by the number of sets of chromosomes

In the Hymenoptera, the sex-determination system involves haploid males and diploid females. System for honey bee shown.

Haplodiploidy is a sex-determination system in which males develop from unfertilized eggs and are haploid with one set of chromosomes, and females develop from fertilized eggs and are diploid with two sets of chromosomes.

Jan Dzierżon discovered in 1835 that an unfertilised queen bee could produce male offspring. In 1903, Friedrich Meyes showed that male bees produced sperm without reduction division, i.e. they were haploid like their sperm.

Haplodiploidy is universal in the Hymenoptera (ants, bees, and wasps) and Thysanoptera (thrips), and occurs in some other arthropods including scale insects and spider mites, and in some rotifers. Haplodiploidy makes worker bees unusually closely related; it has been proposed that this helped eusociality to evolve in the Hymenoptera, but a survey of many taxa has found no evidence that this occurred. Haplodiploidy is neither necessary nor sufficient for eusociality to evolve, as there are both social and non-social species in the Hymenoptera, and there are species in other groups (such as mole-rats) which are eusocial but not haplodiploid.

In honeybees, sex is determined by the complementary sex determiner (csd) gene; individuals heterozygous for the gene become female. In Nasonia chalcidoid wasps, sex is determined instead by a maternal effect gene, MEGISD.

== History of discovery ==
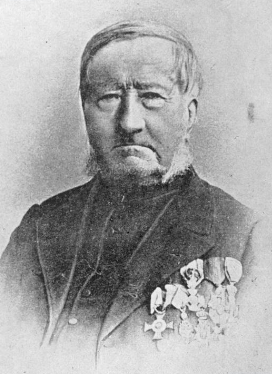
Jan Dzierżon discovered that male bees grew from unfertilised eggs.

In 1835, the priest and beekeeper Jan Dzierżon (1811–1906) found that a queen bee with an injured wing (and hence unable to make her mating flight) and an empty spermatheca had produced male offspring (drones). He conjectured that honeybee males grow from unfertilised eggs, publishing his findings in 1845.

In 1903, the cytologist Friedrich Meves (1868–1923) showed that male bees produced sperm without reduction division of their chromosomes. This meant that the males had the same number of chromosomes as their sperm (a single set, unlike the two sets in female bees), i.e. that the males were haploid.

== Mechanisms ==
Haplodiploidy is a sex-determination system in which males develop from unfertilized eggs and are haploid, and females develop from fertilized eggs and are diploid. This mechanism is called arrhenotoky, though definitions vary; other mechanisms can produce a similar result.

After mating, each fertile hymenopteran female stores sperm in an internal sac called the spermatheca. The mated female controls the release of stored sperm from within the organ: If she releases sperm as an egg passes down her oviduct, the egg is fertilized. In solitary hymenopterans, the females lay unfertilized male eggs on poorer food sources while laying the fertilized female eggs on better food sources, possibly because the fitness of females is more adversely affected by shortages in their early life.

=== Sex determination in honey bees ===
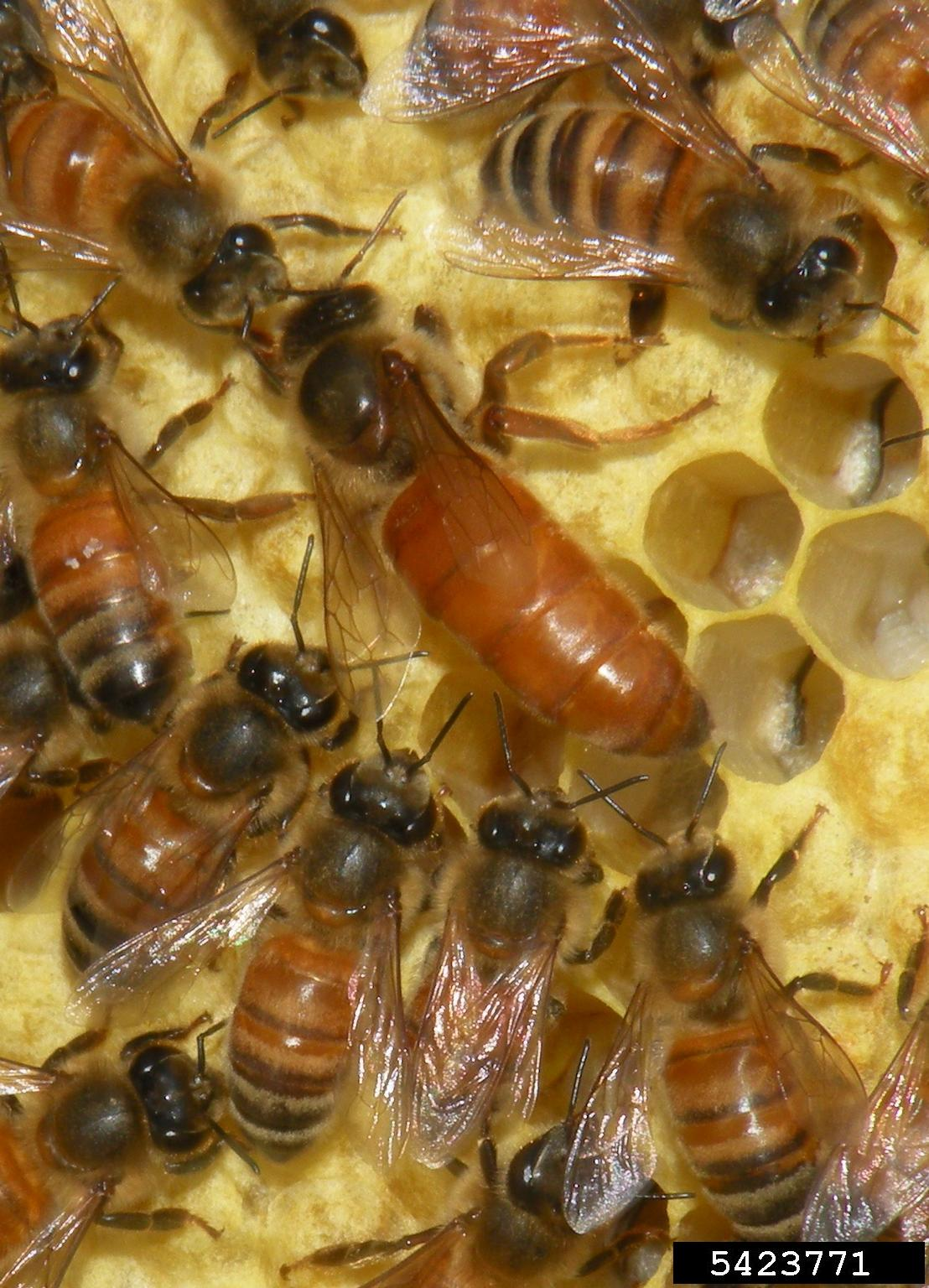
Worker bees are unusually closely related to each other because of their inheritance system.

In honeybees, the drones (males) are entirely derived from the queen, their mother. The diploid queen has two sets of chromosomes (2N=32) and the haploid drones have one set (N=16). Drones therefore produce sperm cells that contain their entire genome, so the sperm are all genetically identical except for mutations. The male bees' genetic makeup is entirely derived from the mother, while the genetic makeup of the female worker bees is derived half from the mother, and half from the father. It is possible for a laying worker bee to lay an unfertilised egg, which is always a male; this is more likely after swarming.

=== Complementary sex determiner gene ===
Sex determination in honey bees is initially due to a single locus, the complementary sex determiner (csd) gene. Bee embryos that are heterozygous for the csd gene develop into females, while those that are hemizygous (only one copy of csd is present) or homozygous for the csd gene develop into males. Individuals homozygous at this gene locus are the rare instances of diploid males. There are rare instances of diploid drone larvae. This usually occurs when there have been more than two generations of brother-sister mating, resulting in the same alleles at the csd locus (i.e. they are homozygous). Diploid males do not survive to adulthood, as the nurse worker bees cannibalize them when newly-hatched. The csd system is ancestral in the Hymenoptera, and is thus a synapomorphy.

The complementary sex determination mechanism in bees uses multiple alleles of a single gene, csd.

=== Maternal effects ===
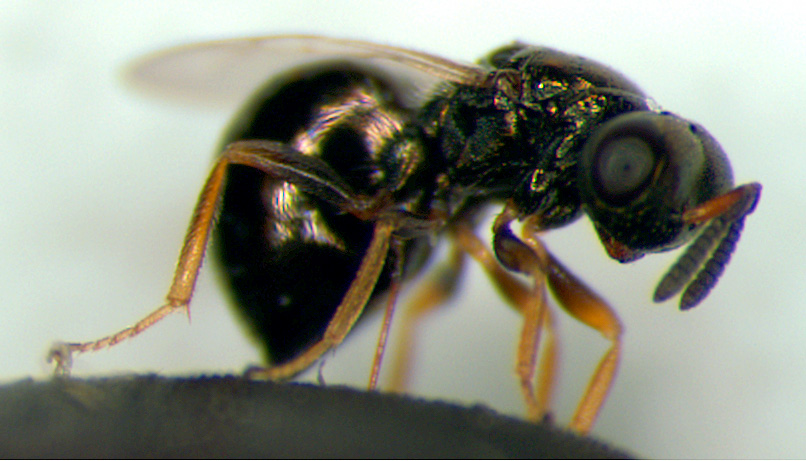
Nasonia chalcidoid wasps use a non-csd mechanism (MEGISD) to determine sex.

In chalcidoid wasps of the genus Nasonia, the method of sex determination does not involve the complementary sex determiner (csd) gene. The mechanism, Maternal Effect Genomic Imprinting Sex Determination (MEGISD), involves a masculinizing/virilizing maternal effect gene that "imprints upon" the oocyte cytoplasm, and an "unimprinted" paternal contribution (in female offspring) provides a counter effect to virilization, allowing female development to occur. All diploid eggs become female, unlike with the csd mechanism where diploid eggs can become males if they are homozygous or hemizygous.

== Taxonomic range ==
Haplodiploidy determines the sex in all members of the insect orders Hymenoptera (bees, ants, wasps and sawflies) and Thysanoptera (thrips). Elsewhere in the animal kingdom, haplodiploidy occurs in spider mites, the scorpion Tityus metuendus, some hemipteran bugs such as scale insects, a few coleopterans, such as the bark beetle Micromalthus debilis and ambrosia beetles in the Xyleborini tribe including Xylosandrus germanus, as well as some rotifers.

- Animalia
  - Rotifers
    - e.g. Brachionus plicatilis
  - Arthropoda
    - Chelicerata
      - Spider mites (1200 spp.)
      - Scorpiones
        - Tityus metuendus
    - Insecta
      - Paraneoptera
        - Hemiptera
          - Scale insects (8000 spp.)
        - Thysanoptera (7700 spp.)
      - Holometabola
        - a few Coleoptera
          - e.g. Micromalthus debilis
          - e.g. Xylosandrus
        - Hymenoptera (>150,000 spp.)

== Features ==
The haplodiploid sex-determination system has several peculiarities. A male has no father and cannot have sons, but he has a grandfather and can have grandsons. Additionally, if a eusocial-insect colony has only one queen, and she has only mated once, then the relatedness between workers (diploid females) in a nest is on average 3/4. This means the workers in such monogamous single-queen colonies are significantly more closely related than in other sex determination systems where the relatedness of siblings is usually no more than 1/2.

Another feature is that recessive lethal and deleterious alleles are removed from the population rapidly, because they are automatically expressed in the males, killing or harming every individual they arise in.

=== Relatedness ratios ===
Relatedness is used to calculate the strength of kin selection (via Hamilton's rule). The haplodiploidy hypothesis proposes that the unusual 3/4 relatedness coefficient amongst full haplodiploid sisters is responsible for the frequency of evolution of eusocial behavior in hymenopterans. A eusocial worker helping her mother birth more sisters propagates more of her own genes than had she reproduced herself.

In normal sexual reproduction, the father has two sets of chromosomes, and crossing over takes place between the chromatids of each pair during the meiosis which produces the sperm. Therefore, the sperms are not identical, because in each chromosome of a pair there are different alleles at many of the loci. Thus the amount of sharing with male and female relatives is the same.

Shared gene proportions in XY system
Relationship	Ratio
Child	1/2
Parent	1/2
Sibling	1/2
Aunt or uncle	1/4
Niece or nephew	1/4

But when the father is haploid all the sperms are identical (except for a small number where gene mutations have taken place in the germ line). So, all female offspring inherit the male's chromosomes 100% intact. As long as a female has mated with only one male, all her daughters share a complete set of chromosomes from that male. In the Hymenoptera, males generally produce enough sperm to last the female for her whole lifetime after a single mating event with that male.

Shared gene proportions in haplodiploid system (assuming queen only mates once)
Sex	Female	Male
Daughter	1/2	1
Son	1/2	—N/a
Mother	1/2	1
Father	1/2	—N/a
Sister	3/4	1/2
Brother	1/4	1/2
Maternal Aunt	3 /8	3/4
Maternal Uncle	1/8	1/4
Paternal Aunt	1/4	—N/a
Paternal Uncle	1/4	—N/a
Niece (sister's daughter)	3/8	1/4
Niece (brother's daughter)	1/4	1/2
Nephew (sister's son)	3/8	1/4

== Evolution of eusociality ==
Given that social insects are often haplodiploid, biologists have debated whether haplodiploidy paved the way for the evolution of eusociality, the highly organised form of sociality in animals involving castes, some of which may not reproduce.

While workers can lay unfertilized eggs that become their sons, haplodiploidy increases the individual's fitness due to kin selection. Since the worker is more related to the queen's daughters (her sisters) than to her own offspring, a worker's fitness is increased more by helping the queen's offspring to survive than by the worker's having offspring herself.

Batches of worker bees are short-lived and are constantly being replaced by the next batch, so this kin selection could be a strategy to ensure the proper working of the hive. However, since queens usually mate with a dozen drones or more, not all workers are full sisters. In many other species of bees, including bumblebees, the queen mates with only one drone. This means that sisters are almost always more related to one another than they would be to their own offspring, thus eliminating the conflict of variable relatedness present in honeybees.

=== Argument that haplodiploidy led to eusociality ===
According to inclusive fitness theory, organisms can gain fitness by increasing the reproductive output of other individuals that share their genes, especially their close relatives. Natural selection favors the helping of relatives when the cost of helping is less than the benefit gained by their relative multiplied by the fraction of genes that they share, i.e. when

Cost < Relatedness * Benefit

The British evolutionary biologist W. D. Hamilton suggested in 1964 that eusociality could evolve more easily among haplodiploid species such as Hymenoptera, because of their unusual relatedness structure.

In haplodiploid species, sisters share 75% of their genes with each other, so they are more closely related to their sisters than they would be to their own offspring. Even though workers often do not reproduce, they can pass on more of their genes by helping to raise their sisters than by having their own offspring (with only 50% of their genes). This unusual situation, where females have greater fitness when they help rear sisters rather than producing offspring, has been proposed as an explanation of the nine or more parallel evolutions of eusociality within the Hymenoptera.

If kin selection did drive the evolution of eusociality, monogamy (queens mating singly) should be the ancestral state, because it maximizes the relatedness of colony members. This is the case for all eusocial species so far investigated.

=== Argument that haplodiploidy did not lead to eusociality ===
Against the supposed benefits of haplodiploidy for eusociality, the American evolutionary biologist Robert Trivers noted that while haplodiploid females share 75% of genes with their sisters, they share only 25% of their genes with their brothers. Accordingly, the average relatedness of an individual to their sibling is 50%. Therefore, he argued, helping behavior would only be advantageous if it were biased to helping sisters, which would drive the population to a 1:3 sex ratio of males to females. At this ratio, males, as the rarer sex, increase in reproductive value, reducing the benefit of female-biased investment.

Further, not all eusocial species are haplodiploid: termites, some snapping shrimps, and mole-rats are not. Conversely, non-eusocial bees are haplodiploid. In addition, queens in eusocial species often mate with multiple males, resulting in a hive of half-sisters that share only 25% of their genes. The association between haplodiploidy and eusociality is below statistical significance. Haplodiploidy is thus neither necessary nor sufficient for eusociality to emerge.

Haplodiploidy is neither necessary nor sufficient for eusociality
	Eusocial	
Haplodiploid	Yes	No
Yes	Honey bees social wasps	Non-eusocial bees
No	Termites mole-rats	(most animals)

In 2026, an analysis of 5,678 insect species across all defined insect orders found no evidence that haplodiploidy promotes the evolution of eusociality.

== See also ==
- Green-beard effect
- Sexual differentiation
- Worker policing
- X0 sex-determination system
