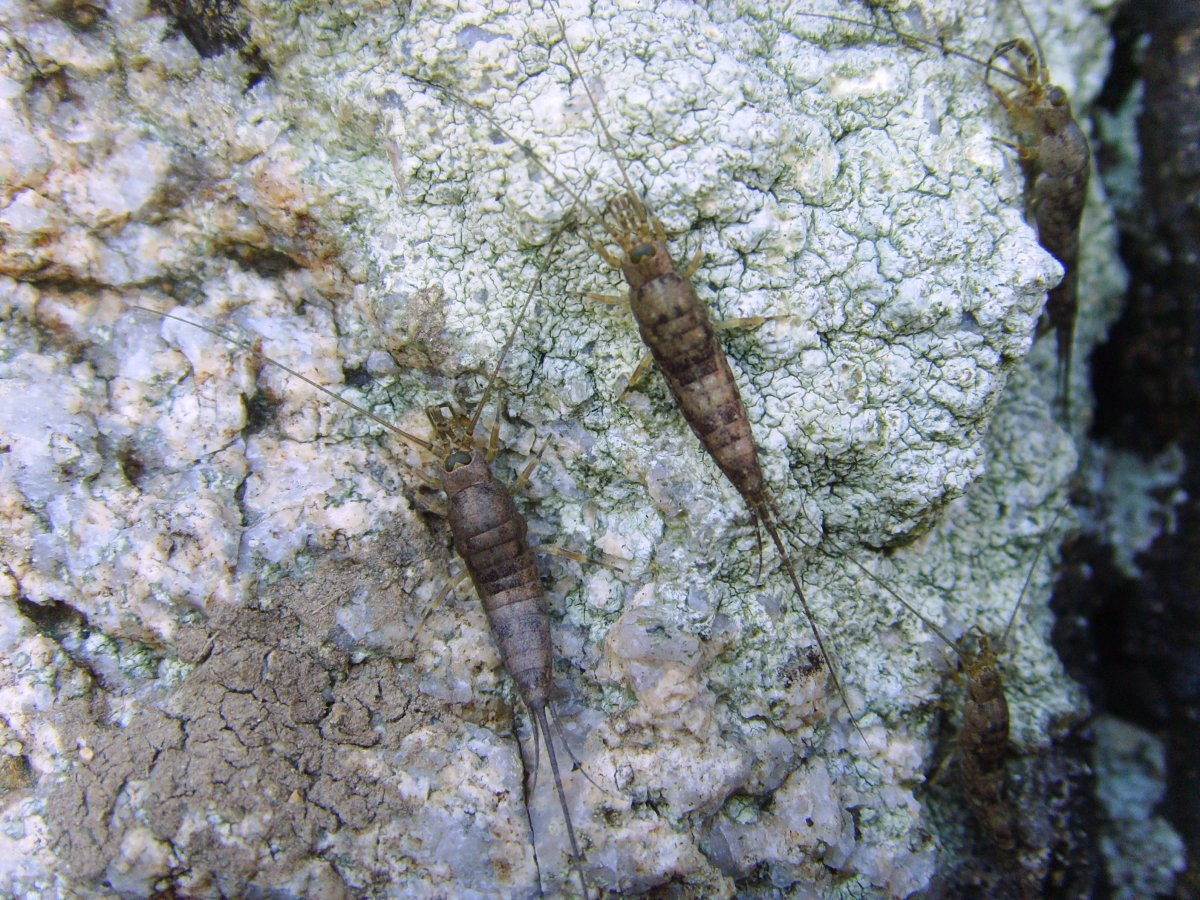

Scientific classification
- Kingdom: Animalia
- Phylum: Arthropoda
- Clade: Pancrustacea
- Class: Insecta
- Order: Archaeognatha
- Family: Machilidae
- Genus: Petrobius; Leach, 1809

Synonyms
- Halomachilis Verhoeff, 1912

= Petrobius =

Genus of jumping bristletails

Petrobius is a genus of jumping bristletails in the family Machilidae. Many of these ancestral insects are restricted to rocky shorelines especially of northern Europe and America.

== Species ==
The Global Biodiversity Information Facility lists:

1. Petrobius adriaticus Verhoeff, 1910
2. Petrobius artemisiae Mendes, 1980
3. Petrobius brevistylis Carpenter, 1913
4. Petrobius canadensis Paclt, 1969
5. Petrobius crimeus Kaplin, 1983
6. Petrobius imbricatus Koch & Berendt, 1854
7. Petrobius lohmanderi Agrell, 1944
8. Petrobius maritimus (Leach, 1809)
9. Petrobius montanus Kaplin, 2021
10. Petrobius ponticus Wygodzinsky, 1959
