= Petrobius artemisiae =

Scientific classification
- Kingdom: Animalia
- Phylum: Arthropoda
- Clade: Pancrustacea
- Class: Insecta
- Order: Archaeognatha
- Family: Machilidae
- Genus: Petrobius
- Species: P. artemisiae

Binomial name
- Petrobius artemisiae Mendes, 1980

Species of jumping bristletail

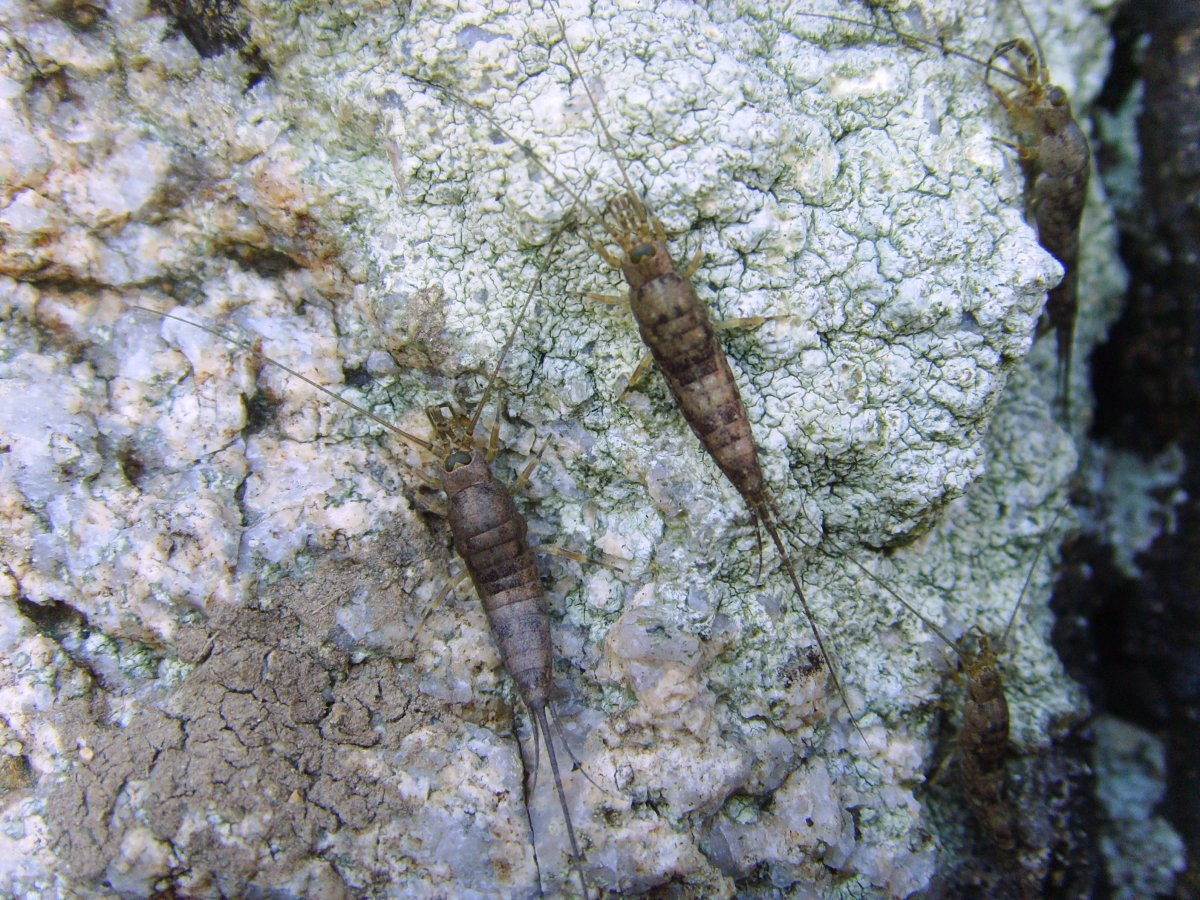
Image of a petrobius maritimus to demonstrate how a patrobius artemisie might appear

Petrobius artemisiae is a species of jumping bristletail in the family Machilidae.
