= Rhithrogena flavianula =

Scientific classification
- Domain: Eukaryota
- Kingdom: Animalia
- Phylum: Arthropoda
- Class: Insecta
- Order: Ephemeroptera
- Family: Heptageniidae
- Genus: Rhithrogena
- Species: R. flavianula

Binomial name
- Rhithrogena flavianula (McDunnough, 1924)

Synonyms
- Heptagenia flavianula McDunnough, 1924

Species of mayfly

Rhithrogena flavianula is a species of flatheaded mayfly in the family Heptageniidae. It is found in North America.
