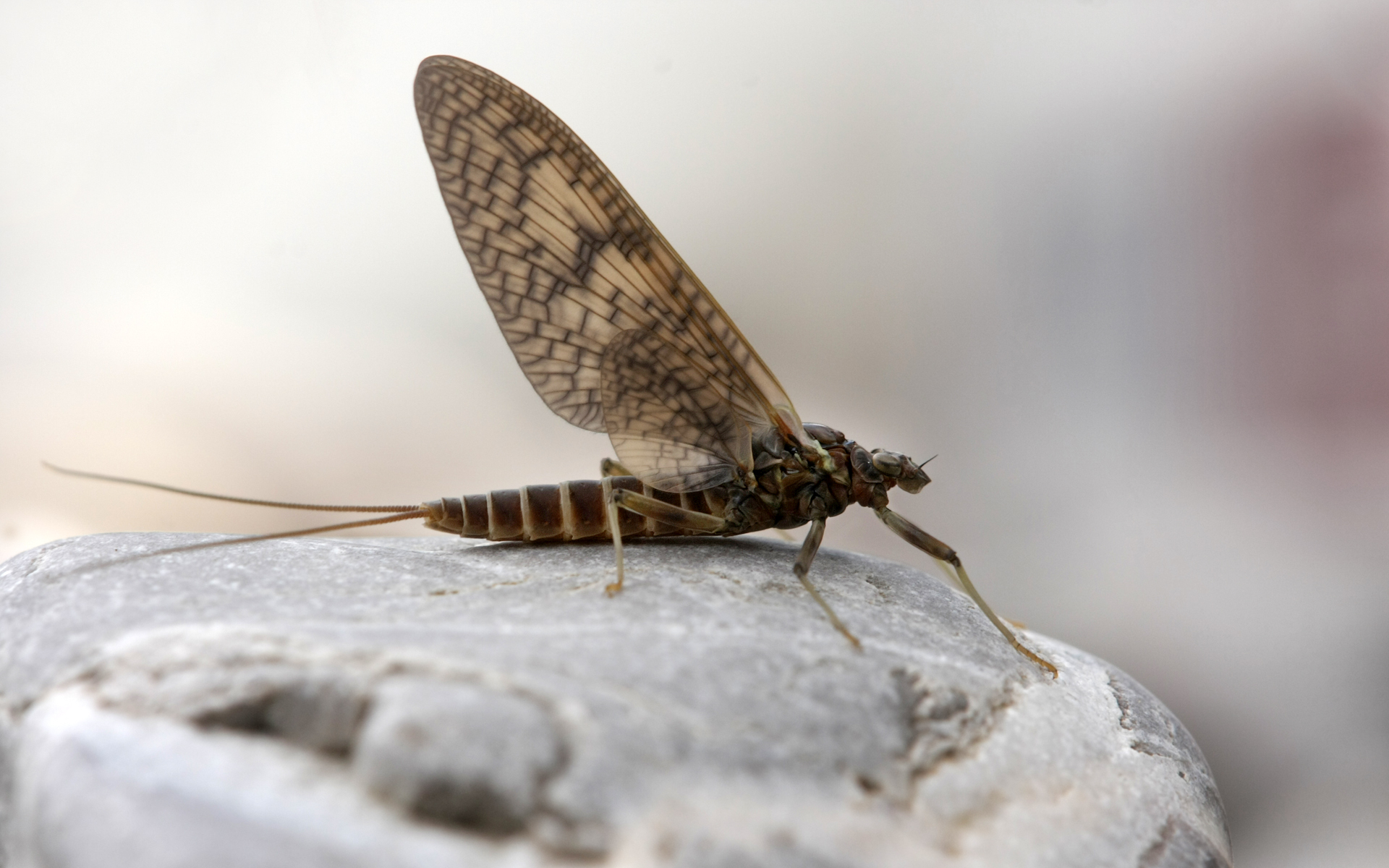
- Female R. germanica subimago, near Baierbrunn, Germany

Scientific classification
- Kingdom: Animalia
- Phylum: Arthropoda
- Clade: Pancrustacea
- Class: Insecta
- Order: Ephemeroptera
- Family: Heptageniidae
- Genus: Rhithrogena
- Species: R. germanica

Binomial name
- Rhithrogena germanica Eaton, 1885

Synonyms
- Rhithrogena haarupi Esben-Petersen, 1909; Rhithrogena ussingi Esben-Petersen, 1910; Rhithrogena fradgleyi Blair, 1929

= Rhithrogena germanica =

Species of mayfly

Rhithrogena germanica is a European species of mayfly, and is "probably the most famous of all British mayflies", because of its use in fly fishing. It is known in the British Isles as the March brown mayfly, a name which is used in the United States for a different species, Rhithrogena morrisoni. It emerges as a subimago at the end of winter, and can be distinguished from similar species by a dark spot on the femur of each leg.

== Description ==
Adults and subimagos of Rhithrogena species have two long tails, and readily visible hind wings. R. germanica can only be distinguished from related species such as R. semicolorata (the only other Rhithrogena species in the United Kingdom) by the presence of a dark spot on the femora of the legs.

A similar species, Ecdyonurus venosus (the late March brown or false March brown) is more widespread in Great Britain, but emerges later in the year than R. germanica.

== Distribution ==
Rhithrogena germanica is widespread across Central and Northern Europe. It is under threat across Europe, and Great Britain may be a stronghold for the species.

R. germanica was first described by Alfred Edwin Eaton based on a single male imago collected from the River Rhine at Laufenburg, Switzerland. Its current distribution in Switzerland only extends to a few tributaries of the Rhine (Limmat, Sihl, Thur, Töss).

In the British Isles, the range of R. germanica includes the River Tweed and River Don in Scotland, the River Coquet in England, the River Wye in Wales and the River Liffey in Ireland. In Germany, it has been reported from the federal states of Baden-Württemberg, Bavaria and Hesse. Further populations have been reported from Denmark, France, Czechoslovakia, and Poland; records from other areas may refer to other similar species, such as Rhithrogena sowai.

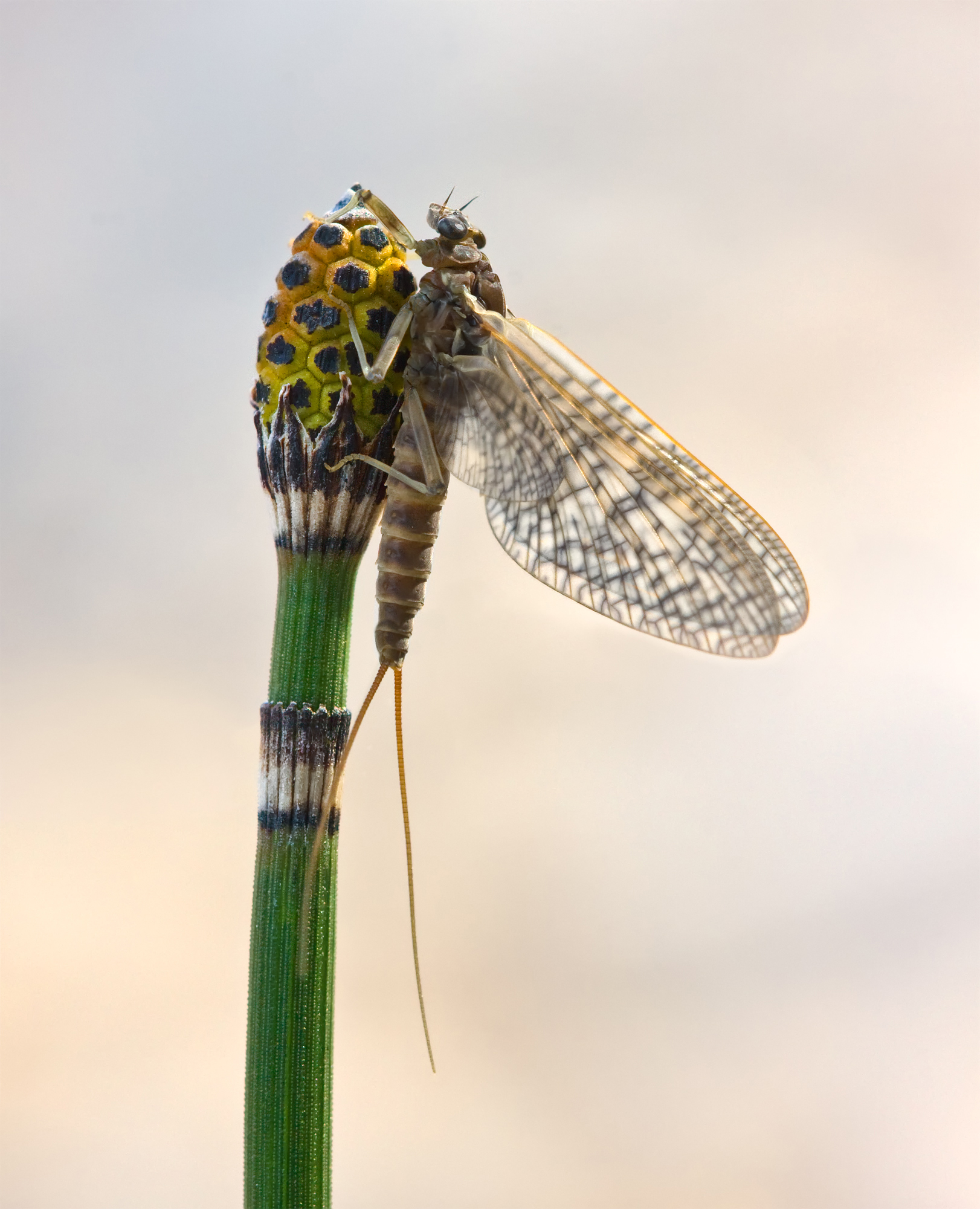
R. germanica subimago on Equisetum hyemale

== Life cycle ==
Like other mayflies, the naiads of R. germanica are aquatic insects, living on the bottoms of rivers. R. germanica can tolerate a small amount of pollution but requires high concentrations of dissolved oxygen, and is therefore found in large, clean, fast-flowing rivers. The larvae of R. germanica emerge very early in the year, at the end of winter or the start of spring (March to early April). The emerging adults are vulnerable to predators, and so their emergence is very fast; the whole process of moulting and taking flight can take as little as 30 seconds.

Mayflies are the only insects to have two distinct adult stages: a subimago, which moults into the imago. Rhithrogena germanica has the longest–lasting subimago stage of any mayfly, allowing up to four days before moulting into the imago, during which time the subimago rests in a tree near the river it emerged from.

Mayfly adults have no functioning mouthparts and, after reproducing, they die.

== Fly fishing ==
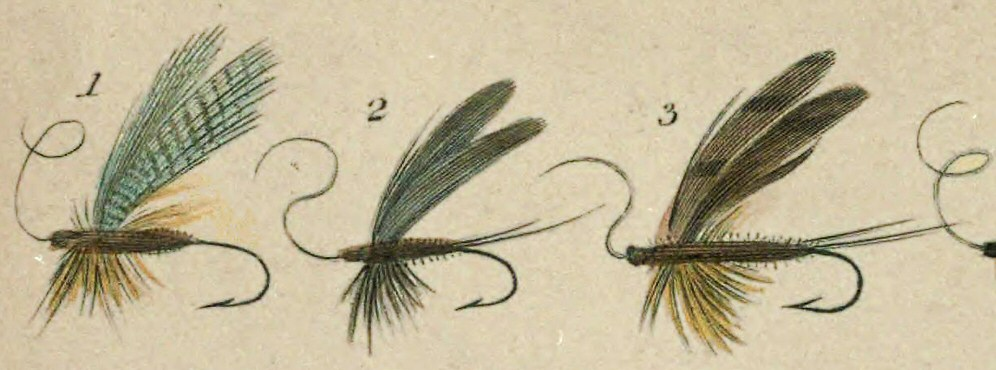
Fishing flies from Charles Bowlker's Art of Angling, 1854. 3. March brown

The March brown is "probably the most famous of all British mayflies", having been copied by anglers to catch fish for over 500 years. It is taken by trout.
