= Trigoniophthalmus tseyi =

Scientific classification
- Kingdom: Animalia
- Phylum: Arthropoda
- Clade: Pancrustacea
- Class: Insecta
- Order: Archaeognatha
- Family: Machilidae
- Genus: Trigoniophthalmus
- Species: T. tseyi

Binomial name
- Trigoniophthalmus tseyi Kaplin, 2019

Species of archaeognatha

Trigoniophthalmus tseyi is a species in the genus Trigoniophthalmus of the family Machilidae which belongs to the insect order Archaeognatha (jumping bristletails).
