= Trigoniophthalmus hussoni =

Scientific classification
- Kingdom: Animalia
- Phylum: Arthropoda
- Clade: Pancrustacea
- Class: Insecta
- Order: Archaeognatha
- Family: Machilidae
- Genus: Trigoniophthalmus
- Species: T. hussoni

Binomial name
- Trigoniophthalmus hussoni Wygodzinsky, 1958

Species of archaeognatha

Trigoniophthalmus hussoni is a species in the genus Trigoniophthalmus of the family Machilidae which belongs to the insect order Archaeognatha (jumping bristletails).
