= Rhithrogena impersonata =

Scientific classification
- Domain: Eukaryota
- Kingdom: Animalia
- Phylum: Arthropoda
- Class: Insecta
- Order: Ephemeroptera
- Family: Heptageniidae
- Genus: Rhithrogena
- Species: R. impersonata

Binomial name
- Rhithrogena impersonata (McDunnough, 1925)

Synonyms
- Heptagenia impersonata McDunnough, 1925; Rhithrogena sanguinea Ide, 1954

Species of mayfly

Rhithrogena impersonata is a species of flatheaded mayfly in the family Heptageniidae. It is found in North America.
