= Petrobius lohmanderi =

Scientific classification
- Kingdom: Animalia
- Phylum: Arthropoda
- Clade: Pancrustacea
- Class: Insecta
- Order: Archaeognatha
- Family: Machilidae
- Genus: Petrobius
- Species: P. lohmanderi

Binomial name
- Petrobius lohmanderi Agrell, 1944

Species of archaeognatha

Petrobius lohmanderi is a species in the genus Petrobius of the family Machilidae which belongs to the insect order Archaeognatha (jumping bristletails).
