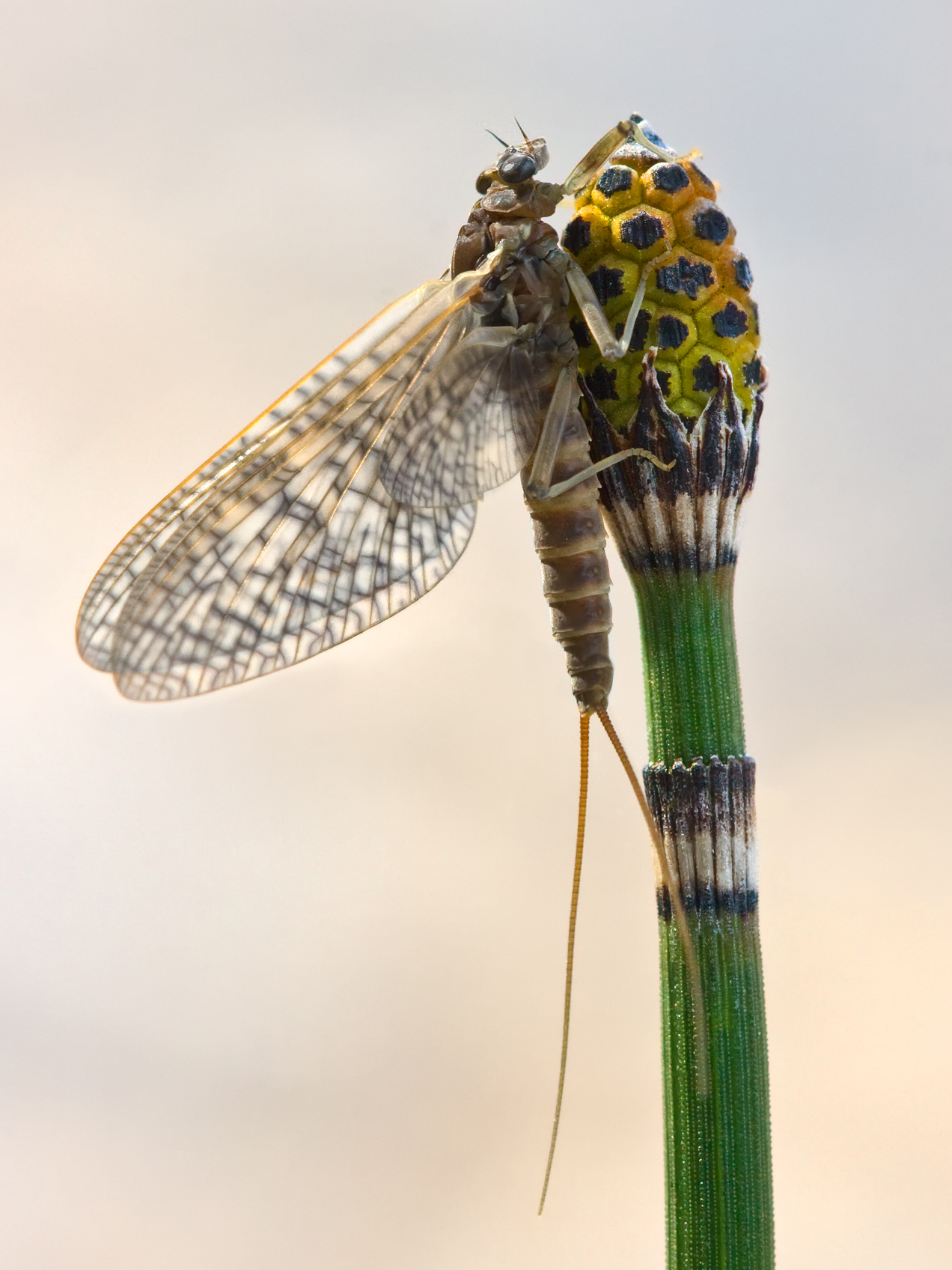
- Rhithrogena germanica

Scientific classification
- Kingdom: Animalia
- Phylum: Arthropoda
- Class: Insecta
- Order: Ephemeroptera
- Family: Heptageniidae
- Genus: Rhithrogena; Eaton, 1881

Diversity
- at least 150 species

= Rhithrogena =

Genus of mayflies

Rhithrogena is a genus of flatheaded mayflies in the family Heptageniidae. There are 153 species in Rhithrogena.

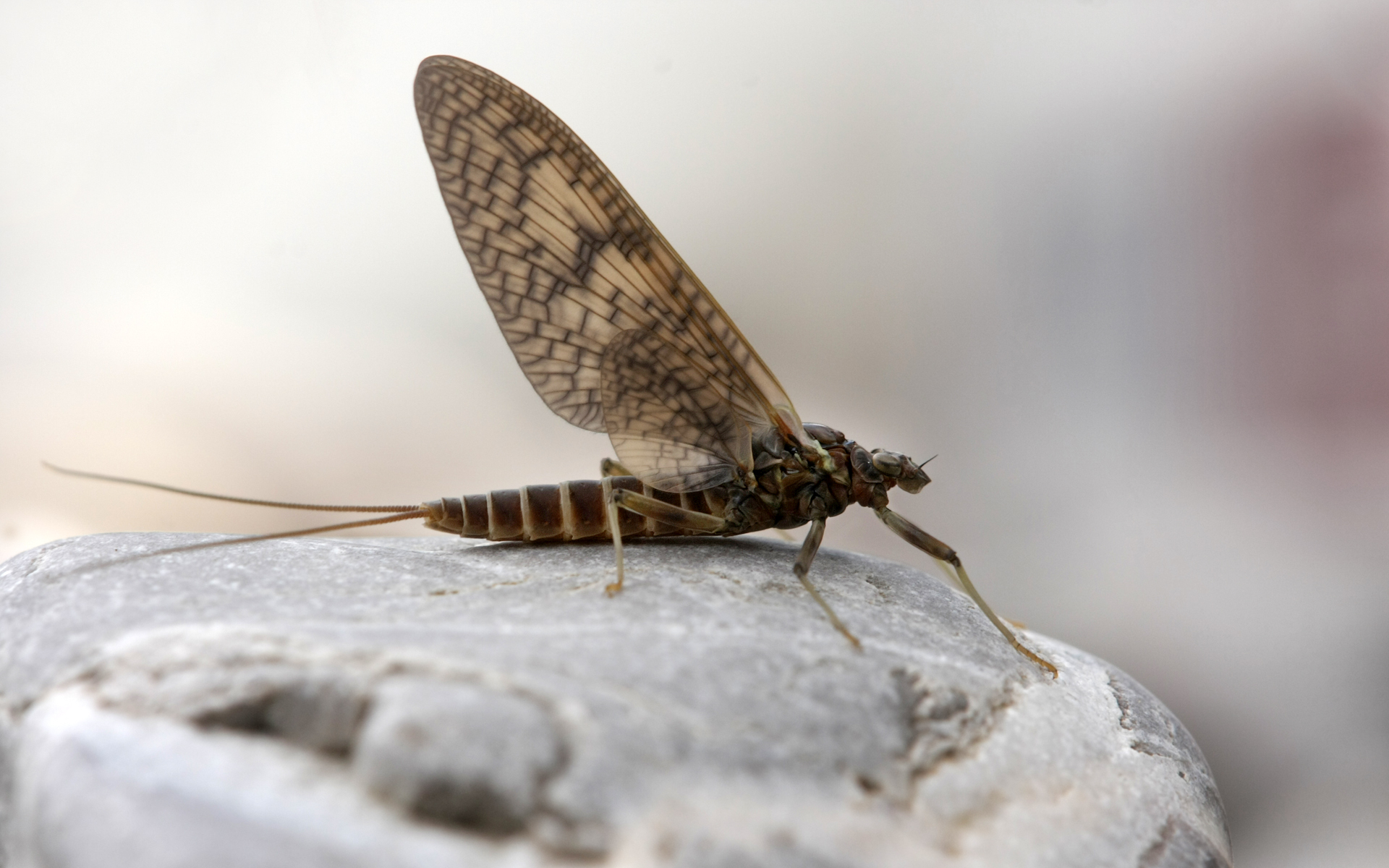
Female Rhithrogena germanica subimago

== Species ==
- Rhithrogena adrianae Belfiore, 1983^{c g}
- Rhithrogena allobrogica Sowa & Degrange, 1987^{c g}
- Rhithrogena alpestris Eaton, 1885^{c g}
- Rhithrogena amica Traver, 1935^{i c g}
- Rhithrogena ampla Kang & Yang, 1994^{c g}
- Rhithrogena amseli (Demoulin, 1964)^{c g}
- Rhithrogena anatolica Kazanci, 1985^{c g}
- Rhithrogena anomala McDunnough, 1928^{i c g}
- Rhithrogena austriaca Sowa & Weichselbaumer, 1988^{c g}
- Rhithrogena ayadi Dakki & Thomas, 1986^{c g}
- Rhithrogena bajkovae Sowa, 1973^{c g}
- Rhithrogena basiri Ali, 1971^{c g}
- Rhithrogena beskidensis Alba-Tercedor & Sowa, 1987^{c g}
- Rhithrogena binervis Kluge, 1987^{c g}
- Rhithrogena bogoescui Sowa & Degrange, 1987^{c g}
- Rhithrogena braaschi Jacob, 1974^{c g}
- Rhithrogena brodskyi Kustareva, 1976^{c g}
- Rhithrogena brunneotincta McDunnough, 1933^{i c g b}
- Rhithrogena bulgarica Braasch, Soldán & Sowa, 1985^{c g}
- Rhithrogena buresi Sowa, 1973^{c g}
- Rhithrogena carpatoalpina Klonowska, Olechowska, Sartori & Weichselbaumer, 1987^{c g}
- Rhithrogena castellana Navás, 1927^{c g}
- Rhithrogena catalaunica Navas, 1916^{g}
- Rhithrogena caucasica Braasch, 1979^{c g}
- Rhithrogena cincta Navás, 1921^{c g}
- Rhithrogena circumtatrica Sowa & Soldán, 1986^{c g}
- Rhithrogena colmarsensis Sowa, 1984^{c g}
- Rhithrogena corcontica Sowa & Soldán, 1986^{c g}
- Rhithrogena dagestanica Braasch, 1979^{c g}
- Rhithrogena daterrai Sowa, 1984^{c g}
- Rhithrogena decolorata Sinitshenkova, 1973^{c g}
- Rhithrogena decora Day, 1954^{i c g}
- Rhithrogena degrangei Sowa, 1969^{c g}
- Rhithrogena delphinensis Sowa & Degrange, 1987^{c g}
- Rhithrogena diaphana Navás, 1917^{c g}
- Rhithrogena diensis Sowa & Degrange, 1987^{c g}
- Rhithrogena dorieri Sowa, 1971^{c g}
- Rhithrogena eatoni Esben-Petersen, 1912^{c g}
- Rhithrogena endenensis Metzler, Tomka & Zurwerra, 1985^{c g}
- Rhithrogena eugeniae Kluge, 1983^{c g}
- Rhithrogena excisa Sinitshenkova, 1979^{c g}
- Rhithrogena exilis Traver, 1933^{i c g}
- Rhithrogena expectata Braasch, 1979^{c g}
- Rhithrogena fasciata Traver, 1933^{i c g}
- Rhithrogena ferruginea Navás, 1905^{c g}
- Rhithrogena fiorii Grandi, 1953^{c g}
- Rhithrogena flavianula (McDunnough, 1924)^{i c g b}
- Rhithrogena fonticola Sowa & Degrange, 1987^{c g}
- Rhithrogena fuscifrons Traver, 1933^{i c g}
- Rhithrogena futilis McDunnough, 1934^{i c g}
- Rhithrogena gaspeensis McDunnough, 1933^{i c g}
- Rhithrogena germanica Eaton, 1885^{c g}
- Rhithrogena giudicelliorum Thomas & Bouzidi, 1986^{c g}
- Rhithrogena goeldlini Sartori & Sowa, 1988^{c g}
- Rhithrogena gorganica Klapálek, 1907^{c g}
- Rhithrogena gorrizi Navás, 1913^{c g}
- Rhithrogena gratianopolitana Sowa, Degrange & Sartori, 1986^{c g}
- Rhithrogena grischuna Sartori & Oswald, 1988^{c g}
- Rhithrogena hageni Eaton, 1885^{i c g}
- Rhithrogena henschi Klapálek, 1906^{c g}
- Rhithrogena hercegovina Tanasijevic, 1984^{c g}
- Rhithrogena hercynia Landa, 1970^{c g}
- Rhithrogena hybrida Eaton, 1885^{c g}
- Rhithrogena impersonata (McDunnough, 1925)^{i c g b}
- Rhithrogena ingalik Randolph and McCafferty, 2005^{i c g}
- Rhithrogena insularis Esben-Petersen, 1913^{c g}
- Rhithrogena iranica Braasch, 1983^{c g}
- Rhithrogena iridina (Kolenati, 1859)^{c g}
- Rhithrogena jacobi Braasch & Soldán, 1988^{c g}
- Rhithrogena jahorinensis Tanasijevic, 1985^{c g}
- Rhithrogena japonica Uéno, 1928^{c g}
- Rhithrogena jejuna Eaton, 1885^{i c g}
- Rhithrogena johanni Belfiore, 1990^{c g}
- Rhithrogena joostiana Sowa, 1976^{c g}
- Rhithrogena kashmiriensis (Braasch & Soldán, 1982)^{c g}
- Rhithrogena kimminsi Thomas, 1970^{c g}
- Rhithrogena klausnitzeriana Braasch, 1979^{c g}
- Rhithrogena klugei Tiunova, 2010^{c g}
- Rhithrogena laciniosa Sinitshenkova, 1979^{c g}
- Rhithrogena landai Sowa & Soldán, 1984^{c g}
- Rhithrogena lepnevae Brodsky, 1930^{c g}
- Rhithrogena lisettae Bauernfeind, 2003^{c g}
- Rhithrogena loyolaea Navás, 1922^{c g}
- Rhithrogena lucida Braasch, 1979^{c g}
- Rhithrogena manifesta Eaton, 1885^{i c g}
- Rhithrogena marcosi Alba-Tercedor & Sowa, 1987^{c g}
- Rhithrogena mariae Vitte, 1991^{c g}
- Rhithrogena mariaedominicae Sowa & Degrange, 1987^{c g}
- Rhithrogena marinkovici Tanasijevic, 1985^{c g}
- Rhithrogena minazuki Imanishi, 1936^{c g}
- Rhithrogena minima Sinitshenkova, 1973^{c g}
- Rhithrogena monserrati Alba-Tercedor & Sowa, 1986^{c g}
- Rhithrogena morrisoni (Banks, 1924)^{i c g}
- Rhithrogena nepalensis Braasch, 1984^{c g}
- Rhithrogena neretvana Tanasijevic, 1984^{c g}
- Rhithrogena nivata (Eaton, 1871)^{c g}
- Rhithrogena notialis Allen and Cohen, 1977^{i c g}
- Rhithrogena nuragica Belfiore, 1987^{c g}
- Rhithrogena orientalis You, 1990^{c g}
- Rhithrogena ornata (Ulmer, 1939)^{c g}
- Rhithrogena oscensis Navás, 1927^{c g}
- Rhithrogena ourika Thomas & Mohati, 1985^{c g}
- Rhithrogena parva (Ulmer, 1912)^{c g}
- Rhithrogena paulinae Sartori & Sowa, 1992^{c g}
- Rhithrogena picteti Sowa, 1971^{c g}
- Rhithrogena piechockii Braasch, 1977^{c g}
- Rhithrogena plana Allen and Chao, 1978^{i c g}
- Rhithrogena podhalensis Sowa & Soldán, 1986^{c g}
- Rhithrogena pontica Sowa, Soldán, Kazanci & Braasch, 1986^{c g}
- Rhithrogena potamalis Braasch, 1979^{c g}
- Rhithrogena puthzi Sowa, 1984^{c g}
- Rhithrogena puytoraci Sowa & Degrange, 1987^{c g}
- Rhithrogena reatina Sowa & Belfiore, 1984^{c g}
- Rhithrogena robusta Dodds, 1923^{i c g}
- Rhithrogena rolandi Weichselbaumer, 1995^{c g}
- Rhithrogena rubicunda Traver, 1937^{i c g}
- Rhithrogena ryszardi Thomas, 1987^{c g}
- Rhithrogena sartorii Zrelli & Boumaiza, 2011^{c g}
- Rhithrogena savoiensis Alba-Tercedor & Sowa, 1987^{c g}
- Rhithrogena semicolorata (Curtis, 1834)^{c g}
- Rhithrogena siamensis Braasch & Boonsoong, 2009^{c g}
- Rhithrogena sibillina Metzler, Tomka & Zurwerra, 1985^{c g}
- Rhithrogena sibirica Brodsky, 1930^{c g}
- Rhithrogena siciliana Braasch, 1989^{c g}
- Rhithrogena soteria Navás, 1917^{c g}
- Rhithrogena sowai Puthz, 1972^{c g}
- Rhithrogena stackelbergi Sinitshenkova, 1973^{c g}
- Rhithrogena strenua Thomas, 1982^{c g}
- Rhithrogena subangulata Braasch, 1984^{c g}
- Rhithrogena sublineata Kazanci & Braasch, 1988^{c g}
- Rhithrogena tateyamana Imanishi, 1936^{c g}
- Rhithrogena taurisca Bauernfeind, 1992^{c g}
- Rhithrogena teberdensis Zimmermann, 1977^{c g}
- Rhithrogena tetrapunctigera Matsumura, 1931^{c g}
- Rhithrogena theischingeri Braasch, 1981^{c g}
- Rhithrogena thomasi Alba-Tercedor & Sowa, 1986^{c g}
- Rhithrogena thracica Sowa, Soldán & Braasch, 1988^{c g}
- Rhithrogena tianshanica Brodsky, 1930^{c g}
- Rhithrogena tibialis (Ulmer, 1920)^{c}
- Rhithrogena trispina Zhou & Zheng, 2000^{c g}
- Rhithrogena uhari Traver, 1933^{i c g}
- Rhithrogena umbrosa Braasch, 1979^{c g}
- Rhithrogena undulata (Banks, 1924)^{i c g}
- Rhithrogena unica Zhou & Peters, 2004^{c g}
- Rhithrogena uzbekistanicus (Braasch & Soldán, 1982)^{c g}
- Rhithrogena vaillanti Sowa & Degrange, 1987^{c g}
- Rhithrogena virilis McDunnough, 1934^{i c g}
- Rhithrogena wolosatkae Klonowska, 1987^{c g}
- Rhithrogena wuyiensis (Gui, Zhou & Su, 1999)^{c g}
- Rhithrogena zelinkai Sowa & Soldán, 1984^{c g}
- Rhithrogena zernyi Bauernfeind, 1991^{c g}
- Rhithrogena zhiltzovae Sinitshenkova, 1979^{c g}
- Rhithrogena znojkoi (Tshernova, 1938)^{c g}

Data sources: i = ITIS, c = Catalogue of Life, g = GBIF, b = Bugguide.net
