= Petrobius canadensis =

Scientific classification
- Kingdom: Animalia
- Phylum: Arthropoda
- Clade: Pancrustacea
- Class: Insecta
- Order: Archaeognatha
- Family: Machilidae
- Genus: Petrobius
- Species: P. canadensis

Binomial name
- Petrobius canadensis Paclt, 1969

Species of archaeognatha

Petrobius canadensis is a species in the genus Petrobius of the family Machilidae which belongs to the insect order Archaeognatha (jumping bristletails).
