= Petrobius adriaticus =

Scientific classification
- Kingdom: Animalia
- Phylum: Arthropoda
- Clade: Pancrustacea
- Class: Insecta
- Order: Archaeognatha
- Family: Machilidae
- Genus: Petrobius
- Species: P. adriaticus

Binomial name
- Petrobius adriaticus Verhoeff, 1910

Species of jumping bristletail

Petrobius adriaticus is a species of jumping bristletail in the family Machilidae.
