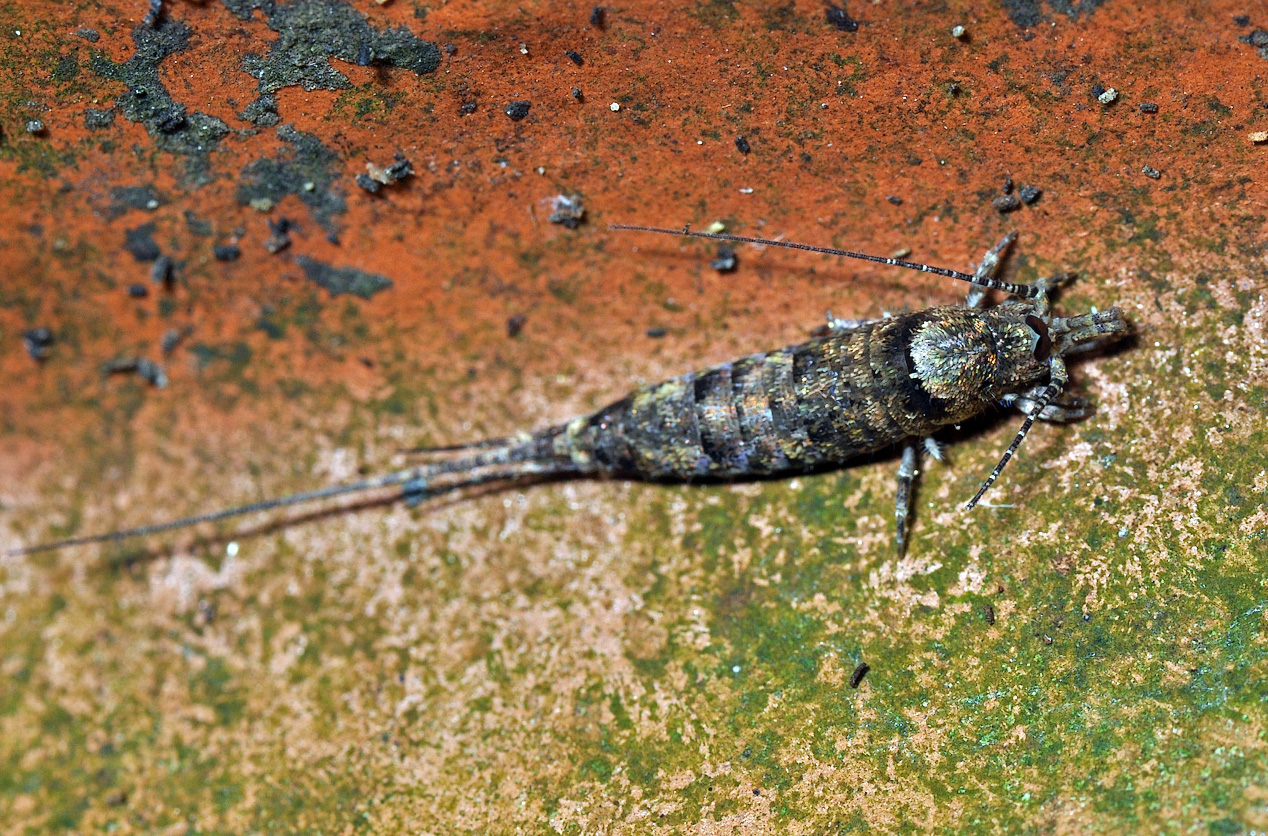
- Trigoniophthalmus alternatus

Scientific classification
- Kingdom: Animalia
- Phylum: Arthropoda
- Clade: Pancrustacea
- Class: Insecta
- Order: Archaeognatha
- Family: Machilidae
- Subfamily: Machilinae
- Genus: Trigoniophthalmus; Verhoeff, 1910

= Trigoniophthalmus =

Genus of jumping bristletails

Trigoniophthalmus is a genus of jumping bristletails in the family of Machilidae. There are about 11 described species under Trigoniophthalmus.

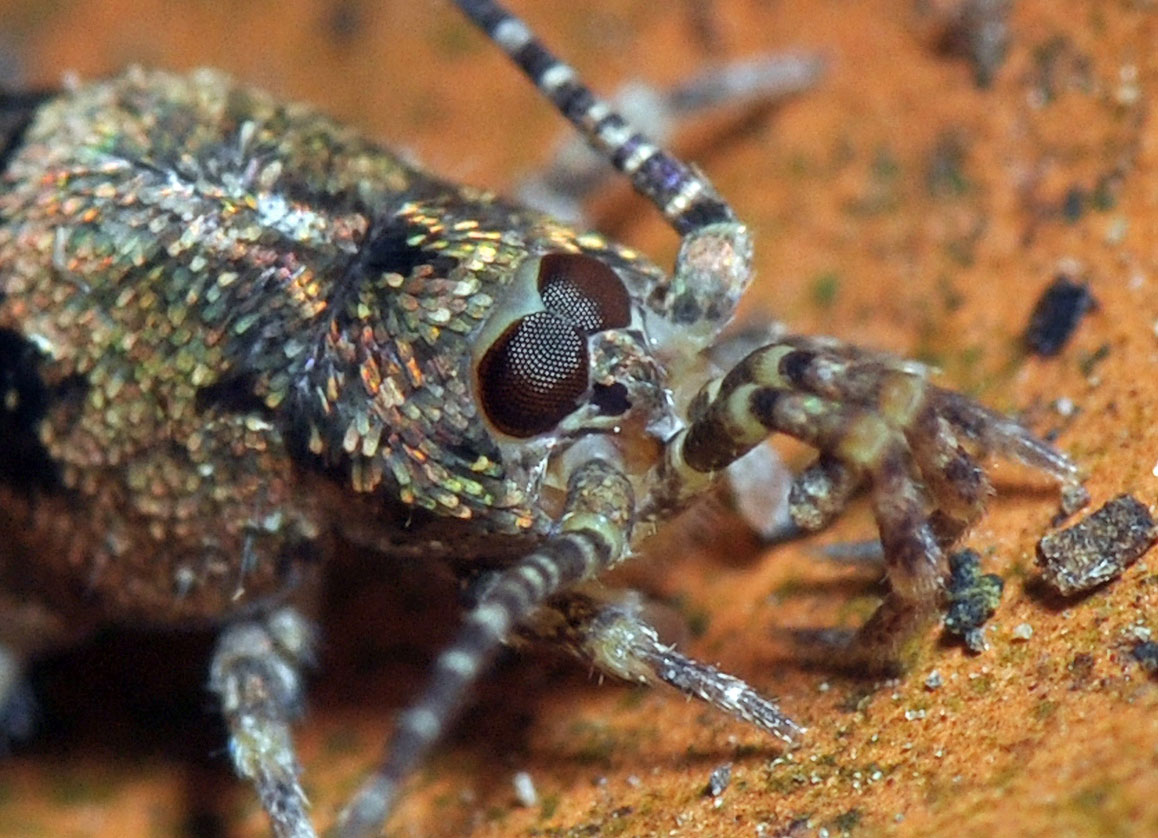
Trigoniophthalmus alternatus

== Species ==
These 11 species belong to the genus Trigoniophthalmus:

- Trigoniophthalmus alternatus (Silvestri, 1904)
- Trigoniophthalmus banaticus Verhoeff, 1910
- Trigoniophthalmus borgesi Mendes, Gaju, Bach & Molero, 2000
- Trigoniophthalmus csikii (Stach, 1922)
- Trigoniophthalmus equinus Wygodzinsky, 1958
- Trigoniophthalmus graecanicus Wygodzinsky, 1958
- Trigoniophthalmus hussoni Wygodzinsky, 1958
- Trigoniophthalmus imitator Wygodzinsky, 1958
- Trigoniophthalmus kobani Kaplin, 2019
- Trigoniophthalmus mimus Wygodzinsky, 1958
- Trigoniophthalmus remyi Wygodzinsky, 1958
- Trigoniophthalmus tseyi Kaplin, 2019
- Trigoniophthalmus ukrainensis Kaplin & Vargovitsh, 2020
- Trigoniophthalmus wygodzinskyi Stach, 1958
