= Petrobius crimeus =

Scientific classification
- Kingdom: Animalia
- Phylum: Arthropoda
- Clade: Pancrustacea
- Class: Insecta
- Order: Archaeognatha
- Family: Machilidae
- Genus: Petrobius
- Species: P. crimeus

Binomial name
- Petrobius crimeus Kaplin, 1983

Species of jumping bristletail

Petrobius crimeus is a species of jumping bristletail in the family Machilidae.
