= Rhithrogena brunneotincta =

Scientific classification
- Domain: Eukaryota
- Kingdom: Animalia
- Phylum: Arthropoda
- Class: Insecta
- Order: Ephemeroptera
- Family: Heptageniidae
- Genus: Rhithrogena
- Species: R. brunneotincta

Binomial name
- Rhithrogena brunneotincta McDunnough, 1933

Species of mayfly

Rhithrogena brunneotincta is a species of flatheaded mayfly in the family Heptageniidae. It is found in North America.
