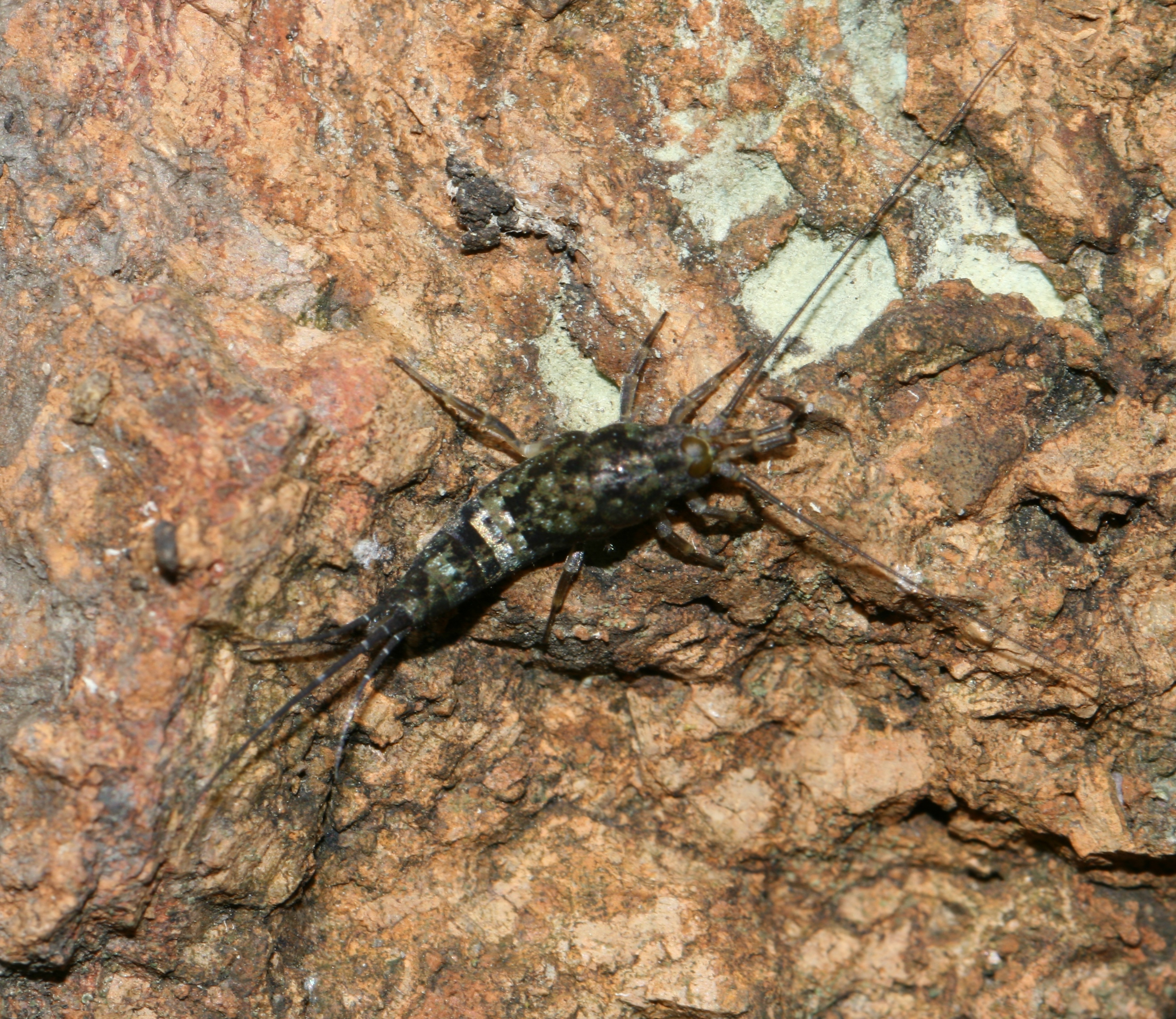
- Petrobius brevistylis

Scientific classification
- Kingdom: Animalia
- Phylum: Arthropoda
- Clade: Pancrustacea
- Class: Insecta
- Order: Archaeognatha
- Family: Machilidae
- Genus: Petrobius
- Species: P. brevistylis

Binomial name
- Petrobius brevistylis Carpenter, 1913

= Petrobius brevistylis =

Species of jumping bristletail

Petrobius brevistylis is a species of jumping bristletail in the family Machilidae. It is found in Europe and Northern Asia (excluding China) and North America.

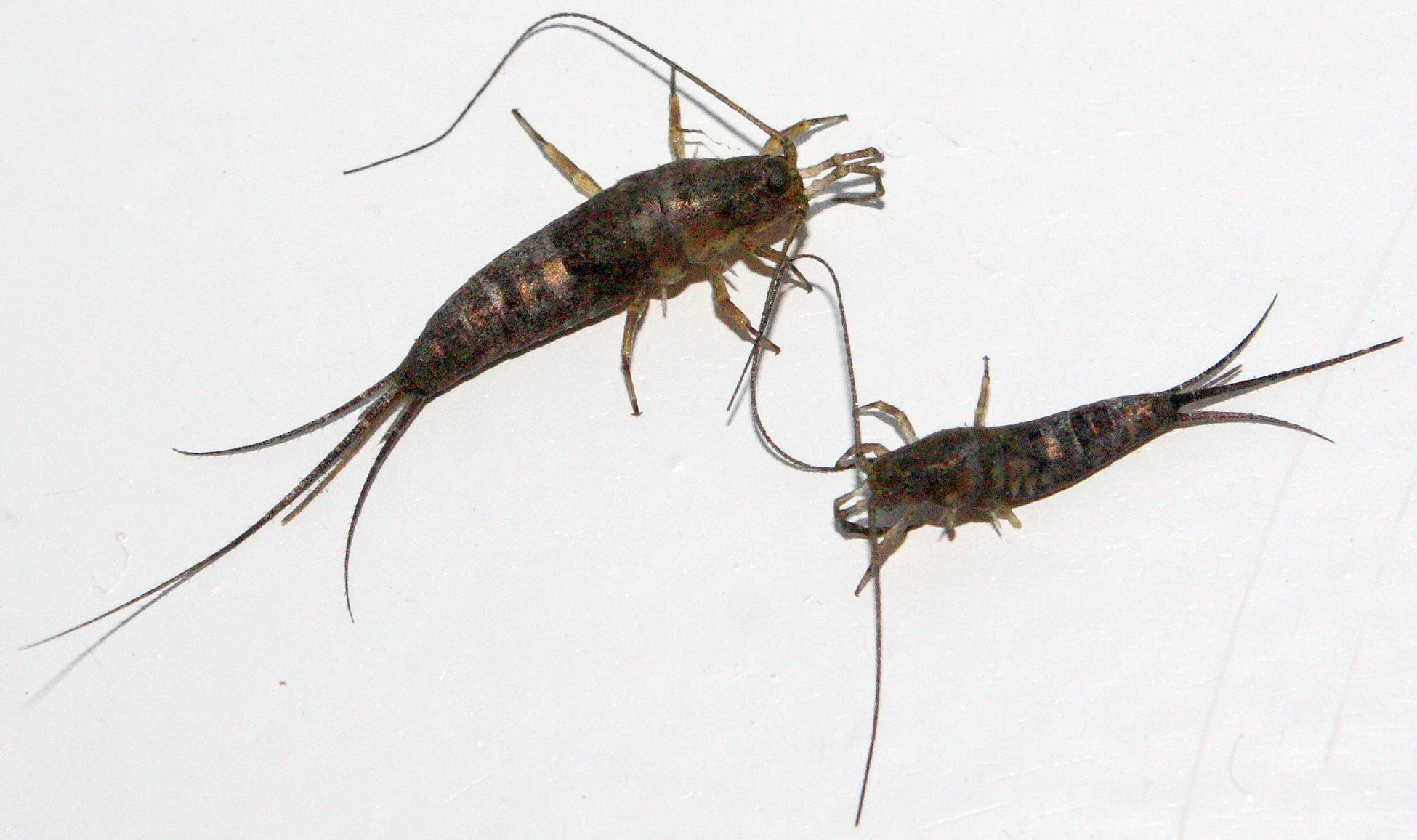
Petrobius brevistylis

== Distribution and habitat ==
=== Native range ===
The species is native to rocky coastal areas of Europe and northern Asia (excluding China), particularly along the coasts of the British Isles, Scandinavia, and Iceland.

=== Introduced range ===
P. brevistylis has been introduced to the northeastern coast of North America, from Newfoundland to Rhode Island, likely through ballast material on ships.

=== Habitat ===
It typically inhabits the supralittoral zone, just above the high tide line, living among cracks in rocks, breakwaters, and harbor walls. It prefers shaded, moist environments where algae and lichens are present.

== Behavior and ecology ==
This insect is nocturnal, hiding in rock crevices during the day and emerging at night to feed on algae, lichens, and detritus. Reproduction occurs in rock crevices, and juveniles undergo gradual development.

Adults may live for up to three years. Some bristletail species exhibit parthenogenesis, although this has not been definitively confirmed for P. brevistylis.

== Genetics ==
The mitochondrial genome of Petrobius brevistylis is approximately 15,698 base pairs long. It has been sequenced for phylogenetic and evolutionary studies.

== Conservation ==
There are no specific conservation measures or listings for P. brevistylis. The species appears stable, although shoreline modification could affect its habitat.

== Significance ==
Petrobius brevistylis is a member of one of the most primitive insect lineages and is used in studies of early insect evolution. Its presence on both sides of the Atlantic also makes it a subject of interest in research on marine and littoral dispersal.
