= Imago =

Last stage in an insect's metamorphosis

Last molting of a cicada giving rise to the winged imago

In biology, the imago (Latin for "image") is the last stage an insect attains during its metamorphosis, its process of growth and development; it is also called the imaginal stage ("imaginal" being "imago" in adjective form), the stage in which the insect attains maturity. It follows the final ecdysis of the immature instars.

In a member of the Ametabola or Hemimetabola, species in which metamorphosis is "incomplete", the final ecdysis follows the last immature or nymphal stage. In members of the Holometabola, in which there is a pupal stage, the final ecdysis follows emergence from the pupa, after which the metamorphosis is complete, although there is a prolonged period of maturation in some species.

The imago is the only stage during which the insect is sexually mature and, if it is a winged species, the only stage that has functional wings. The imago often is referred to as the adult stage.

Members of the order Ephemeroptera (mayflies) do not have a pupal stage, but they briefly pass through an intermediate winged stage called the subimago. Insects at this stage have functional wings but are not yet sexually mature.

The Latin plural of imago is imagines, and this is the term generally used by entomologists when a plural form is required –however, imagoes is also acceptable.

== See also ==
- Imaginal disc
