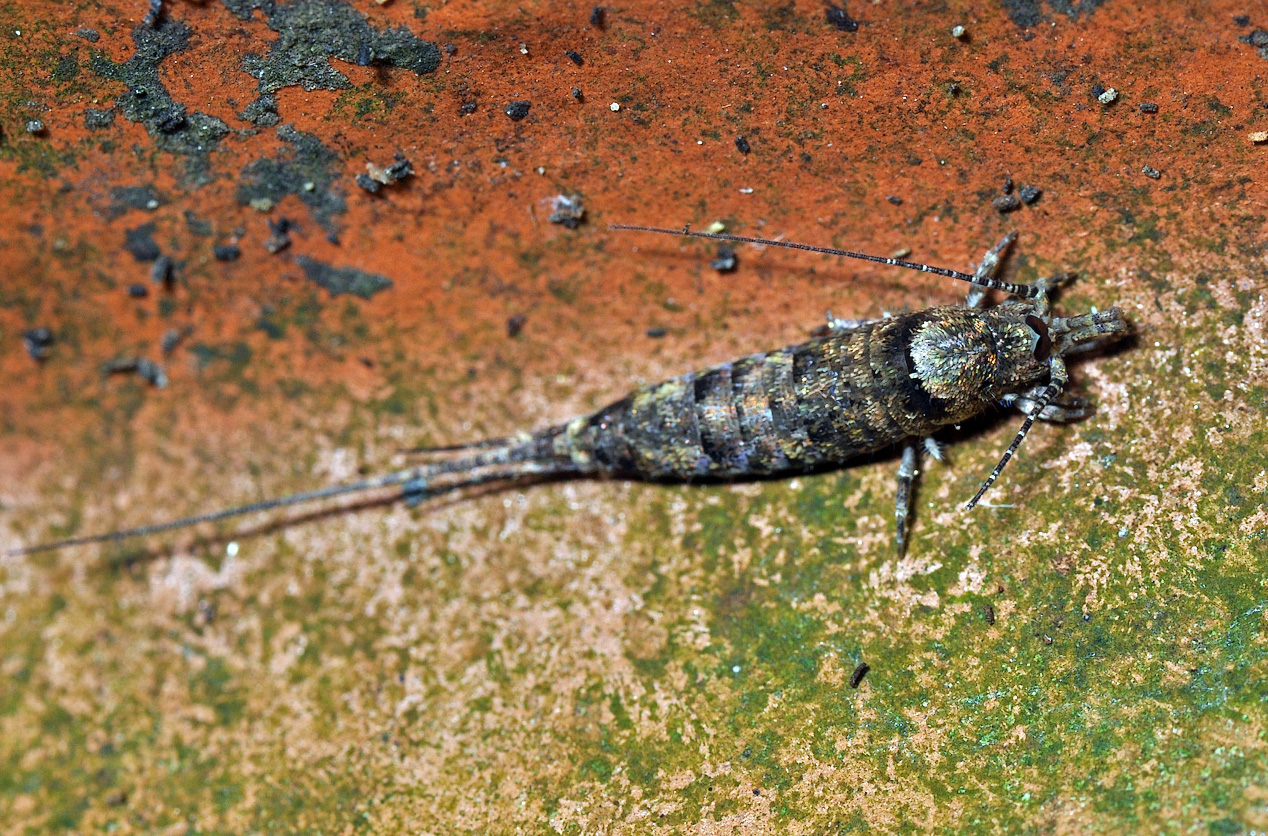

Scientific classification
- Kingdom: Animalia
- Phylum: Arthropoda
- Clade: Pancrustacea
- Class: Insecta
- Order: Archaeognatha
- Family: Machilidae
- Genus: Trigoniophthalmus
- Species: T. alternatus

Binomial name
- Trigoniophthalmus alternatus (Silvestri, 1904)

= Trigoniophthalmus alternatus =

Species of jumping bristletail

Trigoniophthalmus alternatus is a species of jumping bristletail in the family Machilidae. It is found in Europe and Northern Asia (excluding China) and North America.

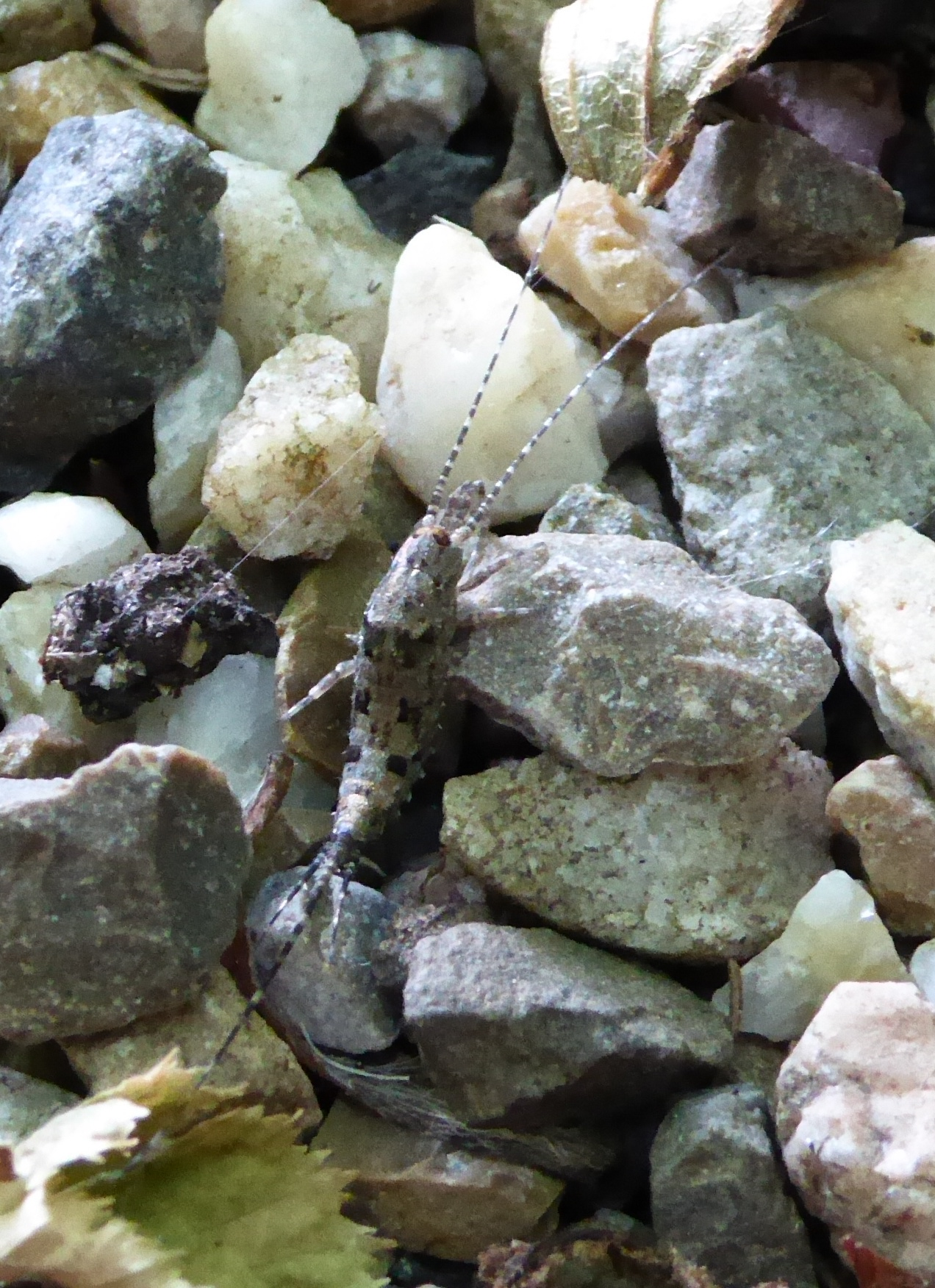

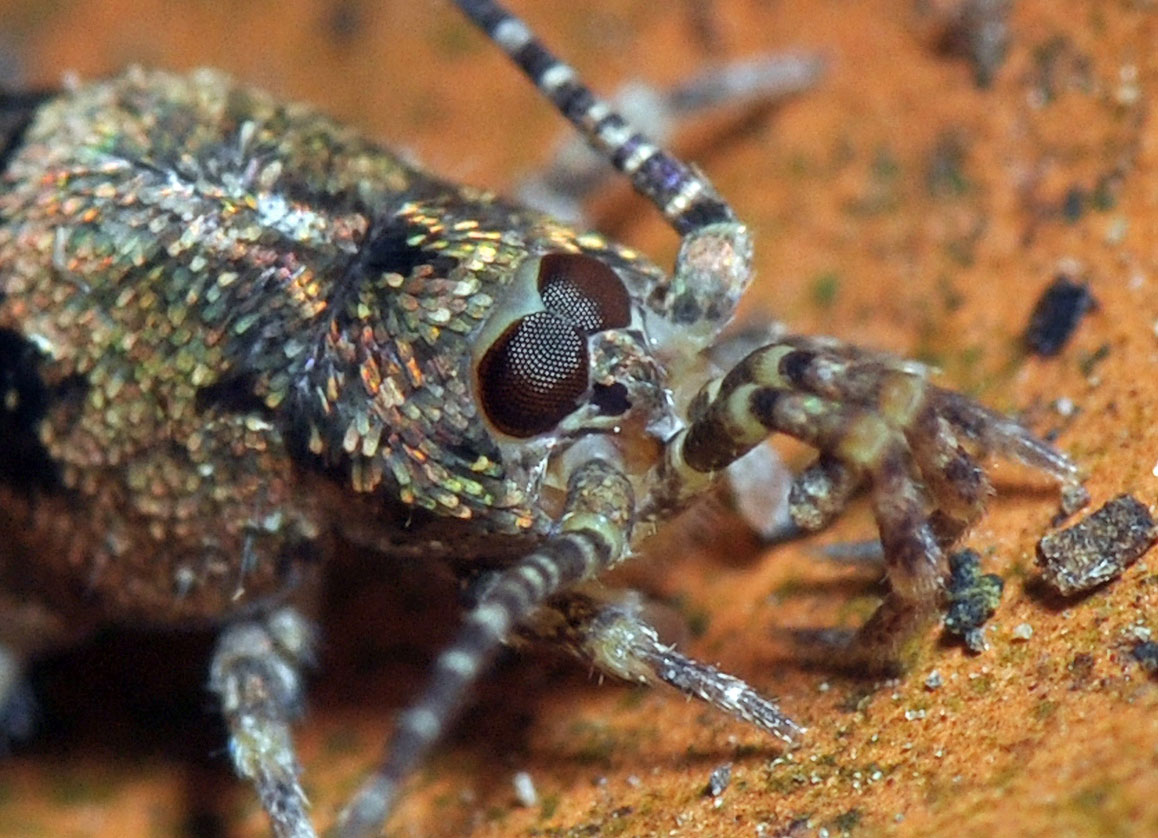
