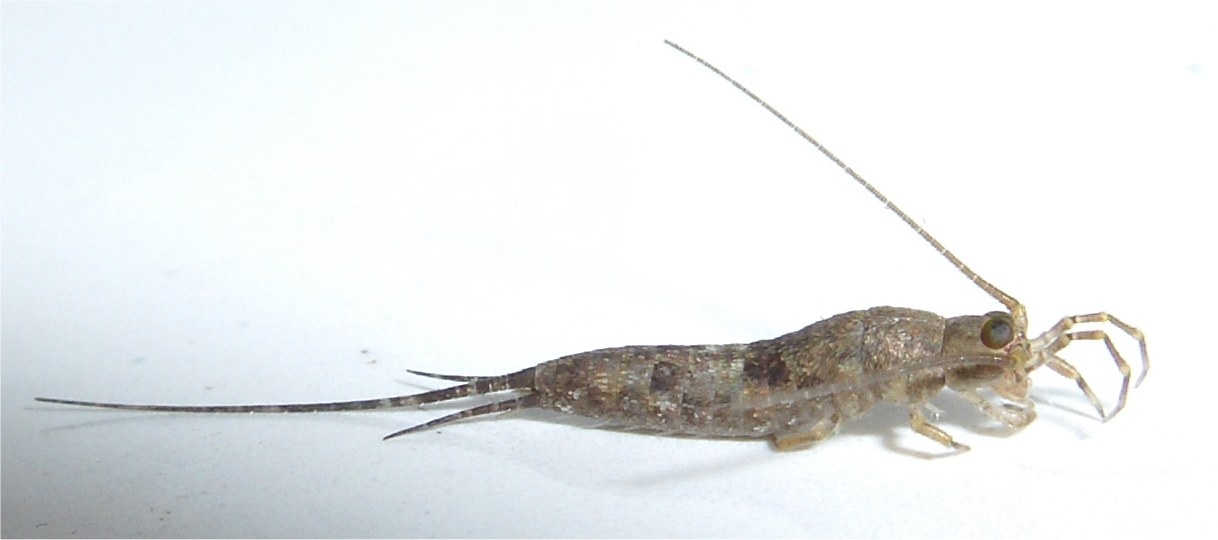

Scientific classification
- Kingdom: Animalia
- Phylum: Arthropoda
- Clade: Pancrustacea
- Class: Insecta
- Order: Archaeognatha
- Family: Machilidae
- Genus: Petrobius
- Species: P. maritimus

Binomial name
- Petrobius maritimus (Leach, 1809)

Synonyms
- Petrobius maritimus Leach, 1809; Petromachilis longicornis Reilly, 1915

= Petrobius maritimus =

Species of jumping bristletail

Petrobius maritimus, the shore bristletail or sea bristletail, is a species of Archaeognatha found on rocky shores from the Mediterranean Sea to the North Sea .

Individuals may grow up to 15 mm and are grey in colour, with long bristly antennae and a triple forked tail .

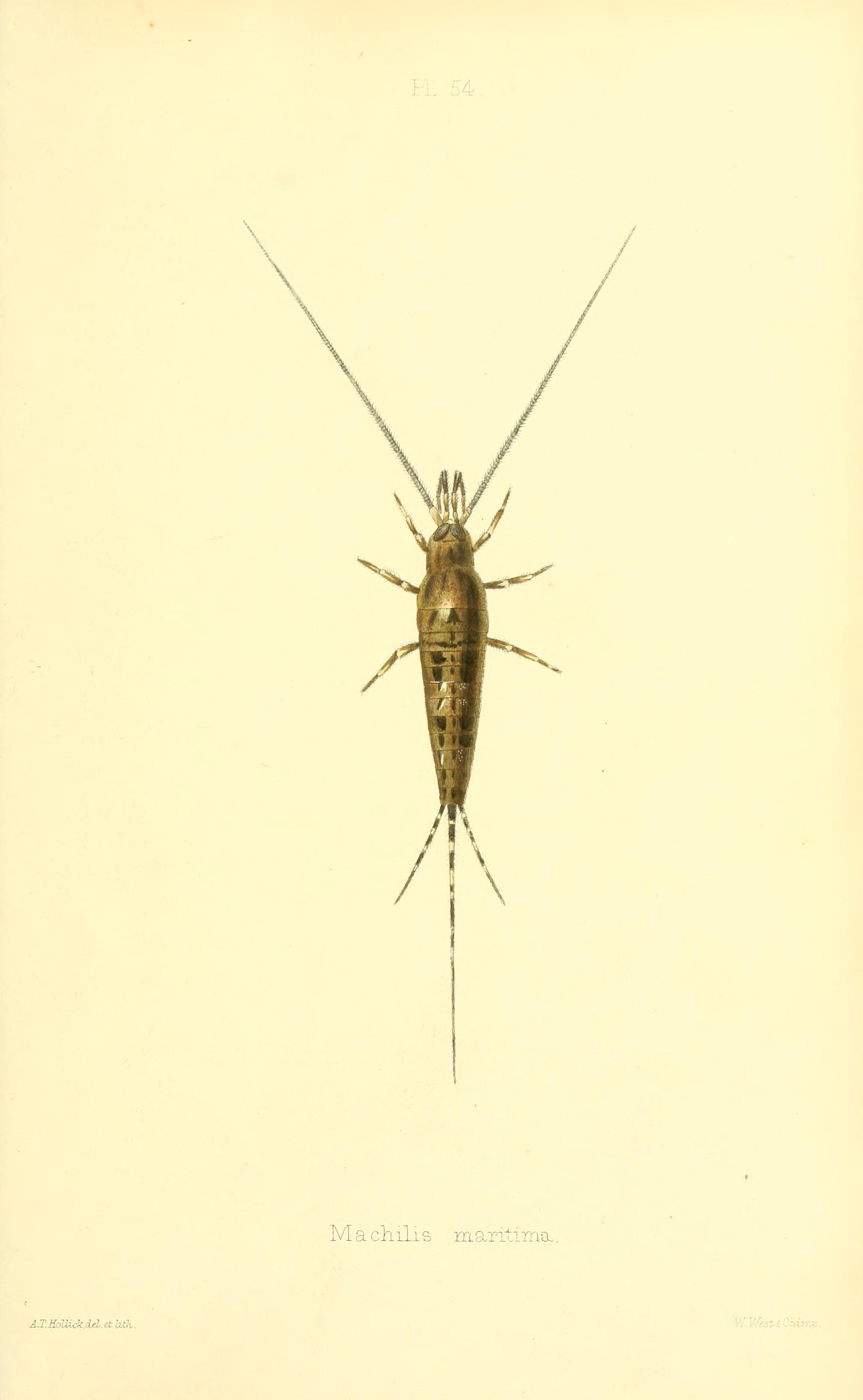
Illustration of P. maritimus.

They are very resistant to low temperatures, and remains active even if the temperature drops below 0 degrees C.
