= Zangheri =

Zangheri is an Italian surname. Notable people with the surname include:

- Cornelia Zangheri Bandi (1664–1731), Italian noblewoman
- Renato Zangheri (1925–2015), Italian politician

== See also ==
- Machilis zangheri, species of jumping bristletail
