= Machilis feminoides =

Scientific classification
- Kingdom: Animalia
- Phylum: Arthropoda
- Clade: Pancrustacea
- Class: Insecta
- Order: Archaeognatha
- Family: Machilidae
- Genus: Machilis
- Species: M. feminoides

Binomial name
- Machilis feminoides Wygodzinsky, 1941

Species of archaeognatha

Machilis feminoides is a species in the genus Machilis of the family Machilidae which belongs to the insect order Archaeognatha (jumping bristletails)
