= Machilis cotianus =

Scientific classification
- Kingdom: Animalia
- Phylum: Arthropoda
- Clade: Pancrustacea
- Class: Insecta
- Order: Archaeognatha
- Family: Machilidae
- Genus: Machilis
- Species: M. cotianus

Binomial name
- Machilis cotianus Bach, 1982

Species of archaeognatha

Machilis cotianus is a species of jumping bristletail (order Archaeognatha) in the family Machilidae. It is known from Italy.
