= Machilis shiobarensis =

Scientific classification
- Kingdom: Animalia
- Phylum: Arthropoda
- Clade: Pancrustacea
- Class: Insecta
- Order: Archaeognatha
- Family: Machilidae
- Genus: Machilis
- Species: †M. shiobarensis

Binomial name
- †Machilis shiobarensis Naora, 1933

Species of archaeognatha

Machilis shiobarensis is an extinct species in the genus Machilis of the family Machilidae which belongs to the insect order Archaeognatha (jumping bristletails).
