= Machilis dumitrescui =

Scientific classification
- Kingdom: Animalia
- Phylum: Arthropoda
- Clade: Pancrustacea
- Class: Insecta
- Order: Archaeognatha
- Family: Machilidae
- Genus: Machilis
- Species: M. dumitrescui

Binomial name
- Machilis dumitrescui Hollinger, 1972

Species of archaeognatha

Machilis dumitrescui is a species in the genus Machilis of the family Machilidae which belongs to the insect order Archaeognatha (jumping bristletails)
