= Machilis germanica =

Scientific classification
- Kingdom: Animalia
- Phylum: Arthropoda
- Clade: Pancrustacea
- Class: Insecta
- Order: Archaeognatha
- Family: Machilidae
- Genus: Machilis
- Species: M. germanica

Binomial name
- Machilis germanica Janetschek, 1953

Synonyms
- Machilis meijerei

Species of archaeognatha

Machilis germanica is a species in the genus Machilis of the family Machilidae which belongs to the insect order Archaeognatha (jumping bristletails).
