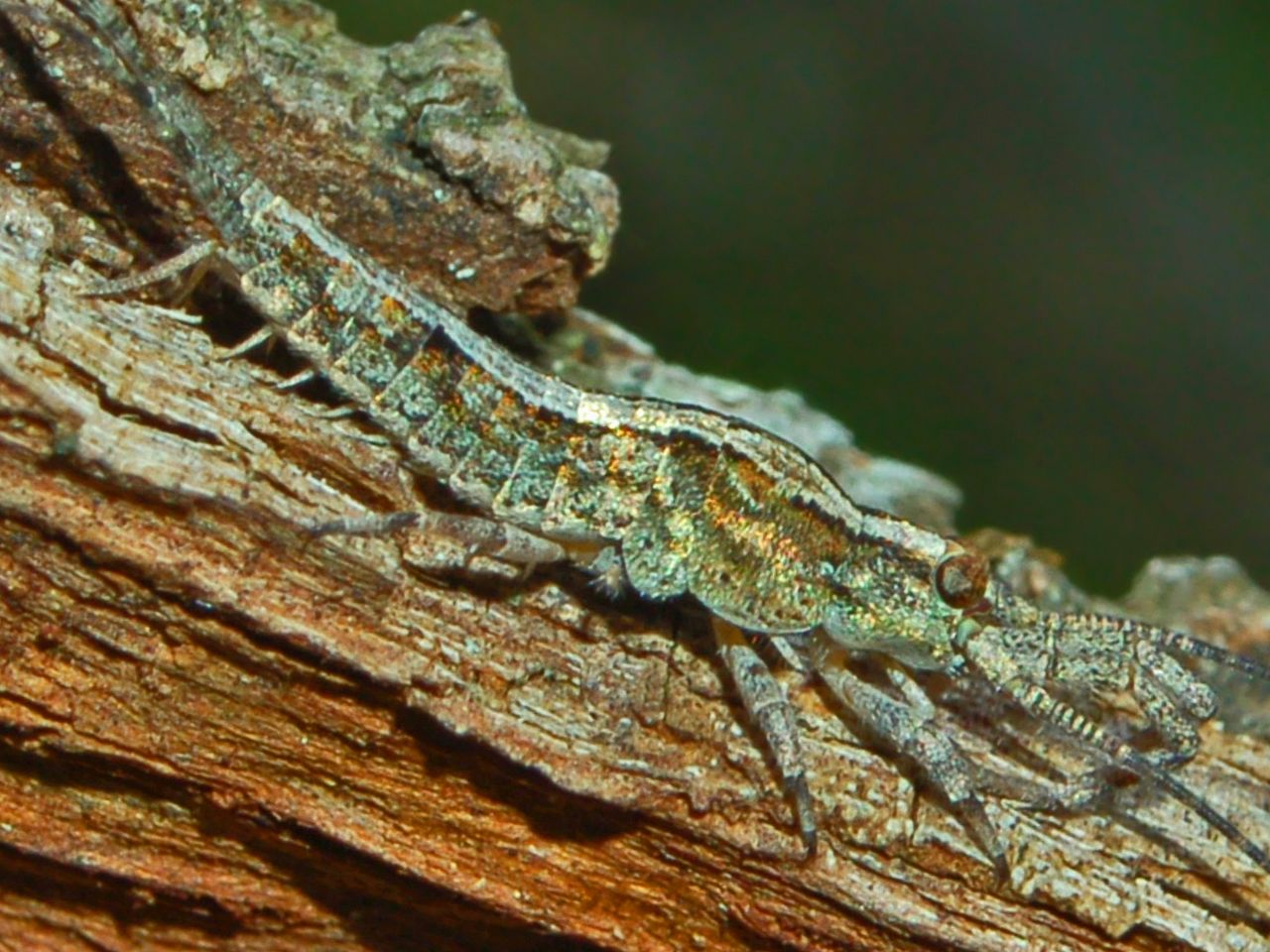
- Machilis species

Scientific classification
- Kingdom: Animalia
- Phylum: Arthropoda
- Clade: Pancrustacea
- Class: Insecta
- Order: Archaeognatha
- Family: Machilidae
- Genus: Machilis; Latreille, 1832

= Machilis =

Genus of jumping bristletails

Machilis is a genus of jumping bristletails in the family Machilidae.

== Species ==
Species within this genus include:

- Machilis aciliata
- Machilis africanus
- Machilis albifrons
- Machilis aleamaculata
- Machilis alpicola
- Machilis alpina
- Machilis alternata
- Machilis annulicornis
- Machilis appendiculata
- Machilis arctica
- Machilis aurantiacus
- Machilis australis
- Machilis avreus
- Machilis blascoi
- Machilis bokori
- Machilis bouvieri
- Machilis brevicornis
- Machilis burgundiae
- Machilis caestifera
- Machilis capusei
- Machilis chisonensis
- Machilis conjuncta
- Machilis conospinifera
- Machilis constricta
- Machilis corsica
- Machilis cotianus
- Machilis denisae
- Machilis distincta
- Machilis dolichopsis
- Machilis dragani
- Machilis dudichi
- Machilis dumitrescui
- Machilis engiadina
- Machilis eremita
- Machilis feminoides
- Machilis fernandesi
- Machilis finitima
- Machilis friderici
- Machilis fuscistylis
- Machilis gardinii
- Machilis germanica
- Machilis glacialis
- Machilis grandipalpus
- Machilis grassii
- Machilis gravis
- Machilis guadarramae
- Machilis handschini
- Machilis haroi
- Machilis hauseri
- Machilis helleri
- Machilis helvetica
- Machilis heteropus
- Machilis hrabei
- Machilis huetheri
- Machilis inermis
- Machilis ingens
- Machilis jurassica
- Machilis ladensis
- Machilis lehnhoferi
- Machilis lepontica
- Machilis lindbergi
- Machilis longipalpus
- Machilis longiseta
- Machilis lusitana
- Machilis macedonica
- Machilis maculata
- Machilis maritima
- Machilis massanei
- Machilis meijerei
- Machilis melanarthra
- Machilis mesolcinensis
- Machilis montana
- Machilis monticola
- Machilis multispinosa
- Machilis mutica
- Machilis nigrifrons
- Machilis nipponica
- Machilis nivicomes
- Machilis noctis
- Machilis noveli
- Machilis obliterata
- Machilis obscura
- Machilis orbitalis
- Machilis oudemansi
- Machilis pallida
- Machilis pasubiensis
- Machilis pedemontanus
- Machilis peralensis
- Machilis perkinsi
- Machilis pluriannulata
- Machilis poenina
- Machilis provencalis
- Machilis pulchra
- Machilis pyknopalpa
- Machilis pyrenaica
- Machilis robusta
- Machilis rubrofusca
- Machilis sacarroi
- Machilis sacra
- Machilis saltatrix
- Machilis sardous
- Machilis scoparia
- †Machilis shiobarensis
- Machilis silvestrii
- Machilis simplex
- Machilis socarroi
- Machilis spinosissima
- Machilis stachi
- Machilis steinbocki
- Machilis stolli
- Machilis strebeli
- Machilis sutteri
- Machilis tenuis
- Machilis ticinensis
- Machilis tuberculata
- Machilis vagans
- Machilis vallicola
- Machilis variabilis
- Machilis vicina
- Machilis winchkleri
- Machilis zangheri
