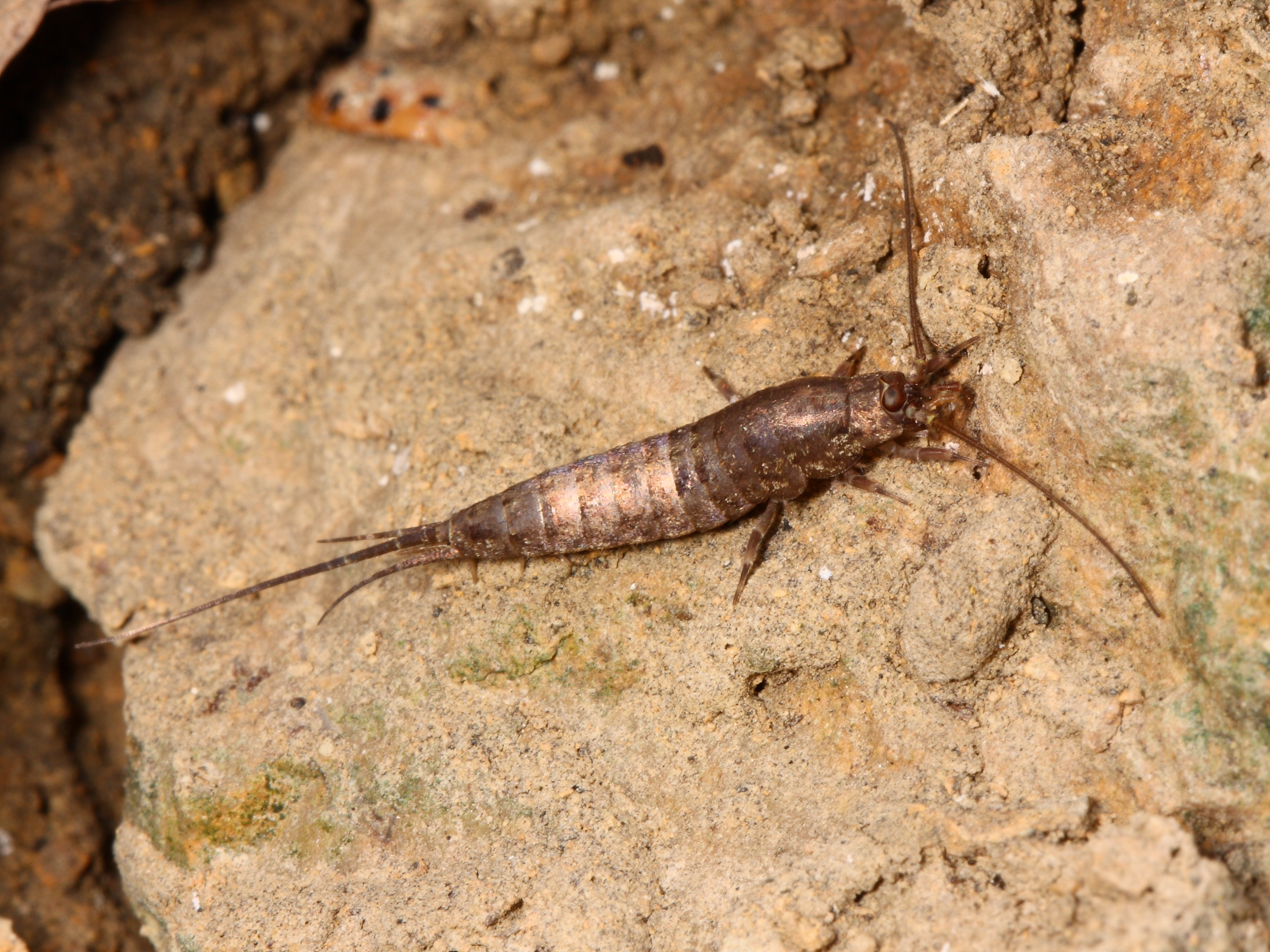

Scientific classification
- Kingdom: Animalia
- Phylum: Arthropoda
- Clade: Pancrustacea
- Class: Insecta
- Order: Archaeognatha
- Family: Meinertellidae
- Genus: Machilinus
- Species: M. aurantiacus

Binomial name
- Machilinus aurantiacus (Schött, 1897)

Synonyms
- Machilis aurantiacus Schött, 1896; Machilinus nevadensis Sweetman, 1937

= Machilinus aurantiacus =

Species of jumping bristletail

Machilinus aurantiacus is a species of rock bristletail in the family Meinertellidae. It is found in North America. Adults are 6-8 mm in length and covered in silvery scales. Legs are yellow-brown. This species is diurnally active.

== Subspecies ==
These two subspecies belong to the species Machilinus aurantiacus:

- Machilinus aurantiacus aurantiacus (Schött, 1897)
- Machilinus aurantiacus setosus Sturm & Bach, 1992
