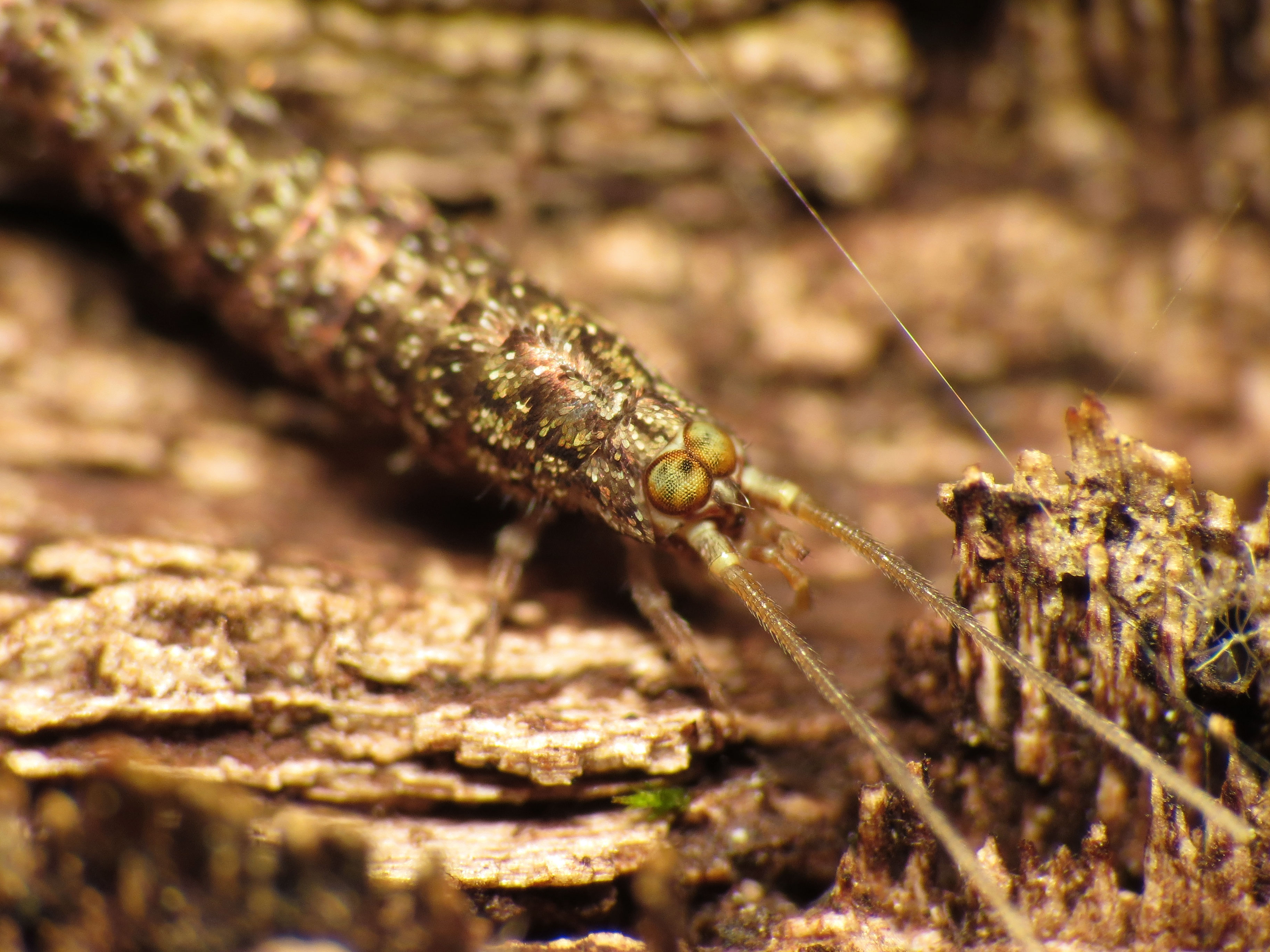

Scientific classification
- Kingdom: Animalia
- Phylum: Arthropoda
- Clade: Pancrustacea
- Class: Insecta
- Order: Archaeognatha
- Family: Meinertellidae
- Genus: Machiloides
- Species: M. banksi

Binomial name
- Machiloides banksi Silvestri, 1911

= Machiloides banksi =

Species of jumping bristletail

Machiloides banksi is a species of rock bristletail from the eastern United States, in a family of basal insects belonging to the order Archaeognatha. It is 10-20 mm in length.
