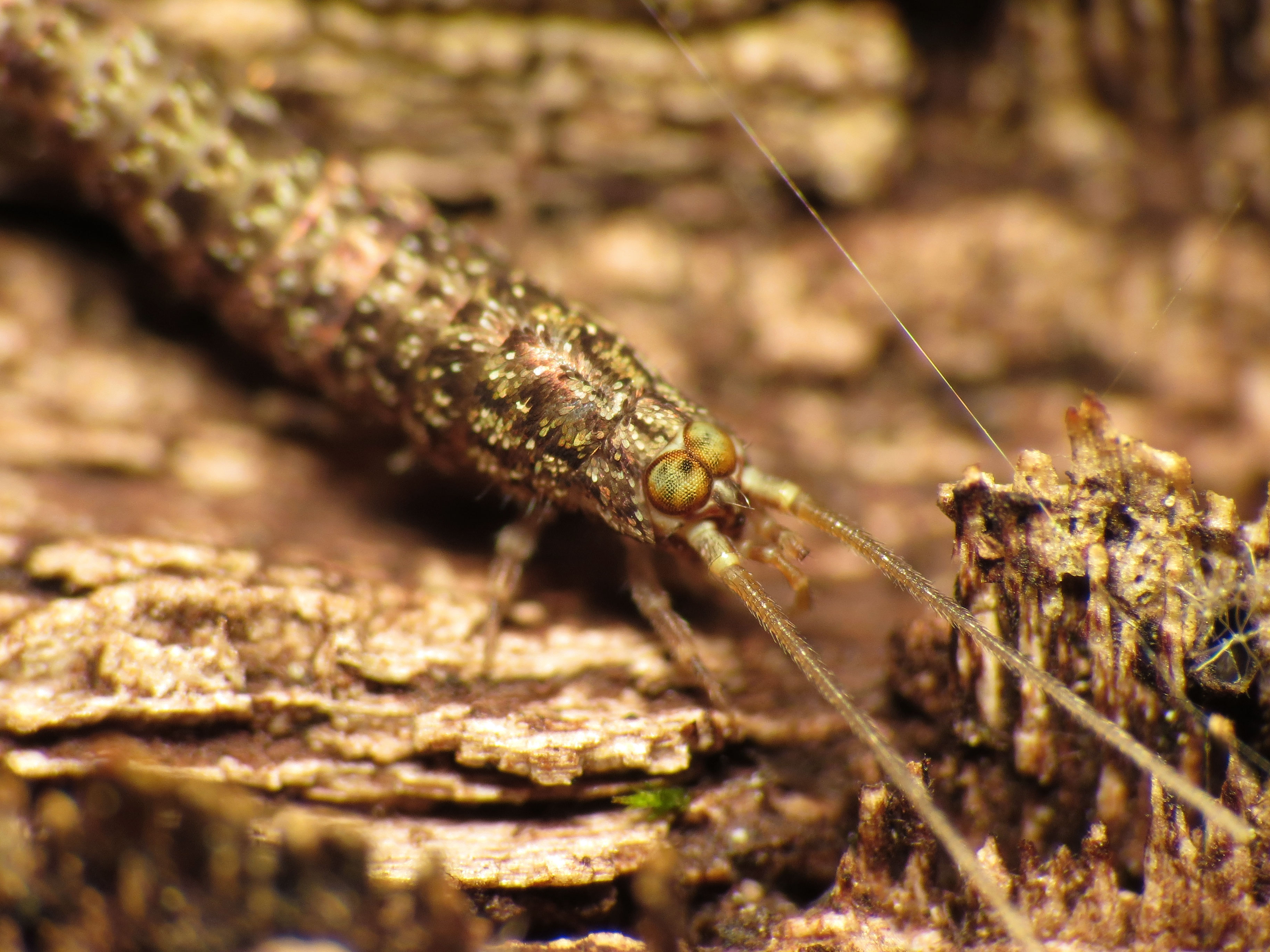
- Machiloides banksi

Scientific classification
- Domain: Eukaryota
- Kingdom: Animalia
- Phylum: Arthropoda
- Class: Insecta
- Order: Archaeognatha
- Family: Meinertellidae
- Genus: Machiloides; Silvestri, 1904

= Machiloides =

Genus of jumping bristletails

Machiloides is a genus of rock bristletails in the family Meinertellidae. There are at least two described species in Machiloides.

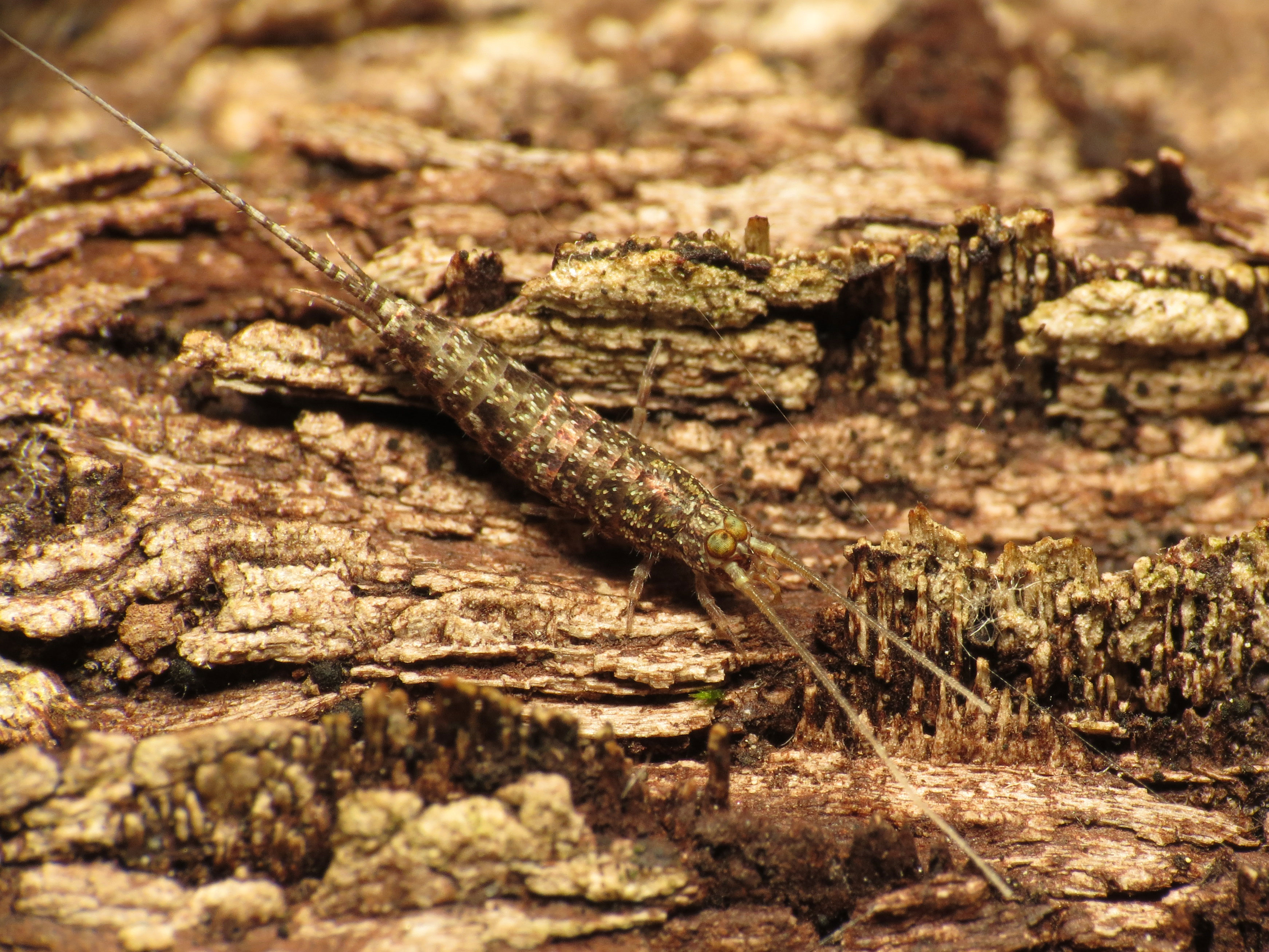
Machiloides banksi

== Species ==
- Machiloides banksi Silvestri, 1911
- Machiloides petauristes Wygodzinsky and Schmidt, 1980
