= Hypomachilodes =

Scientific classification
- Kingdom: Animalia
- Phylum: Arthropoda
- Clade: Pancrustacea
- Class: Insecta
- Order: Archaeognatha
- Family: Meinertellidae
- Genus: Hypomachilodes; Silvestri, 1911

Genus of insects

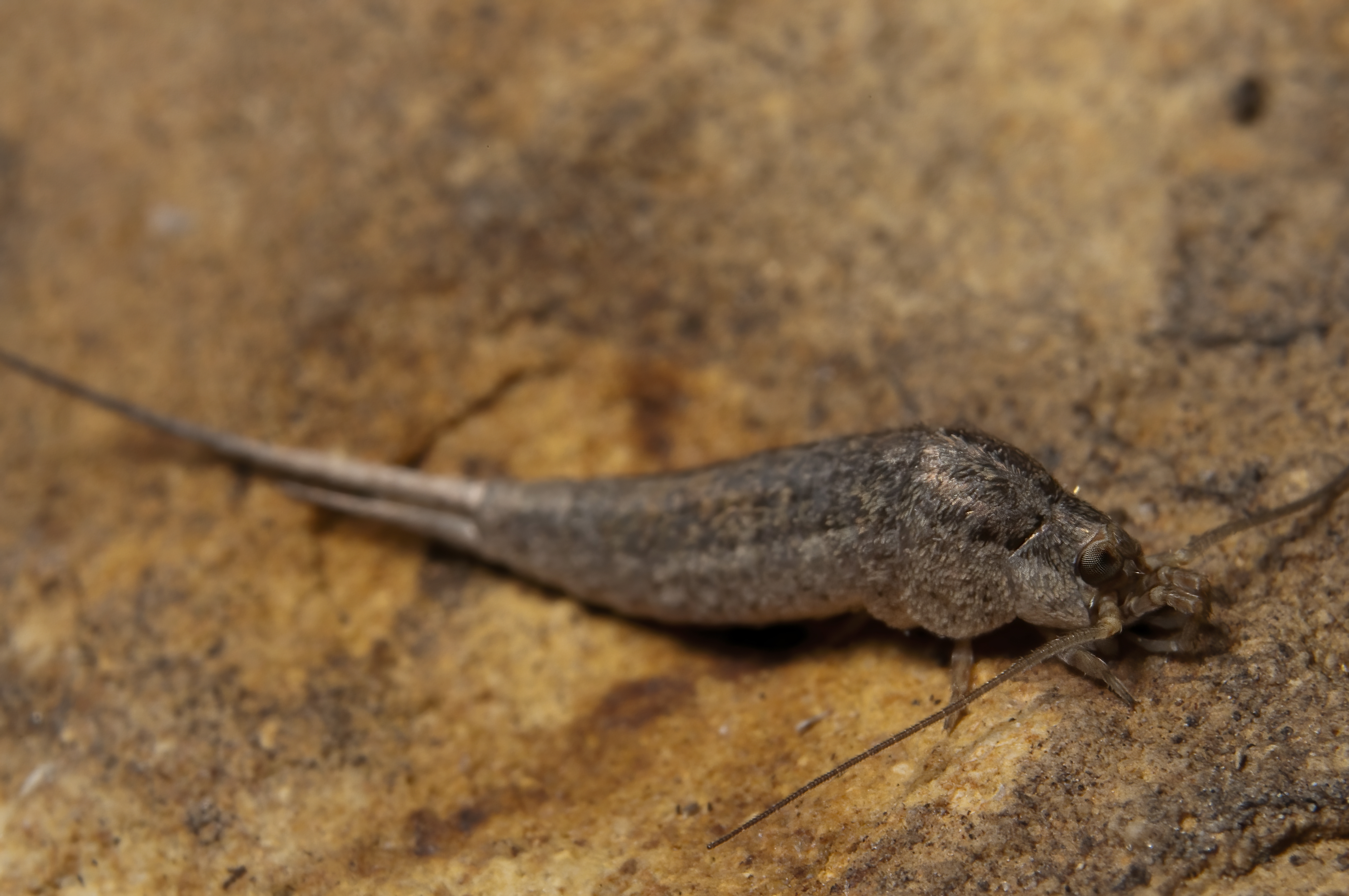
Hypomachilodes forthaysi

Hypomachilodes is a genus of rock bristletail in the family Meinertellidae. There are at least two described species in Hypomachilodes.

== Species ==
These two species belong to the genus Hypomachilodes:

- Hypomachilodes forthaysi Packauskas & Shofner, 2010
- Hypomachilodes texanus Silvestri, 1911
