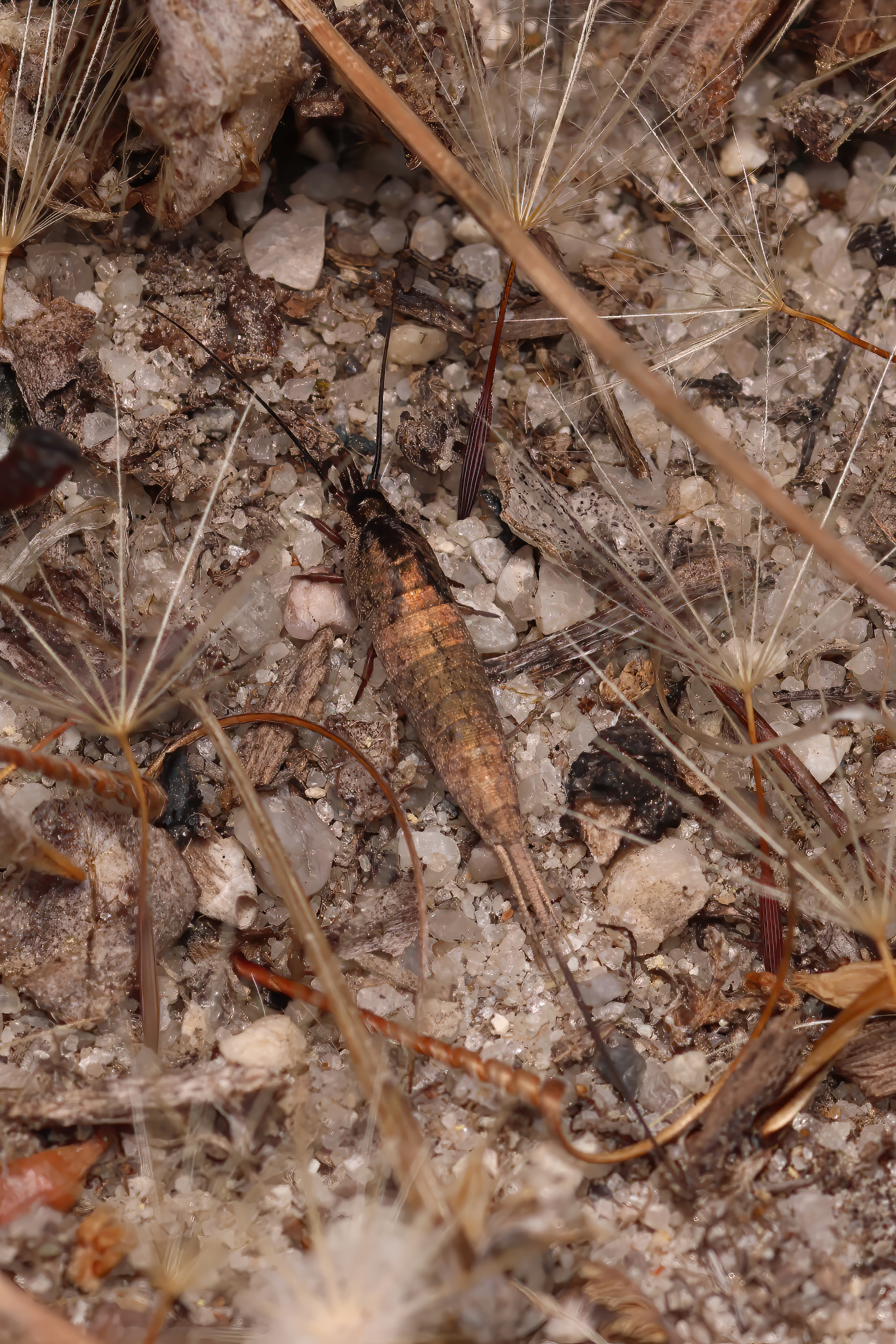
- Machilinus sp. in the Zayante Sandhills of Santa Cruz

Scientific classification
- Kingdom: Animalia
- Phylum: Arthropoda
- Clade: Pancrustacea
- Class: Insecta
- Order: Archaeognatha
- Family: Meinertellidae
- Genus: Machilinus; Silvestri, 1905

= Machilinus =

Genus of jumping bristletails

Machilinus is a genus of rock bristletails in the family Meinertellidae. There are about 17 described species in Machilinus. The members of the genus are active during the day (diurnal).

== Species ==
These 17 species belong to the genus Machilinus:

- Machilinus aurantiacus (Schött, 1897)^{i c g b}
- Machilinus balearicus Notario, Gaju, Bach & Molero, 1997^{g}
- Machilinus bejarensis Bach, 1971^{g}
- Machilinus botellai Gaju, Bach & Molero, 1992^{g}
- Machilinus casasecai Bach, 1974^{g}
- Machilinus costai Notario, Bach & Gaju, 2000^{g}
- Machilinus gadeai Bach & Gaju, 1989^{g}
- Machilinus gredosi Bach, 1971^{g}
- Machilinus helicopalpus Janetschek, 1954^{g}
- Machilinus kleinenbergi (Giardina, 1900)^{g}
- Machilinus portosantensis Mendes, 1981^{g}
- Machilinus rocai Bach, 1975^{g}
- Machilinus rosaliae Mendes, 1977^{g}
- Machilinus rupestris (Lucas, 1846)^{g}
- Machilinus spinifrontis Bach, 1984^{g}
- Machilinus spinosus Bitsch, 1968^{g}
- Machilinus valencianicus Mendes & Bach, 1981^{g}

Data sources: i = ITIS, c = Catalogue of Life, g = GBIF, b = Bugguide.net
