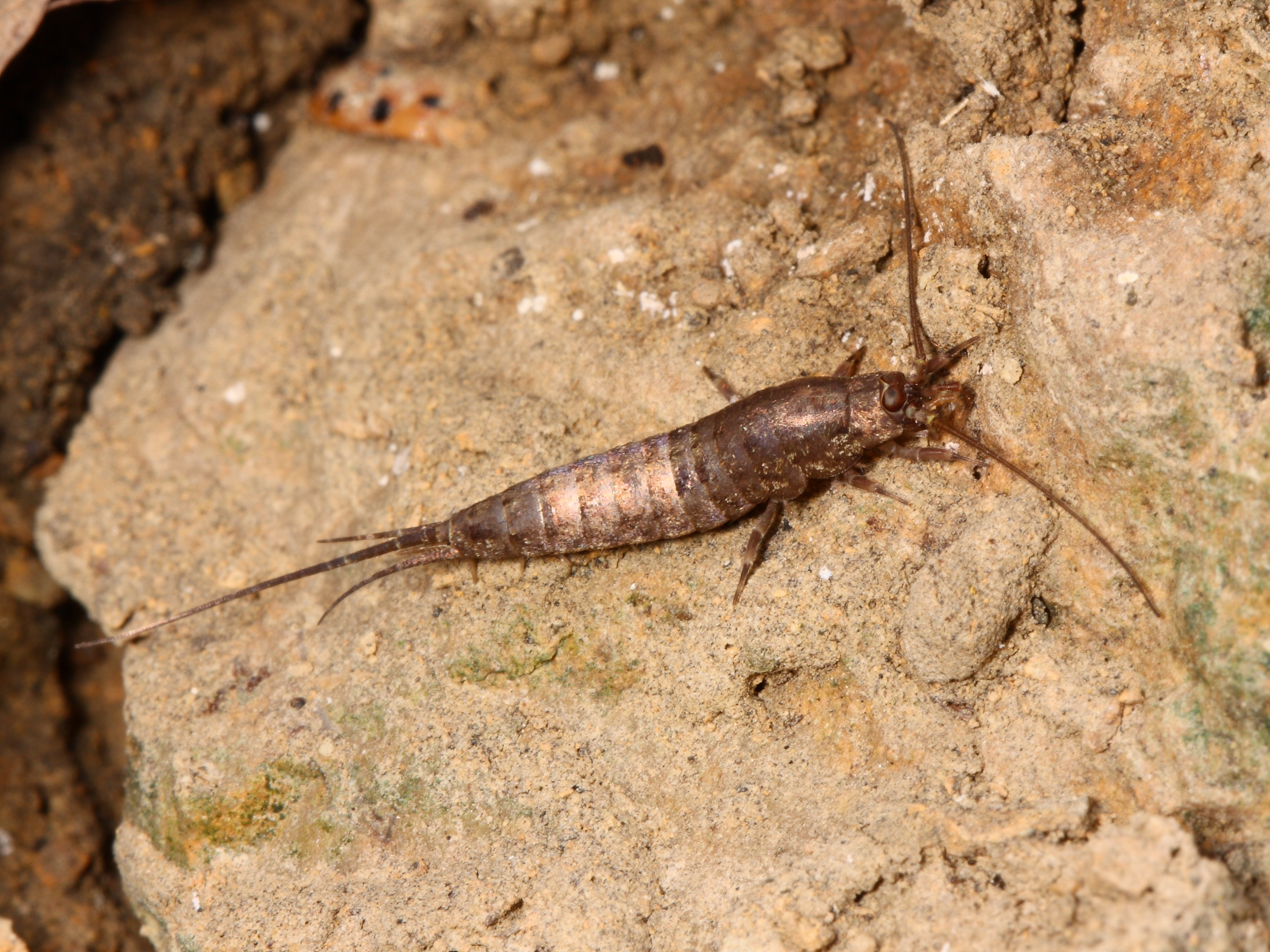
- A Machilinus aurantiacus on Ordovician sedimentary rock

Scientific classification
- Kingdom: Animalia
- Phylum: Arthropoda
- Clade: Pancrustacea
- Class: Insecta
- Order: Archaeognatha
- Family: Meinertellidae; Verhoeff, 1910

Genera
- Hypomachilodes Silvestri, 1911; Machilinus Silvestri, 1905; Machiloides Silvestri, 1904; Meinertellus; Machilontus group: Machilontus Silvestri, 1911; Macropsontus Silvestri, 1911; Machilellus Silvestri, 1910; Machilelloides Sturm & Smith, 1993

= Meinertellidae =

Meinertellidae Temporal range: Barremian–Present

Family of jumping bristletails

The Meinertellidae, commonly known as rock bristletails, is a small family of basally diverging insects belonging to the order Archaeognatha. These insects can be distinguished from members of the other Archaeognatha family, Machilidae, by the lack of scales at the base of the legs and antennae, head, and palps; along with possession of small abdominal sternites protruding slightly between the coxal plates. They can also be distinguished by patches of reddish to violet-brown hypodermal pigment on the appendages.

Members of Archaeognatha are generally petrophilous ("rock-loving"), but species of Meinertellidae living in the Amazon have adapted to a life among the leaf litter on the forest floor, on the tree trunks and up in the canopy. In this wet environment, their eggs have a tolerance for being submerged in water.

Meinertellidae comprise more than 170 species in 19 genera, grouped into the Machiloides group, Machilinus group, Hypomachiloides group, Machilontus group, and Meinertellus group.

== Distribution ==
These insects are principally found in the southern hemisphere, and can be found in rain forests, regular forests, and on coastal cliffs.

== Taxa known from fossils ==
- †Cretaceobrevibusantennis Chen and Su, 2017; Burmese amber, Myanmar, Cenomanian
- †Cretaceomachilis Sturm & Poinar, 1998; Lebanese amber, Barremian, Burmese amber, Myanmar, Cenomanian
- †Glaesimeinertellus Sánchez-García et al., 2019; Lebanese amber, Barremian
- Macropsontus Silvestri, 1911; Lebanese amber, Barremian, Burmese amber, Myanmar, Cenomanian
- Neomachilellus Wygodzinsky, 1953; Neotropics, fossils known from Miocene Dominican and Chiapas ambers.
- †Nullmeinertellus Zhang et al., 2018; Burmese amber, Myanmar, Cenomanian
- †Unimeinertellus Zhang et al., 2018; Burmese amber, Myanmar, Cenomanian

== See also ==
- ITIS page on Meinertellidae
- Basal hexapods
