= Dilta spinulosa =

Scientific classification
- Kingdom: Animalia
- Phylum: Arthropoda
- Clade: Pancrustacea
- Class: Insecta
- Order: Archaeognatha
- Family: Machilidae
- Genus: Dilta
- Species: D. spinulosa

Binomial name
- Dilta spinulosa Bitsch & Bach, 1976

Species of jumping bristletail

Dilta spinulosa is a species of jumping bristletail in the family Machilidae.
