= Dilta italica =

Scientific classification
- Kingdom: Animalia
- Phylum: Arthropoda
- Clade: Pancrustacea
- Class: Insecta
- Order: Archaeognatha
- Family: Machilidae
- Genus: Dilta
- Species: D. italica

Binomial name
- Dilta italica (Grassi, 1887)

Species of jumping bristletail

Dilta italica is a species of jumping bristletail in the family Machilidae.

== Subspecies ==
These two subspecies belong to the species Dilta italica:

- Dilta italica almanzorensis Bach, 1971
- Dilta italica italica (Grassi, 1887)
