= Dilta bitschi =

Scientific classification
- Kingdom: Animalia
- Phylum: Arthropoda
- Clade: Pancrustacea
- Class: Insecta
- Order: Archaeognatha
- Family: Machilidae
- Genus: Dilta
- Species: D. bitschi

Binomial name
- Dilta bitschi Mendes, 1976

Species of jumping bristletail

Dilta bitschi is a species of jumping bristletail in the family Machilidae.
