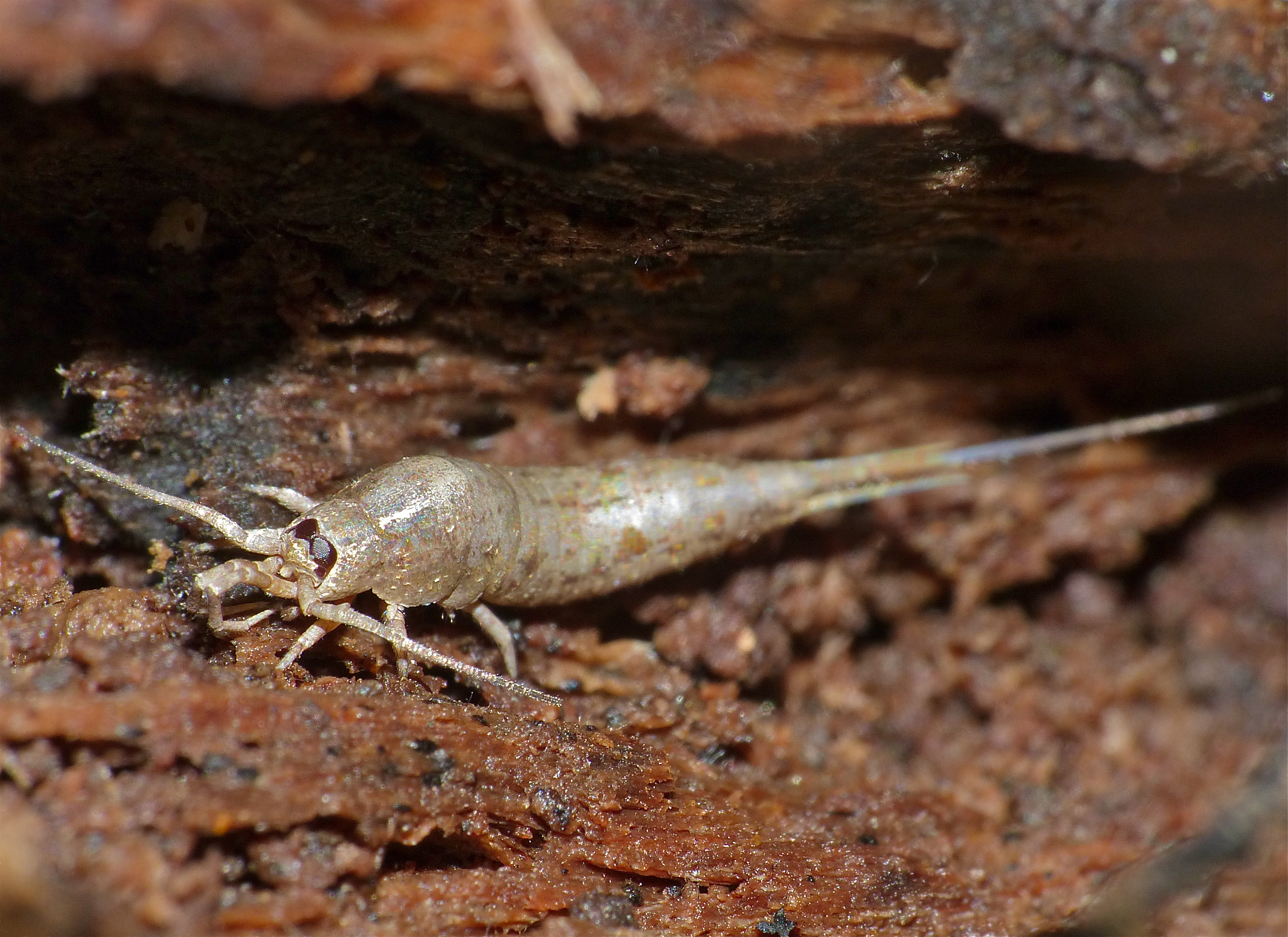
- Dilta hibernica

Scientific classification
- Kingdom: Animalia
- Phylum: Arthropoda
- Clade: Pancrustacea
- Class: Insecta
- Order: Archaeognatha
- Family: Machilidae
- Genus: Dilta; Strand, 1911

Species
- Dilta altenai Dilta bitschi Dilta chateri Dilta concolor Dilta denisi Dilta femina Dilta geresiana Dilta heteropalpa Dilta hibernica Dilta insulicola Dilta isomorpha Dilta italica Dilta littoralis Dilta lundbladi Dilta machadoi Dilta maderiensis Dilta minuta Dilta saxicola Dilta similis Dilta spinulopalpa Dilta spinulosa

= Dilta =

Genus of jumping bristletails

Dilta is a genus of primitive insects belonging to the family Machilidae. These insects are slender and wingless with dull, often mottled, colouring. They are typically found on the ground in heavily vegetated places. Dilta spp are restricted to western Europe and parts of north Africa.
