= Dilta lundbladi =

Scientific classification
- Kingdom: Animalia
- Phylum: Arthropoda
- Clade: Pancrustacea
- Class: Insecta
- Order: Archaeognatha
- Family: Machilidae
- Genus: Dilta
- Species: D. lundbladi

Binomial name
- Dilta lundbladi Agrell, 1944

Species of jumping bristletail

Dilta lundbladi is a species of jumping bristletail in the family Machilidae. It is found in Europe.
