= Dilta similis =

Scientific classification
- Kingdom: Animalia
- Phylum: Arthropoda
- Clade: Pancrustacea
- Class: Insecta
- Order: Archaeognatha
- Family: Machilidae
- Genus: Dilta
- Species: D. similis

Binomial name
- Dilta similis Janetschek, 1954

Species of jumping bristletail

Dilta similis is a species of jumping bristletail in the family Machilidae.
