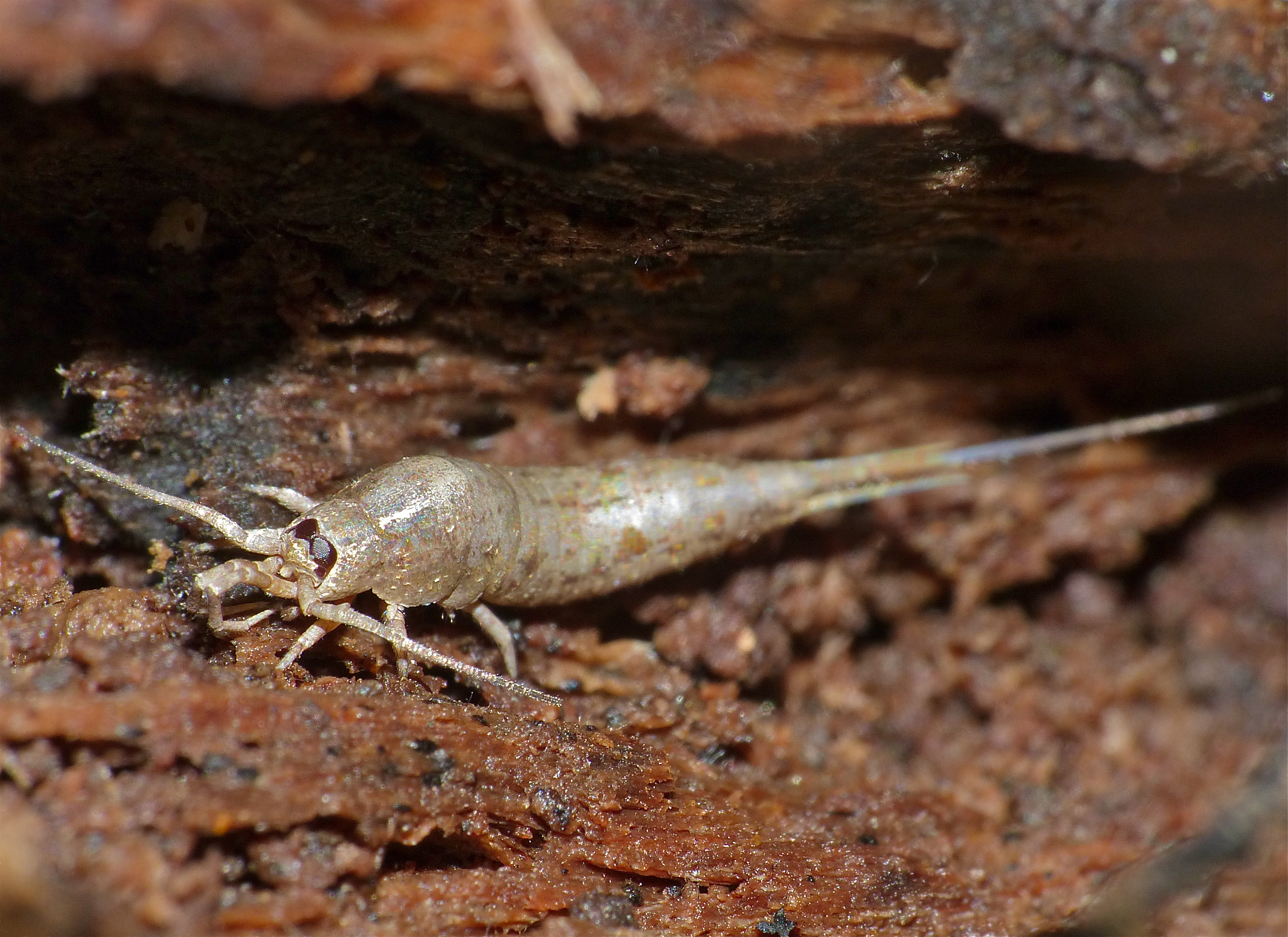

Scientific classification
- Kingdom: Animalia
- Phylum: Arthropoda
- Clade: Pancrustacea
- Class: Insecta
- Order: Archaeognatha
- Family: Machilidae
- Genus: Dilta
- Species: D. hibernica

Binomial name
- Dilta hibernica (Carpenter, 1907)

= Dilta hibernica =

Species of jumping bristletail

Dilta hibernica is a species of jumping bristletail in the family Machilidae. It is found in Europe.
