= Bookworm (insect) =

Any insect that is said to bore through books

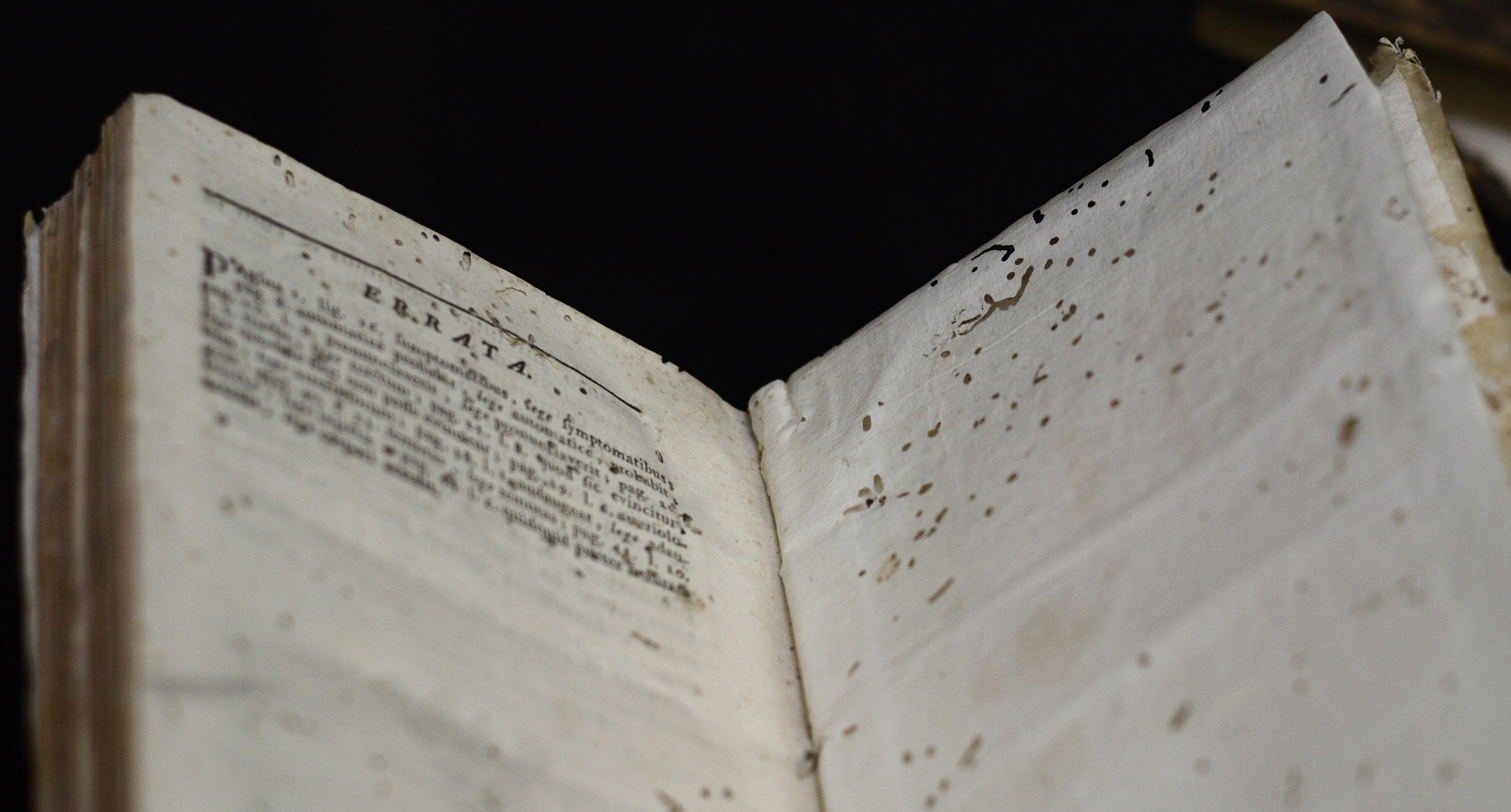
Pages riddled with bookworm damage on Errata

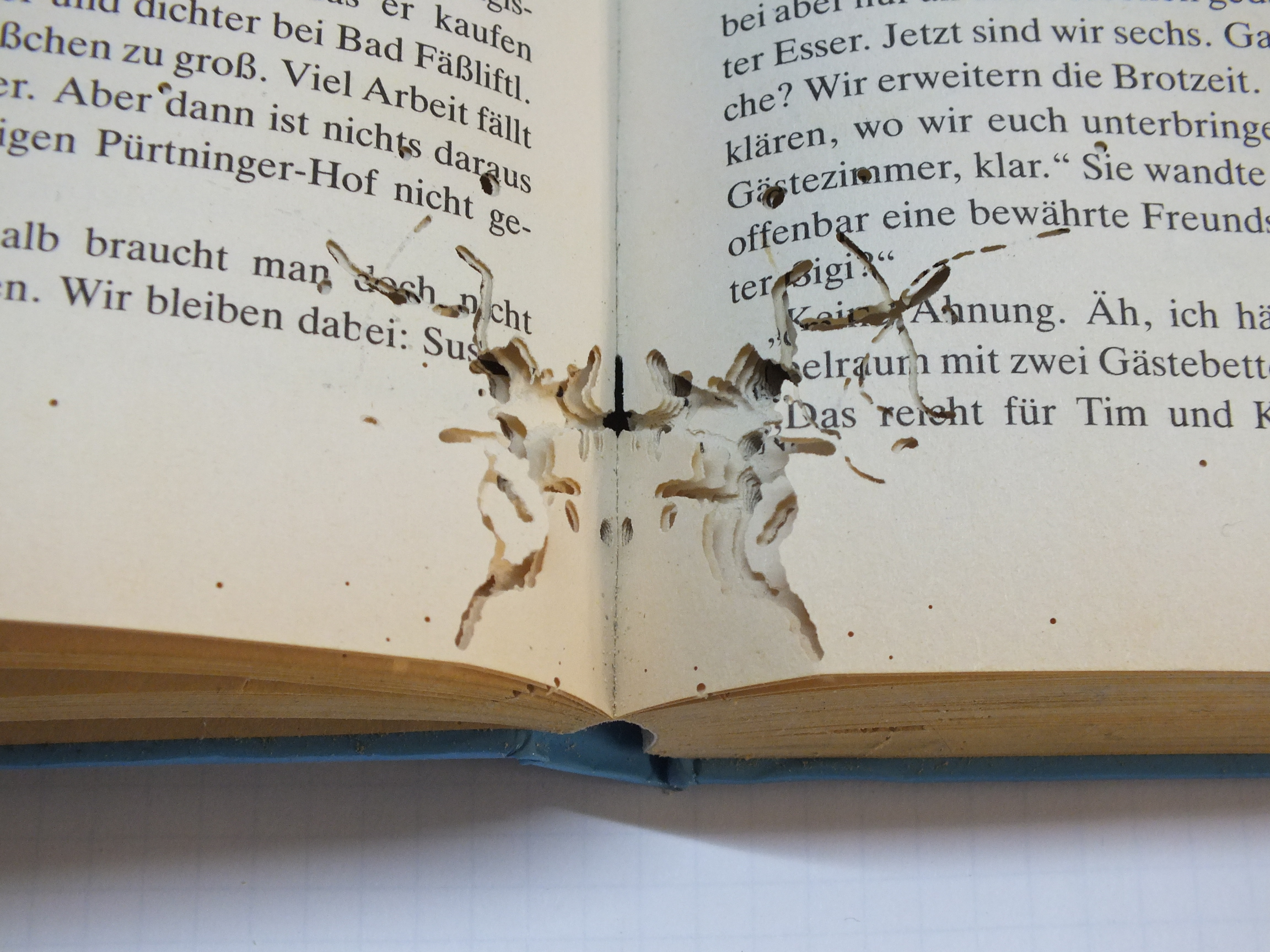
Traces of a bookworm in a book

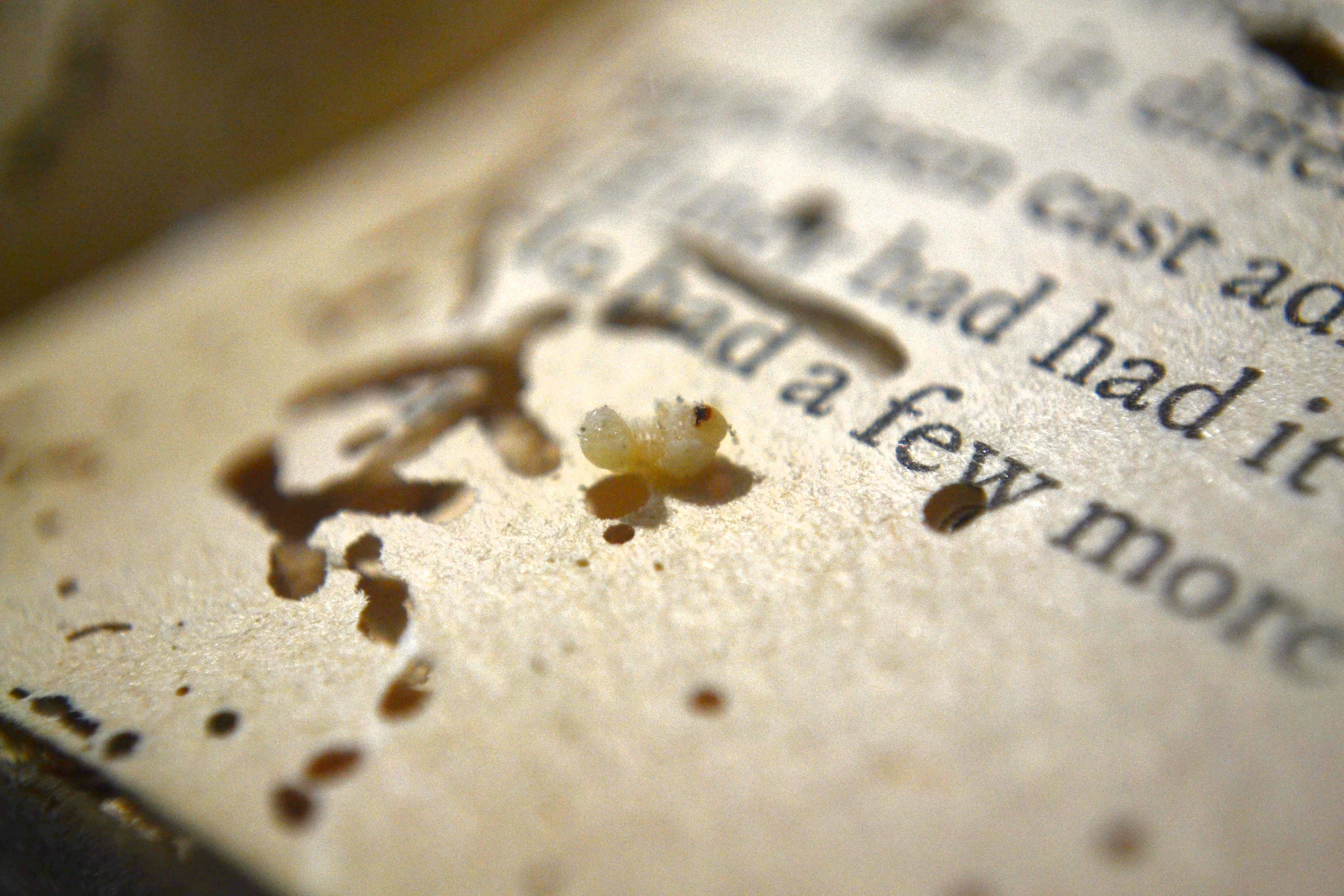
A bookworm / beetle grub found inside a paperback book, showing some of the damage it has wrought

Bookworm is a general name for any insect that is said to bore through books.

The damage to books that is commonly attributed to "bookworms" is often caused by the larvae of various types of insects, including beetles, moths, and cockroaches, which may bore or chew through books seeking food. The damage is not caused by any species of worm. Some such larvae exhibit a superficial resemblance to worms and are the likely inspiration for the term, though they are not true worms. In other cases, termites, carpenter ants, and woodboring beetles will first infest wooden bookshelves and later feed on books placed upon the shelves, attracted by the wood-pulp paper used in most commercial book production.

True book-borers are uncommon. The primary food sources for many "bookworms" are the leather or cloth bindings of a book, the glue used in the binding process, or molds and fungi that grow on or inside books. When the pages themselves are attacked, a gradual encroachment across the surface of one page or a small number of pages is typical, rather than the boring of holes through the entire book.

The original meaning of the word bookworm, dating from the 1590s, was as an idiom for a bibliophile, who reads a great deal or to perceived excess: someone who devours books metaphorically. The use of the term for book-devouring insects arrived later, by 1713.

== Booklice ==
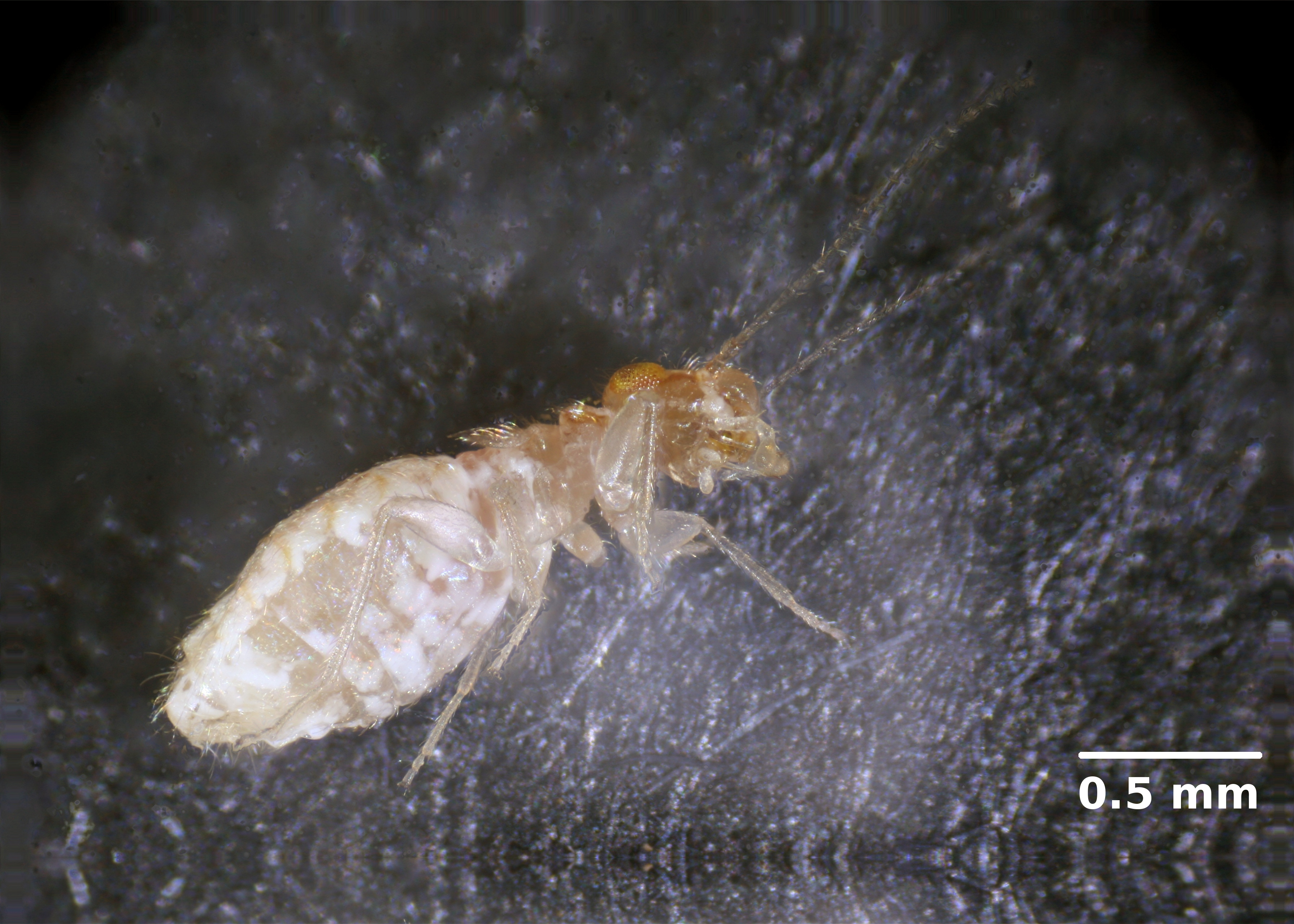
A booklouse

Booklice are not true lice, as they do not feed on living hosts; rather, the booklouse, also known as a paperlouse, is a soft-bodied, wingless insect in the order Psocoptera (usually Trogium pulsatorium), typically 1 mm or less in length. Booklice feed on microscopic molds and other organic matter found in or on aging items that have been stored in places that lack the climate control necessary to inhibit organic growth. Areas of archives, libraries, and museums that are cool, damp, dark, and generally undisturbed are common sites for such growth, generating a food source which subsequently attracts booklice. Booklice will also attack bindings, glue, and paper.

By the 20th century, bookbinding materials had developed a high resistance against damage by various types of book-boring insects. Many museums and archives in possession of materials vulnerable to booklouse damage employ pest control methods to manage existing infestations and make use of climate control to prevent the growth of potential booklouse food sources.

== Other book-eating insects ==
=== Beetles ===
Of the quarter million species of beetles, some adults damage books by eating paper and binding materials themselves. However, their larvae do the most damage. Typically eggs are laid on the book's edges and spine. Upon hatching, they bore into, and sometimes even through, the book.

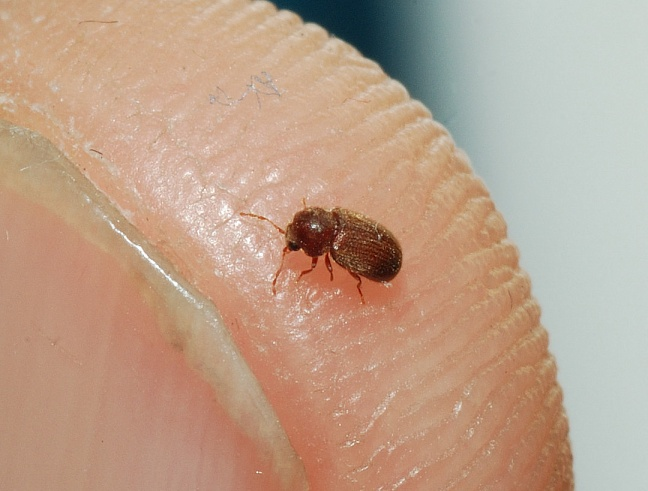
Drugstore beetle on a human finger

==== Woodboring beetles ====
- Common furniture beetle
- Deathwatch beetle
- The genus Gastrallus
- Indian bookworm beetle
- Australian spider beetle
- Cigarette beetle
- Drugstore beetle

==== Auger beetles ====
- Lesser grain borer

==== Long horned beetles ====
- House longhorn beetle

==== Bark beetles ====
- Flat bark beetle
- Merchant beetle
- Sawtoothed grain beetle

==== True weevils ====
- Rice weevil
- Wheat weevil

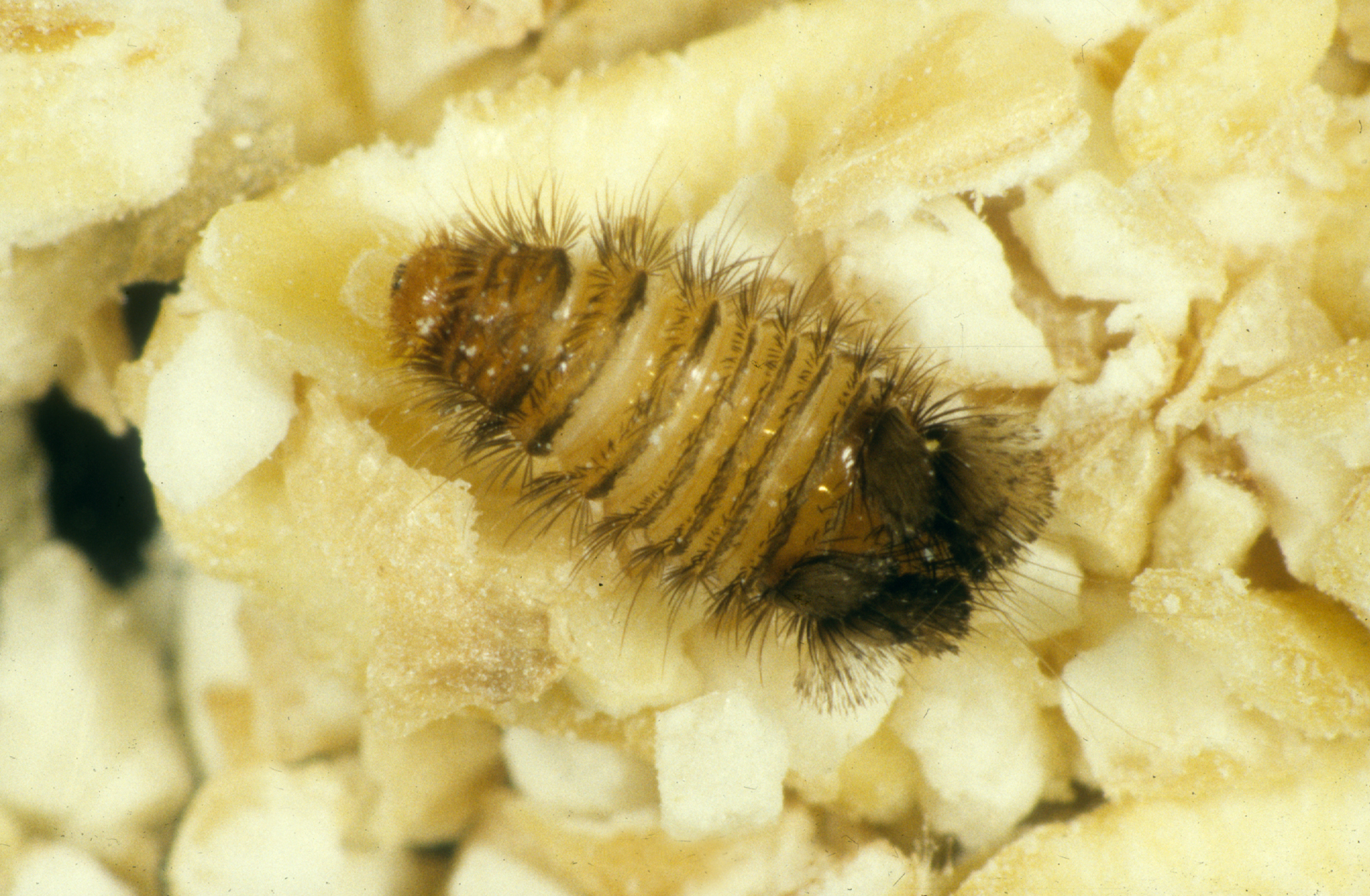
Larval stage of the museum beetle Anthrenus museorum

==== Skin beetles ====
These beetles have been known to feed on leather bindings.

- Furniture carpet beetle
- Museum beetle
- Common carpet beetle
- Varied carpet beetle
- Fur beetle
- Black carpet beetle
- Dermestes coarctatus
- Larder beetle
- Dermestes maculatus
- Dermestes vorax
- Khapra beetle
- Reesa
- Trogoderma versicolor
- Odd beetle

==== Powderpost beetles ====
- African powderpost beetle
- Brown powderpost beetle
- Black powderpost beetle

==== Darkling beetles ====
- Confused flour beetle
- Destructive flour beetle
- Dark mealworm beetle
- Mealworm
- Red flour beetle

=== Termites ===
Termites are the most devastating type of book-eating pest. They will eat almost every part of a book including paper, cloth, and cardboard, not to mention the damage that can be done to shelves. Termites can make entire collections unusable before the infestation is even noticed.

- Powderpost termite
- Western drywood termite

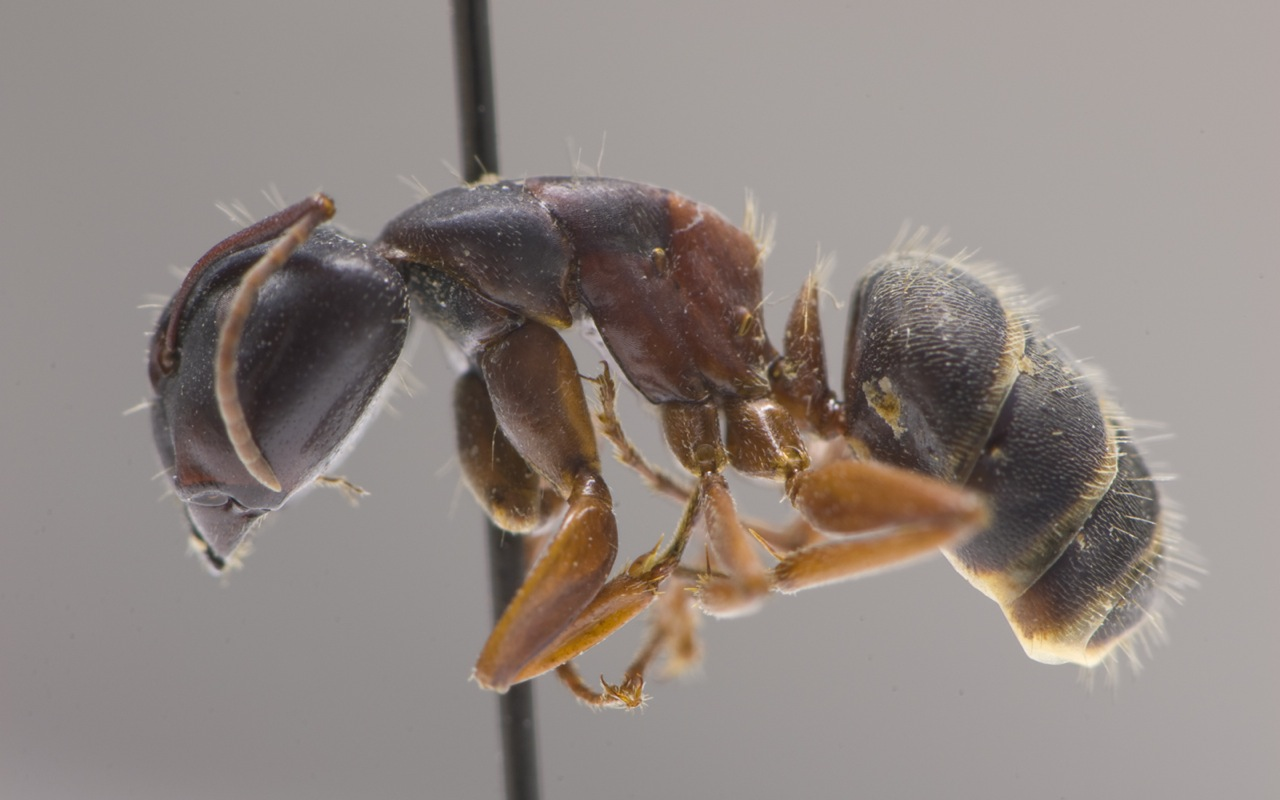
Hercules Ant (Camponotus herculeanus)

=== Ants ===
Some species of ants can damage books in a way that is similar to termites.

- Black carpenter ant
- Camponotus obscuripes
- Hercules ant

=== Moths ===
Clothes moths will, in addition to attacking clothes and fabrics, also feed on bookbindings, decaying organic material (which includes paper), and mold.

==== Fungus moths ====
- Carpet moth
- Case-bearing clothes moth
- Common clothing moth
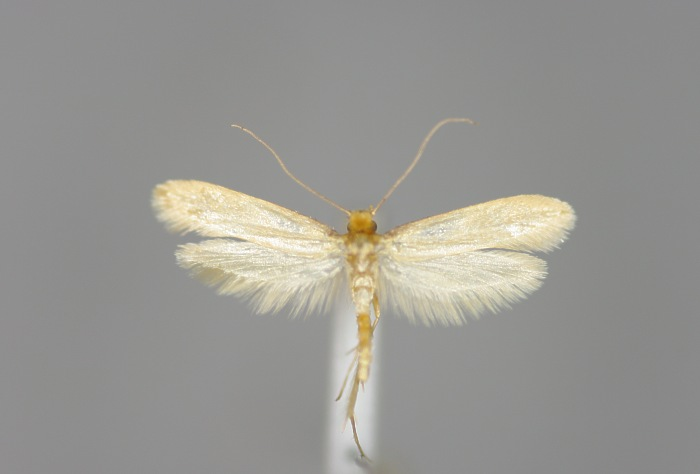
  Tineola bisselliella, common clothing moth

==== Pyralid moths ====
- Mediterranean flour moth
- Indianmeal moth
- Warehouse moth

==== Concealer moths ====
- brown house moth

=== Cockroaches ===
Book-damaging cockroach species chew away at the starch in cloth bindings and paper. Their droppings can also harm books.

==== Wood cockroaches ====
- German cockroach

==== Household cockroaches ====
- American cockroach
- Oriental cockroach
- Smokybrown cockroach
- Australian cockroach

=== Zygentoma ===
These insects consume portions of books that contain polysaccharides. Paper that is slightly ragged at the edges is usually the work of silverfish.

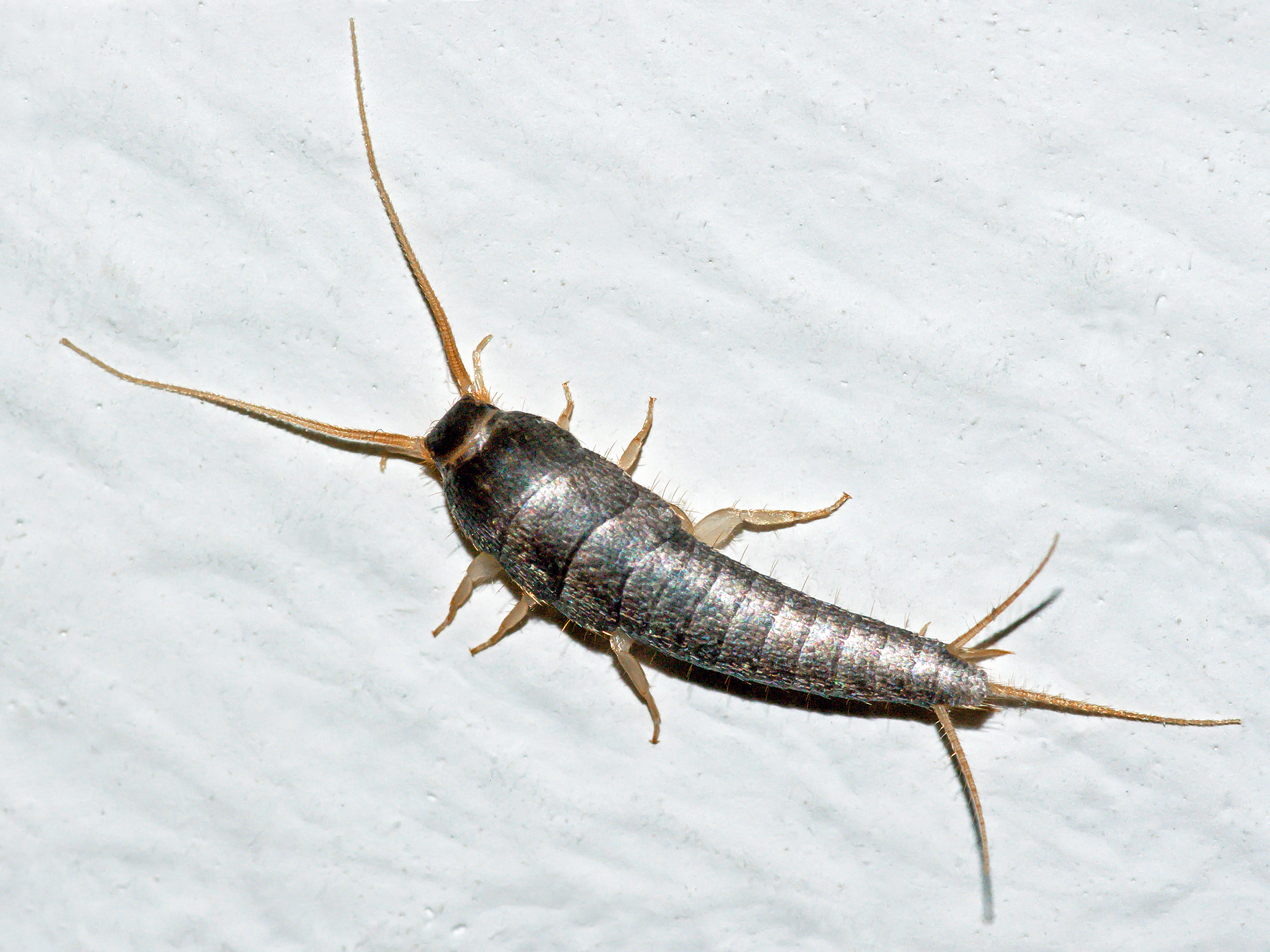
Silverfish (Lepisma saccharina)

==== Lepismatidae ====
- Firebrat
- Silverfish

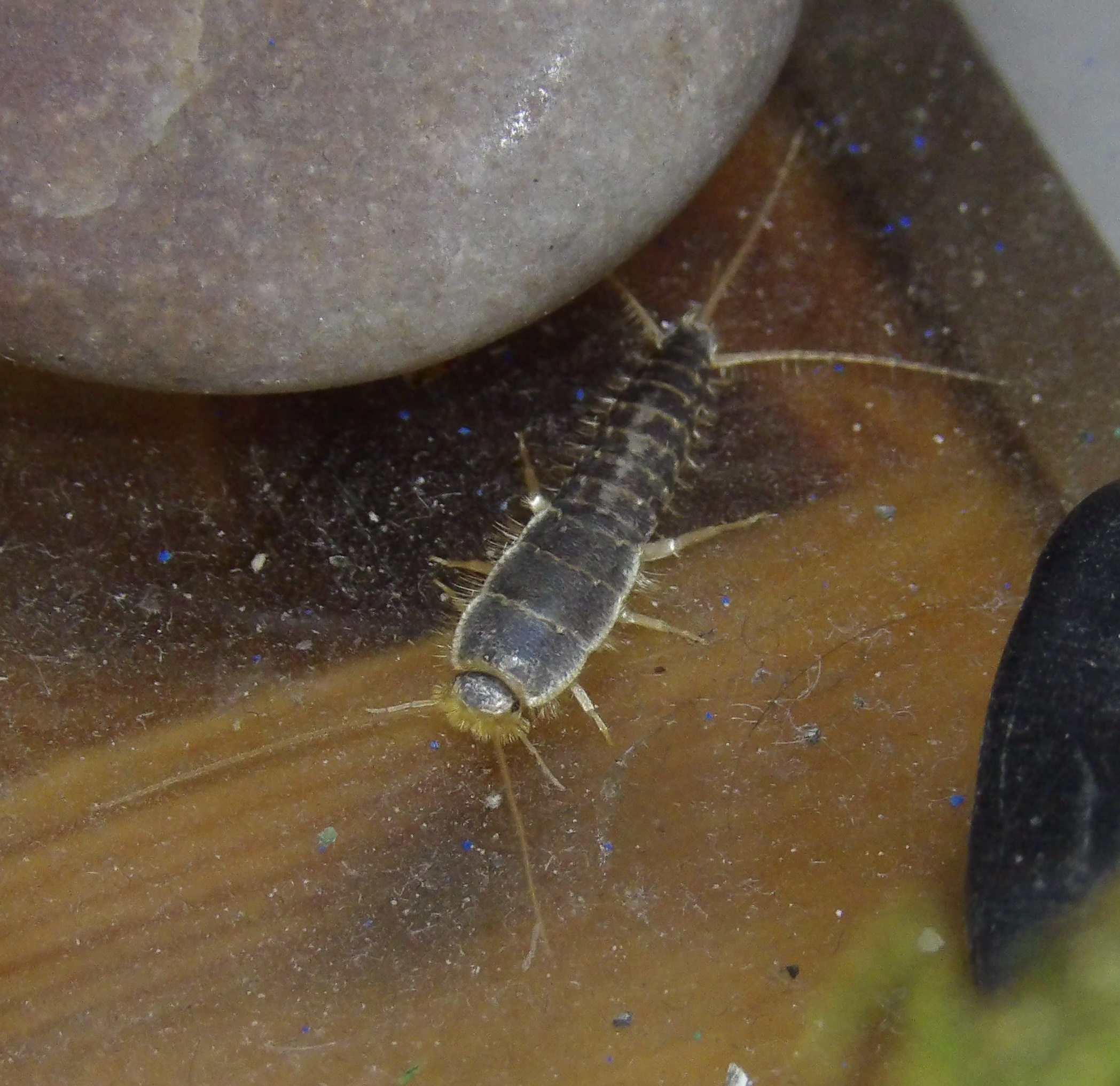
Thermobia domestica, firebrat

== Management ==
Human awareness of bookworms dates back to the Middle Ages, when infested books were identified and burned.

Pesticides can be used to protect books from these insects, but they are often made with harsh chemicals that make them an unattractive option. Museums and universities that want to keep their archives bookworm free without using pesticides often turn towards temperature control. Books can be stored at low temperatures that keep eggs from hatching, or placed in a deep-freezer to kill larvae and adults. The idea was taken from commercial food storage practices, as they are often dealing with the same pests. Pseudoscorpions such as Chelifer cancroides may live in books and feed on book-eating insects, controlling their numbers.

== In human culture ==
Bookworms were one of the threats to book preservation identified by 19th Century collector and printer William Blades in his work The Enemies of Books. How to protect papyrus, paper (and later parchment) collections from bugs is a topic that already Aristotle was interested in and that kept librarians busy through the centuries.

The term bookworm is also used idiomatically to describe an avid or voracious reader, or a bibliophile. In its earliest iterations, it had a negative connotation, referring to someone who would rather read than participate in the world around them. Over the years its meaning has drifted in a more positive direction.
