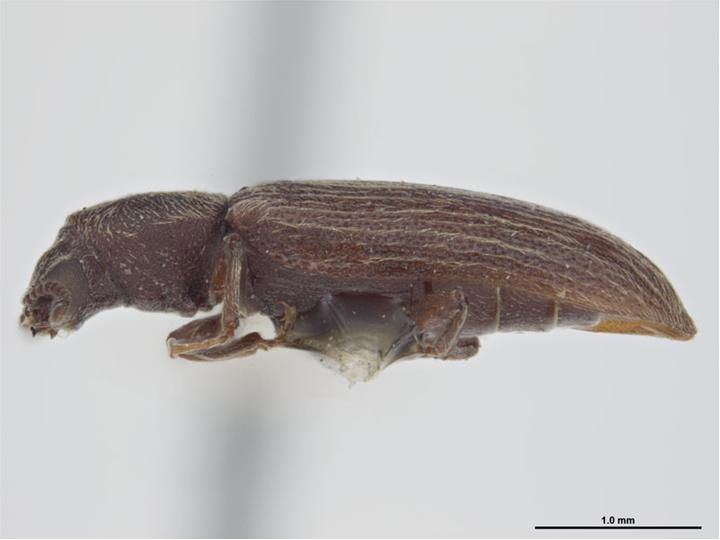

Scientific classification
- Domain: Eukaryota
- Kingdom: Animalia
- Phylum: Arthropoda
- Class: Insecta
- Order: Coleoptera
- Suborder: Polyphaga
- Family: Bostrichidae
- Genus: Lyctus
- Species: L. opaculus

Binomial name
- Lyctus opaculus LeConte, 1866

= Lyctus opaculus =

Species of beetle

Lyctus opaculus is a species of powder-post beetle in the family Bostrichidae. It is found in North America.
