= Lyctus villosus =

Scientific classification
- Domain: Eukaryota
- Kingdom: Animalia
- Phylum: Arthropoda
- Class: Insecta
- Order: Coleoptera
- Suborder: Polyphaga
- Family: Bostrichidae
- Genus: Lyctus
- Species: L. villosus

Binomial name
- Lyctus villosus Lesne, 1911

Species of beetle

Lyctus villosus is a species of powder-post beetle in the family Bostrichidae. It is found in the Caribbean Sea, Central America, North America, Oceania, and South America.
