= Eugene Jordan Gerberg =

American entomologist

- Born: June 1, 1919; Brooklyn, New York, U.S.
- Died: December 19, 2011 (aged 92); Gainesville, Florida, U.S.
- Education: B.S., M.S. Cornell University; Ph.D. University of Maryland
- Known for: Entomologist, Entrepreneur

Eugene J. Gerberg (1919–2011), also known as Gene Gerberg, was an American entomologist and entomological entrepreneur.

Born June 1, 1919, in Brooklyn, New York, Gerberg completed a Bachelor of Science degree in entomology in 1939, and then a Master of Science degree in 1941, both at Cornell University, Ithaca, New York.

In 1941, Gerberg accepted a commission as first lieutenant in the U.S. Public Health Service. His first assignment was with the Malaria Control in War Areas (MCWA) unit at New Smyrna Beach, Florida, established to control malaria around military training bases in areas where mosquitoes were abundant, to prevent reintroduction of malaria into the civilian population by mosquitoes feeding on malaria-infected soldiers. MCWA, the forerunner of the U.S. Centers for Disease Control and Prevention, also trained state and local health department officials in malaria control strategies and techniques.

In 1943, Gerberg was commissioned a second lieutenant in the U.S. Army Sanitary Corps and assigned as assistant camp medical inspector for Camp Lee, Virginia, charged with ridding the barracks of an infestation of bed bugs so severe it had received Congressional attention. After the war, he transferred to the U.S. Army Reserves to continue his military service.

In 1946, Gerberg co-founded Insect Control & Research in Baltimore, Maryland, a business venture that became highly successful for him and his partners. In 1954, he completed his Doctor of Philosophy degree in entomology and plant pathology at the University of Maryland, College Park, Maryland.

Gerberg's notable achievements include several seminal publications. He authored the first U.S. Public Health Service pictorial key for the identification of anopheline mosquito larvae for the national malaria control program (1943), a revision of the New World species of powder post beetles of the family Lyctidae (1957), a manual for mosquito rearing and experimental techniques (1970), a manual of Florida butterflies (1989), and a bibliography of publications dealing with repellents effective against blood-feeding arthropods and leeches (2001). For many years, he single-handedly updated and published the World Directory of Arthropod Vector Research & Control Specialists on an annual basis.

In the 1990s, Gerberg retired as a colonel from the U.S. Army Medical Service Corps and an adjunct professor of entomology at the University of Florida, but remained active in the entomology community. He died in Gainesville, Florida, on December 19, 2011, at the age of 92.

== Honors ==
Gerberg's work and expertise were recognized with a number of awards over the years, including the American Mosquito Control Association's Meritorious Service Award in 1980, life membership in the National Pest Control Association awarded in 1980, American Registry of Professional Entomologists' Outstanding Medical/Veterinary Entomologist for 1983, and honorary membership in the Entomological Society of America in 1993 and the Florida Entomological Society in 1995.
