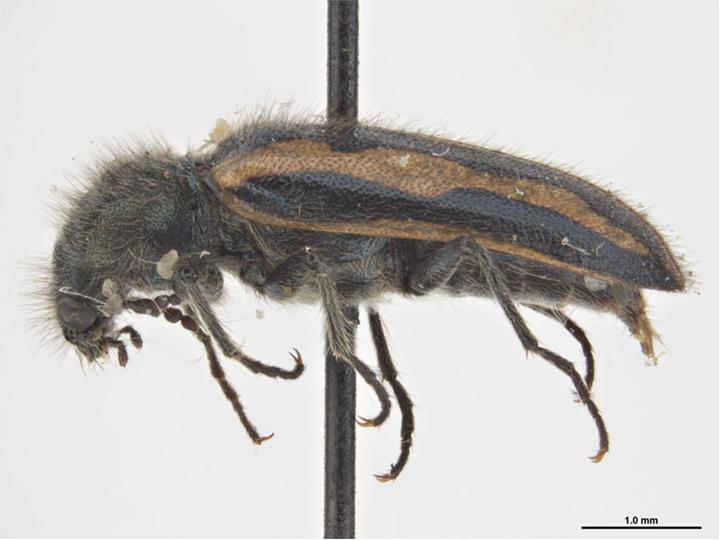
- Psoa maculata

Scientific classification
- Kingdom: Animalia
- Phylum: Arthropoda
- Class: Insecta
- Order: Coleoptera
- Suborder: Polyphaga
- Family: Bostrichidae
- Subfamily: Psoinae
- Tribe: Psoini
- Genus: Psoa; Herbst, 1797

Synonyms
- Acrepis Leconte, 1852; Psoanus Rafinesque, 1815

= Psoa =

Genus of beetles

Psoa is a genus of bostrichid beetles in the family Bostrichidae. There are about five described species in Psoa. The type species is Psoa viennensis.

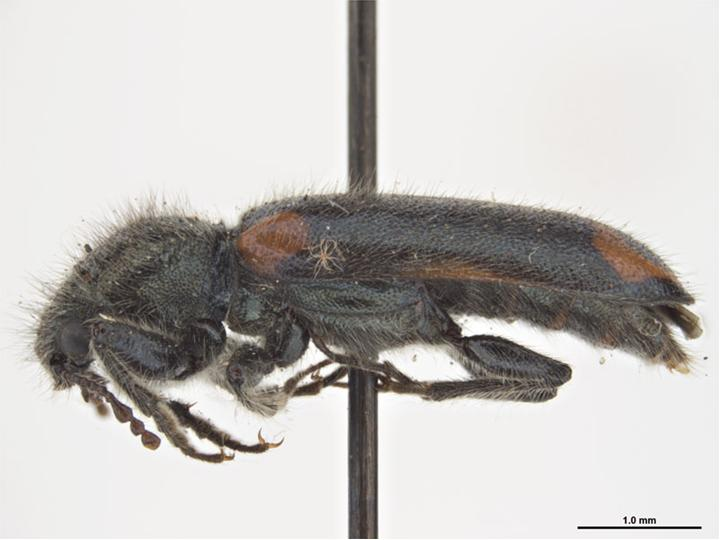
Psoa quadrisignata

== Species ==
These five species belong to the genus Psoa:

- Psoa dubia (Rossi, 1792) (Africa, Europe, Northern Asia)
- Psoa maculata (LeConte, 1852) (North America)
- Psoa quadrinotata Blanchard, 1851 (South America)
- Psoa quadrisignata (Horn, 1868) (Central and North America)
- Psoa viennensis Herbst, 1797 (Europe, Northern Asia)
