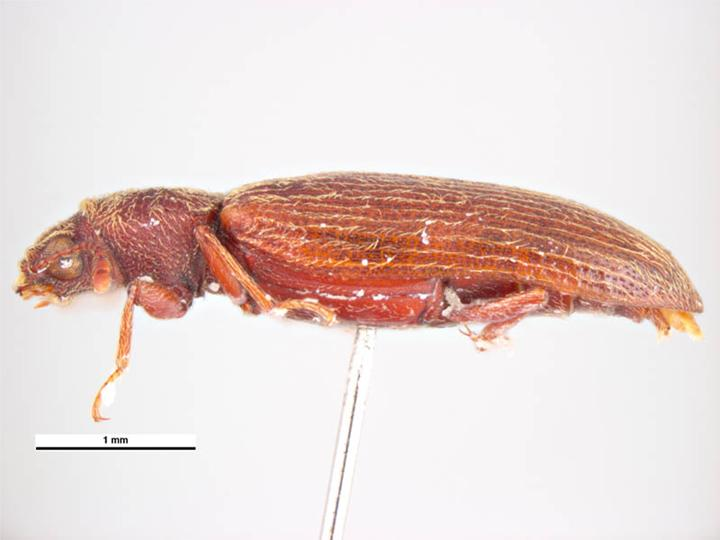

Scientific classification
- Kingdom: Animalia
- Phylum: Arthropoda
- Class: Insecta
- Order: Coleoptera
- Suborder: Polyphaga
- Family: Bostrichidae
- Genus: Lyctus
- Species: L. cavicollis

Binomial name
- Lyctus cavicollis LeConte, 1866

= Lyctus cavicollis =

Species of beetle

Lyctus cavicollis, known generally as the shiny powderpost beetle or western lyctus beetle, is a species of powder-post beetle in the family Bostrichidae. It is found in Australia, Europe and Northern Asia (excluding China), and North America.
