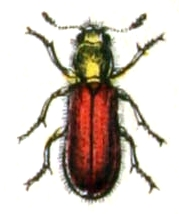
- Psoa viennensis

Scientific classification
- Kingdom: Animalia
- Phylum: Arthropoda
- Clade: Pancrustacea
- Class: Insecta
- Order: Coleoptera
- Suborder: Polyphaga
- Family: Bostrichidae
- Subfamily: Psoinae; Blanchard, 1851

Genera
- Chilenius; Coccographis; Heteropsoa; Psoa; Psoidia; Stenomera

= Psoinae =

Subfamily of beetles

Psoinae is a small subfamily of beetles in the family Bostrichidae.
