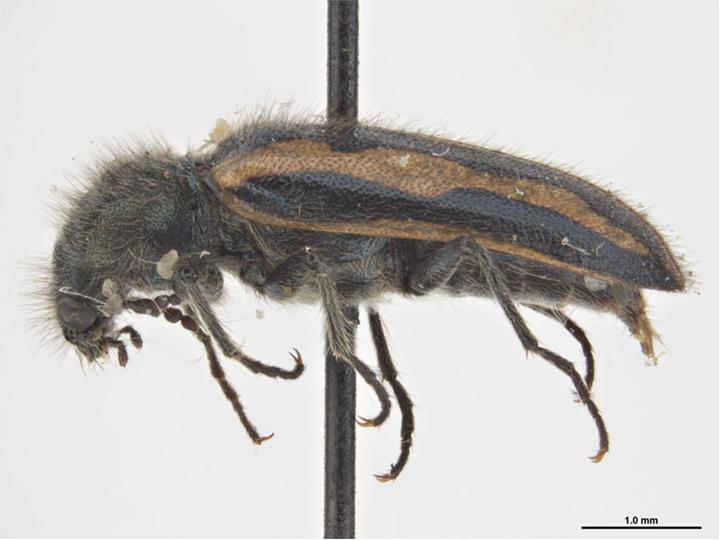

Scientific classification
- Domain: Eukaryota
- Kingdom: Animalia
- Phylum: Arthropoda
- Class: Insecta
- Order: Coleoptera
- Suborder: Polyphaga
- Family: Bostrichidae
- Genus: Psoa
- Species: P. maculata

Binomial name
- Psoa maculata (LeConte, 1852)

= Psoa maculata =

Species of beetle

Psoa maculata is a species of horned powder-post beetle in the family Bostrichidae. It is found in North America.
