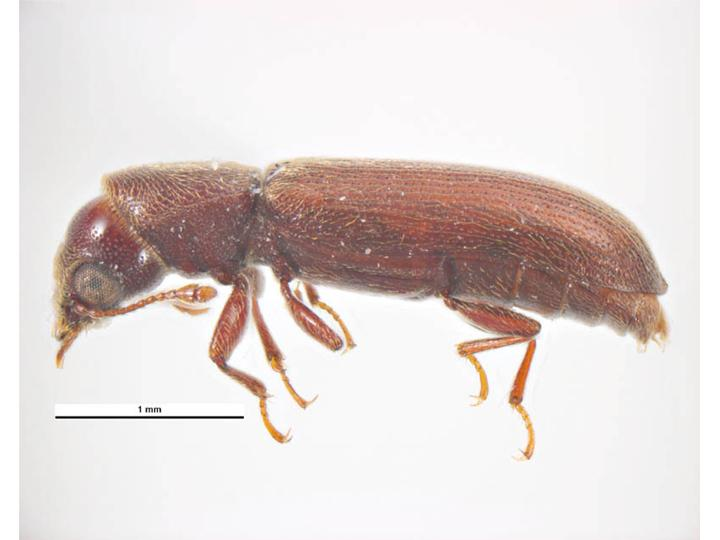
- Lyctus africanus

Scientific classification
- Kingdom: Animalia
- Phylum: Arthropoda
- Class: Insecta
- Order: Coleoptera
- Suborder: Polyphaga
- Family: Bostrichidae
- Subfamily: Lyctinae
- Tribe: Lyctini
- Genus: Lyctus; Fabricius, 1792

= Lyctus (beetle) =

Genus of beetles

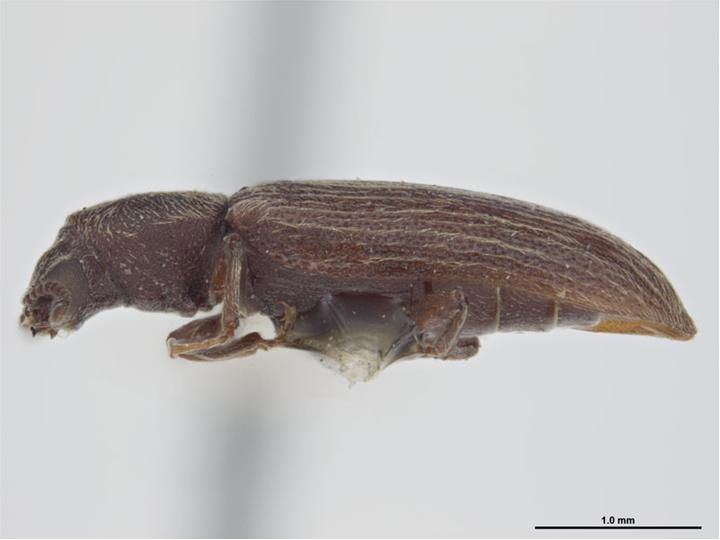
Lyctus opaculus

Lyctus is a genus of powder-post beetles in the family Bostrichidae, being present on all continents except Antarctica.

== Species ==
These species belong to the genus Lyctus:

- Lyctus africanus Lesne, 1907^{i c g b} (African powderpost beetle)
- Lyctus argentinensis Santoro, 1960^{i c g}
- Lyctus asiaticus Iablokoff-Khnzorian, 1976^{i c g}
- Lyctus brunneus (Stephens, 1830)^{i c g b} (brown powderpost beetle)
- Lyctus carbonarius Waltl, 1832^{i c g b} (southern lyctus beetle, = Lyctus planicollis)
- Lyctus caribeanus Lesne, 1931^{i c g b}
- Lyctus cavicollis LeConte, 1866^{i c g b} (shiny powderpost beetle)
- Lyctus chacoensis Santoro, 1960^{i c g}
- Lyctus chilensis Gerberg, 1957^{i c g}
- Lyctus cinereus Blanchard, 1851^{i c g}
- Lyctus discedens Blackburn, 1888^{i c g}
- Lyctus hipposideros Lesne, 1908^{i c g}
- Lyctus histeroides Fabricius, 1792^{g}
- Lyctus kosciuszkoi Borowski and Wegrzynowicz, 2007^{c g}
- Lyctus linearis (Goeze, 1777)^{i c g b} (European powderpost beetle)
- Lyctus longicornis Reitter, 1879^{i c g}
- Lyctus opaculus LeConte, 1866^{i c g b}
- Lyctus parallelocollis Blackburn, 1888^{i c g}
- Lyctus parvulus Casey, 1885^{i g}
- Lyctus patagonicus Santoro, 1960^{i c g}
- Lyctus pubescens Panzer, 1793^{i c g}
- Lyctus simplex Reitter, 1879^{i c g}
- Lyctus sinensis Lesne, 1911^{i c g}
- Lyctus suturalis Faldermann, 1837^{i c g}
- Lyctus tomentosus Reitter, 1879^{i c g}
- Lyctus turkestanicus Lesne, 1935^{i c g}
- Lyctus villosus Lesne, 1911^{i c g b}

Data sources: i = ITIS, c = Catalogue of Life, g = GBIF, b = Bugguide.net
