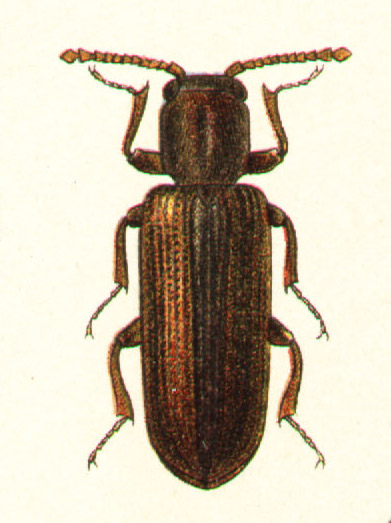

Scientific classification
- Domain: Eukaryota
- Kingdom: Animalia
- Phylum: Arthropoda
- Class: Insecta
- Order: Coleoptera
- Suborder: Polyphaga
- Family: Bostrichidae
- Genus: Lyctus
- Species: L. suturalis

Binomial name
- Lyctus suturalis (Faldermann, 1837)

= Lyctus suturalis =

Species of beetle

Lyctus suturalis is a species of beetle in the family Bostrichidae (formerly in the family Lyctidae, which is now a subfamily of Bostrichidae), present in the Palearctic (including Europe) and the Near East. In Europe, it is only found in Belarus and Ukraine.
