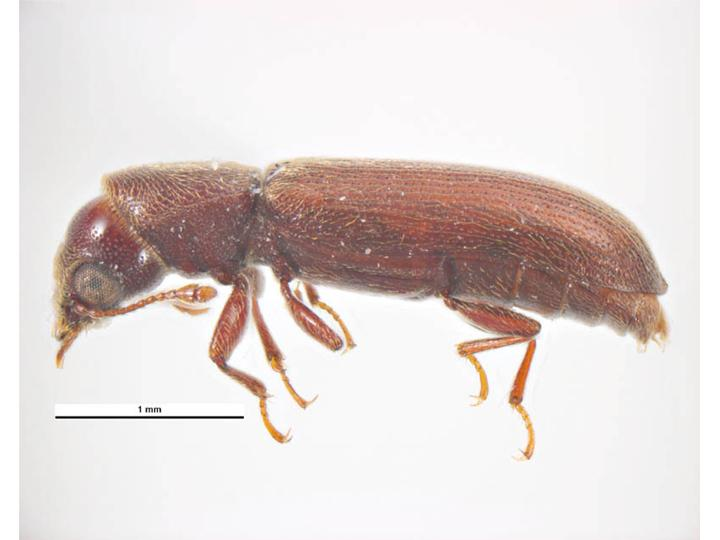

Scientific classification
- Kingdom: Animalia
- Phylum: Arthropoda
- Clade: Pancrustacea
- Class: Insecta
- Order: Coleoptera
- Suborder: Polyphaga
- Family: Bostrichidae
- Genus: Lyctus
- Species: L. africanus

Binomial name
- Lyctus africanus Lesne, 1907

= Lyctus africanus =

Species of beetle

Lyctus africanus, the African powderpost beetle, is a species of powder-post beetle in the family Bostrichidae. It is found in Africa, Europe and Northern Asia (excluding China), North America, and Southern Asia. The mature insects are characterized by their reddish-brown coloration and small size, ranging from 3 to 5 mm. Infestations are generally detected through the activity of the larvae, which excavate hardwood sapwood to extract dietary starch, afterward generating a fine, powdery frass. L. africanus poses a severe economic risk to hardwood products, including timber, plywood, and furniture. It inflicts widespread, gradual damage that frequently goes unnoticed until the wood's structural integrity is already severely compromised.

== Description ==
In 1907, French entomologist, Pierre Lesne was first to document the L. africanus, known as the African powderpost beetle, and is classified under the genus Lyctus, which encompasses multiple species recognized for their wood-digesting abilities. This beetle is identifiable by its slender, cylindrical form, adorned with fine hairs, and features a notable hood-like pronotum, which aids in penetrating wood.

The adults display sexual dimorphism, where males can be recognized by the distinctive apical hairs located at the rear margin of their abdominal segment. Both genders possess a specialized digestive system well-suited for consuming wood. Moreover, the larvae of L. africanus are highly destructive, transforming wood into a fine, powdery frass, which can result in considerable damage to wooden structures and products.

== Distribution ==
Originally, this beetle was entirely endemic to the tropical savannas and forests of Sub-Saharan Africa. However, human globalization—specifically the trade of timber, wooden pallets, and furniture—has accidentally introduced it across the globe. L. africanus beetles are widely distributed throughout the US and Canada, mainly in areas linked to human activities. These insects often travel within furniture and other wooden products, allowing them to migrate significant distances. When they reach a new location, they can infest timber far from their original habitat. Commonly found in an array of wood items such as hardwood flooring, furniture, tool handles, and even in lumberyards, L. africanus typically exhibit year-round presence in buildings, though their activity peaks during warmer months.

== Life cycle ==
The reproductive cycle of Lyctus africanus, a type of powder-post beetle, consists of four stages: egg, larva, pupa, and adult. Depending on the environment, the lifecycle can take as little as 2.5 months under ideal laboratory conditions, to 6–12 months or more in less favorable settings. Females lay eggs in the cracks and pores of wood, averaging about 32 eggs over their lifespan, though this number can increase with high-quality food sources. The incubation period for eggs varies from 2.5 to 13 days, influenced by temperature and humidity.

After hatching, the larvae burrows into the wood, creating narrow tunnels filled with fine frass. This larval stage lasts between 6 and 12 months, depending on environmental factors and the nutritional quality of the wood, with multiple instars feeding on starch-rich sapwood. Pupation occurs within the larval gallery, lasting 7 to 45 days, again affected by temperature and humidity. Adults emerge through small exit holes and can complete several generations annually in tropical climates when conditions are favorable. These beetles prefer wood with a moisture content of 6 to 30 percent, thriving optimally between 10 and 20 percent, and they require wood with at least 3 percent starch for successful egg-laying. They chiefly feed on wood's starchy content, as they lack the ability to digest cellulose or lignin.

== Damage and ecological impact ==
L. africanus primarily infest new wood and are also known to attack bamboo, with most infestations occurring in newly built homes and manufactured wood products. Typically, the wood is already infested at the time of purchase due to improper storage or drying. Common sites of infestation include wood paneling, hardwood floors, and furniture, while softer woods like pine often escape damage.

The signs of damage, such as emergence holes left by adult beetles, may not be immediately visible. Movement near these holes can cause fine, powdery frass to fall, resembling sawdust. The amount of frass can be substantial, potentially bursting through the wood's surface. Importantly, the presence of holes does not always indicate an ongoing infestation, which can sometimes resolve itself over time. Damage occurs slowly, emphasizing the need for careful assessment before taking action.

L. africanus target seasoned hardwoods, such as oak and mahogany, that contain adequate starch. They create considerable economic losses in the wood industry, furniture making, and construction, with costs running into millions annually due to timber devaluation and necessary interventions. While they are a significant pest in the tropical timber trade, affecting imported hardwoods, their environmental impact on native ecosystems is minimal. They do not infest live trees or natural forests, and their establishment in temperate regions is constrained by climate. However, the risk of introduction in protected environments underscores the necessity of phytosanitary measures to prevent spread.

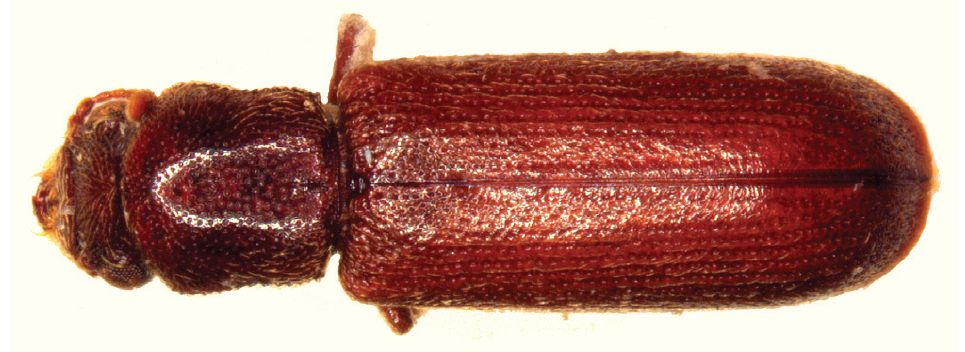
African powderpost beetle, Lyctus africanus
