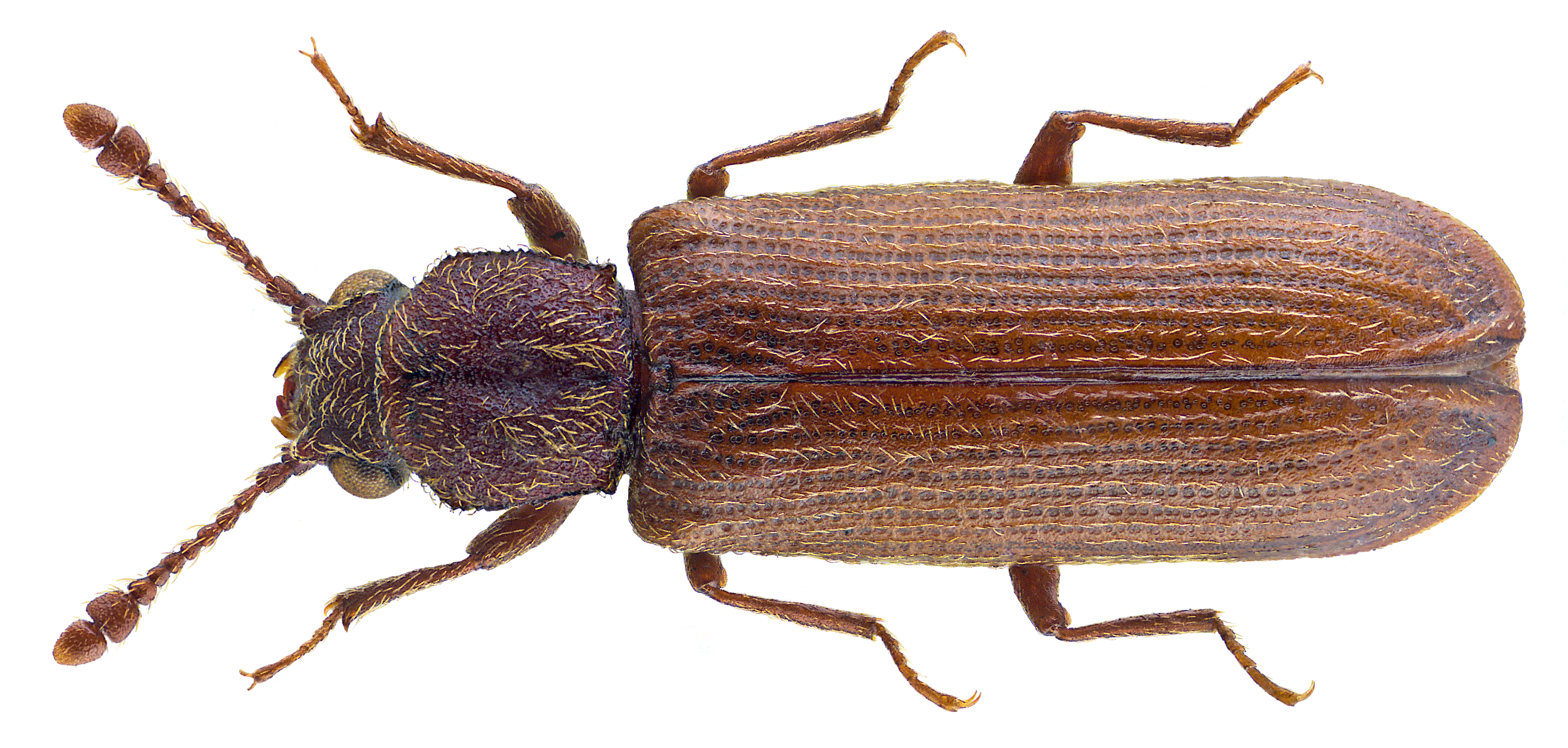

Scientific classification
- Domain: Eukaryota
- Kingdom: Animalia
- Phylum: Arthropoda
- Class: Insecta
- Order: Coleoptera
- Suborder: Polyphaga
- Family: Bostrichidae
- Genus: Lyctus
- Species: L. linearis

Binomial name
- Lyctus linearis (Goeze, 1877)

= Lyctus linearis =

Species of beetle

Lyctus linearis is a species of beetle in the family Bostrichidae. It is a member of the subfamily Lyctinae, the powderpost beetles. It was originally native to tropical regions, but it can now be found worldwide. It is a common pest of wood and wood products and it is transported around the world with them. It is most common in deciduous tree woods.

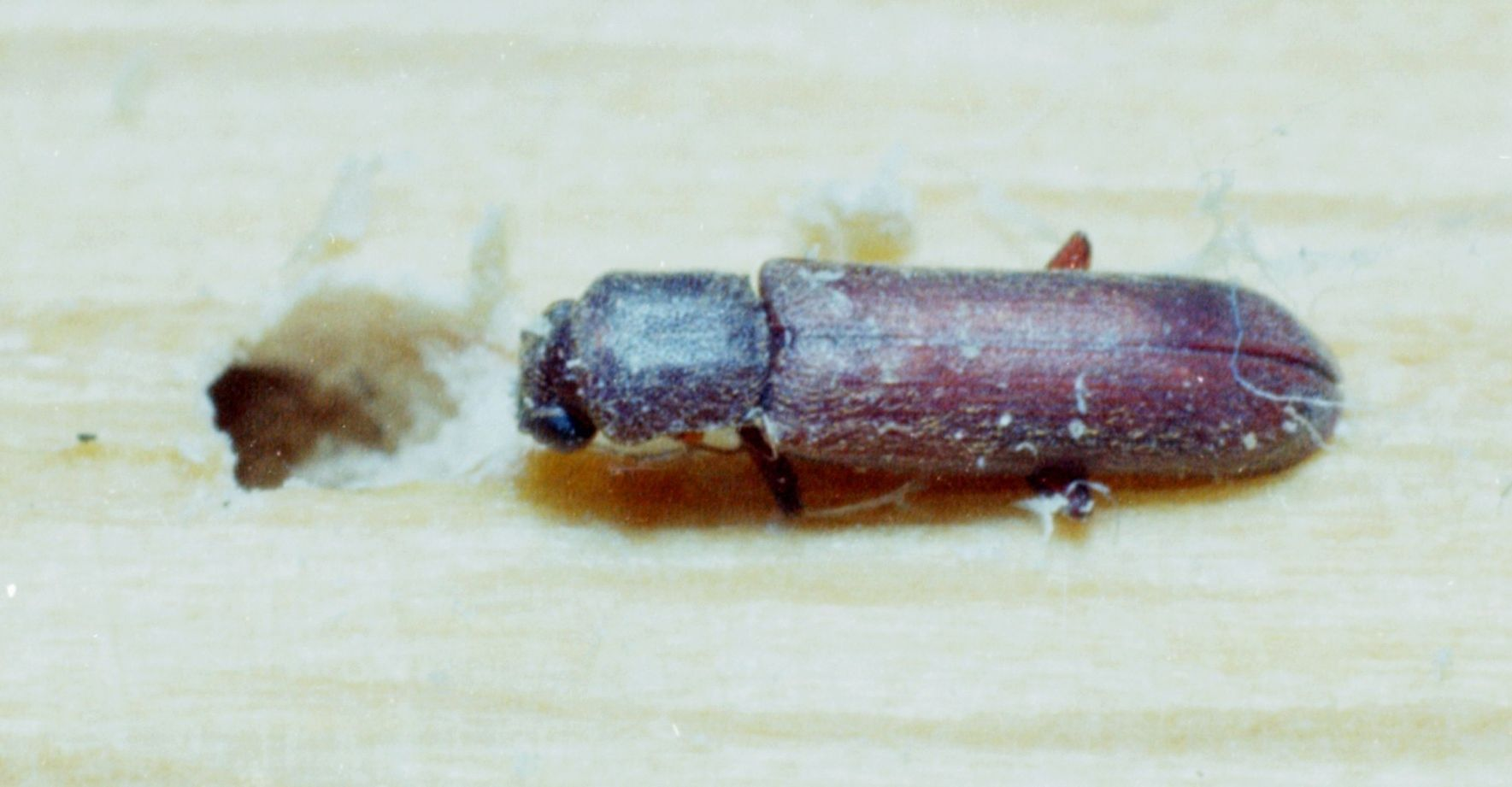
Lyctus linearis by its hole
