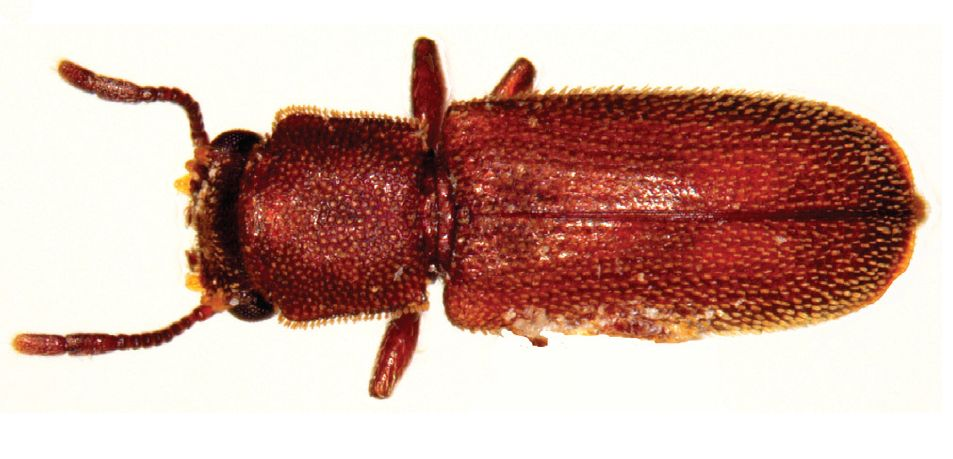
- Dorsal view

Scientific classification
- Kingdom: Animalia
- Phylum: Arthropoda
- Class: Insecta
- Order: Coleoptera
- Suborder: Polyphaga
- Family: Bostrichidae
- Genus: Lyctoxylon
- Species: L. dentatum

Binomial name
- Lyctoxylon dentatum Pascoe, 1866

= Lyctoxylon dentatum =

Species of beetle

Lyctoxylon dentatum is a species of powderpost beetle. A type of woodboring beetle, it was first described in 1866 by Francis Polkinghorne Pascoe. It is native to Asia and has been introduced to Europe, East Africa, and North America.
