= Coccographis =

Scientific classification
- Domain: Eukaryota
- Kingdom: Animalia
- Phylum: Arthropoda
- Class: Insecta
- Order: Coleoptera
- Suborder: Polyphaga
- Family: Bostrichidae
- Genus: Coccographis; Lesne, 1901
- Species: C. nigrorubra

Binomial name
- Coccographis nigrorubra Lesne, 1901

Genus of beetles

Coccographis is a monotypic genus of beetles found in Laos and more generally in Southern Asia. It was first named by Lesne in 1901. Its only recognized species is Coccographis nigrorubra.
