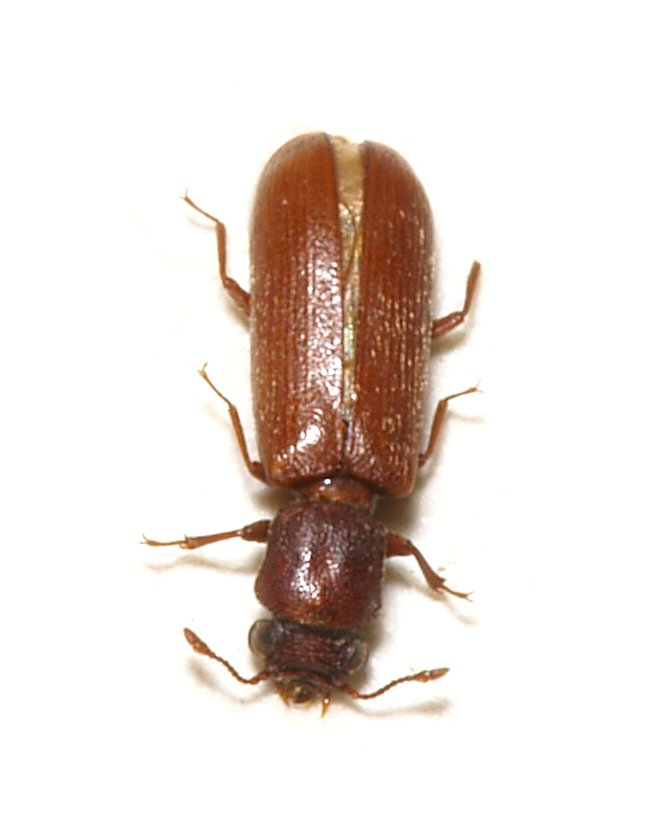

Scientific classification
- Domain: Eukaryota
- Kingdom: Animalia
- Phylum: Arthropoda
- Class: Insecta
- Order: Coleoptera
- Suborder: Polyphaga
- Family: Bostrichidae
- Genus: Lyctus
- Species: L. brunneus

Binomial name
- Lyctus brunneus (Stephens, 1830)

= Lyctus brunneus =

Species of beetle

Lyctus brunneus is a xylophage (wood-eating) insect a species of beetle in the family Bostrichidae. It is a member of the subfamily Lyctinae, the powderpost beetles. It is known commonly as the brown powderpost beetle or brown lyctus beetle.

Today it is distributed worldwide but it was probably originally native to the Neotropical realm.

Like other powderpost beetles, this species lives in wood.
