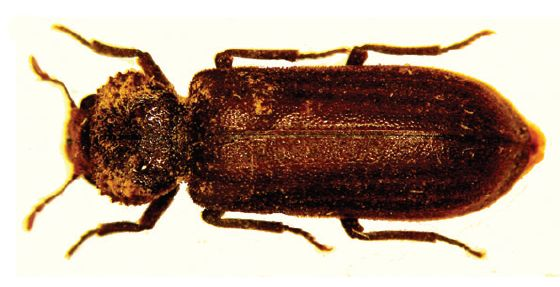
- Apoleon edax

Scientific classification
- Domain: Eukaryota
- Kingdom: Animalia
- Phylum: Arthropoda
- Class: Insecta
- Order: Coleoptera
- Suborder: Polyphaga
- Family: Bostrichidae
- Subfamily: Dysidinae; Lesne, 1921

Genera
- Apoleon; Dysides

= Dysidinae =

Subfamily of beetles

Dysidinae is a subfamily of beetles.
