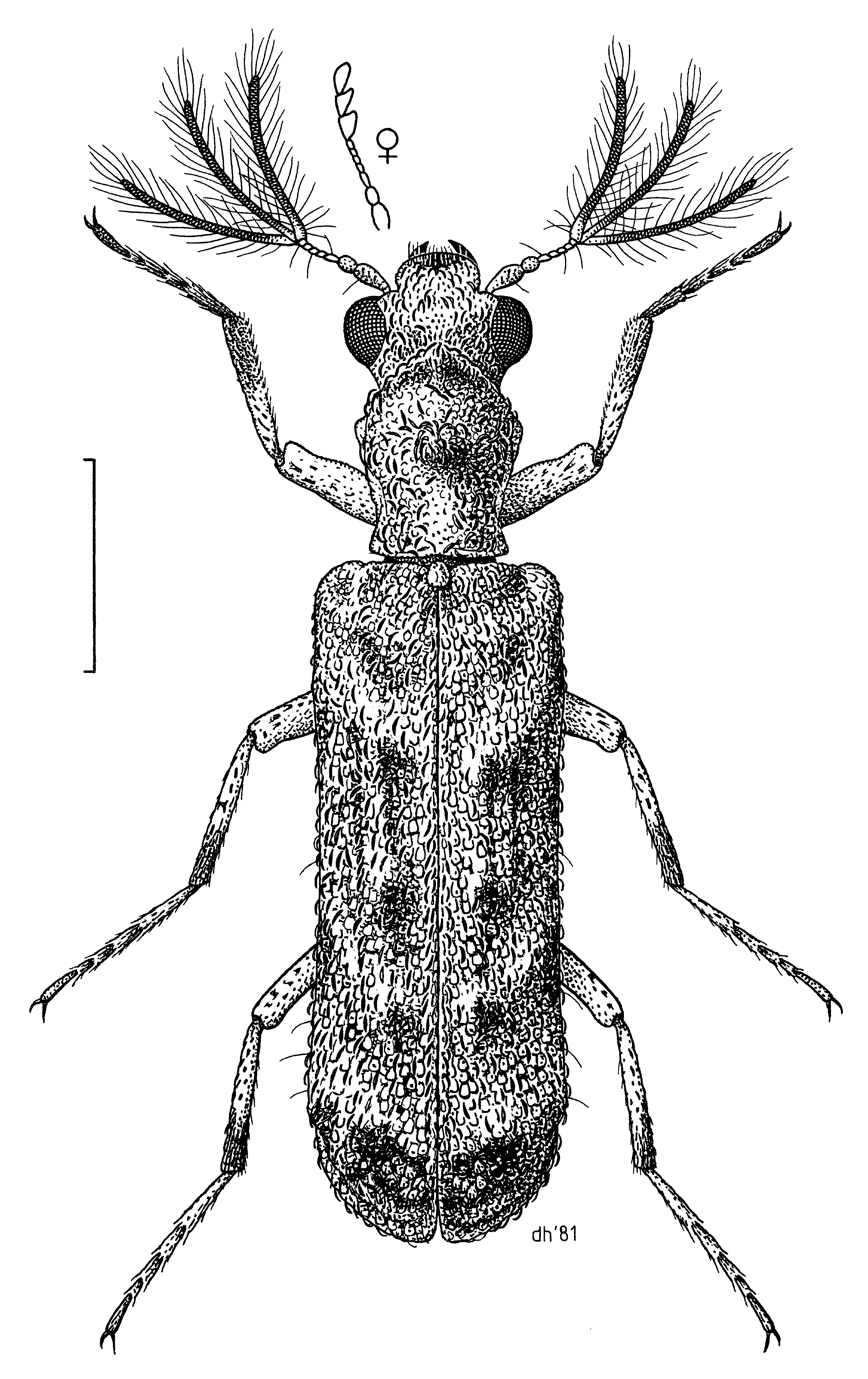
- Euderia squamosa

Scientific classification
- Kingdom: Animalia
- Phylum: Arthropoda
- Clade: Pancrustacea
- Class: Insecta
- Order: Coleoptera
- Suborder: Polyphaga
- Family: Bostrichidae
- Subfamily: Euderiinae; Lesne, 1934
- Genus: Euderia; Broun, 1880
- Species: E. squamosa

Binomial name
- Euderia squamosa Broun, 1880

= Euderia =

Species of beetle

Euderia is a genus of beetles found in New Zealand. It monotypic, being represented by the single species Euderia squamosa.

== Description ==
Euderia squamosa is characterised by protuberances on the elytra and dorsal surface of the pronotum, a 3-segmented antennal club with long flabellate branches for males and shorter segments for females, and protruding eyes. Euderia squamosa adults have been collected by beating Nothofagus branches. Larvae have been found in galleries in moist bark of dead or damaged trees. Roy Crowson provided a detailed description of the bostrichid larva.
