= Clothes moth =

Type of clothes-eating pest

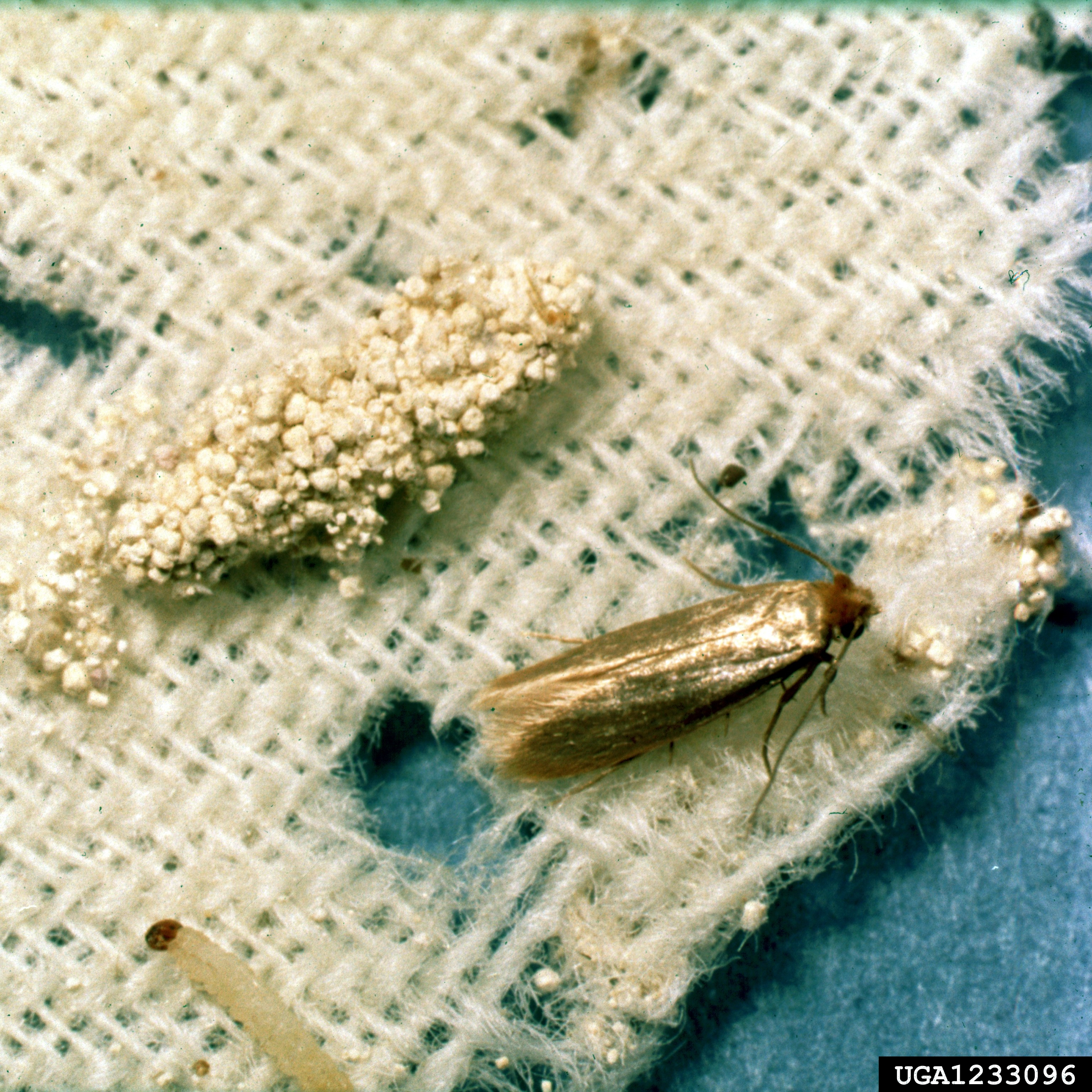
Tineola bisselliella adult on an infested garment

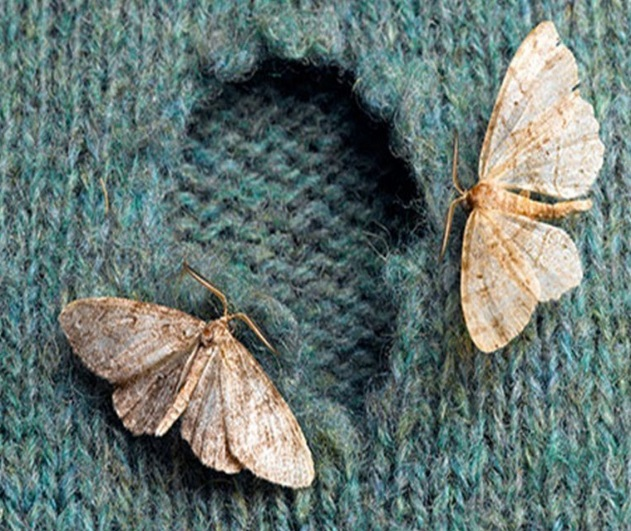
Two bisselliella adults

Clothes moth or clothing moth is the common name for several species of moth considered to be pests, whose larvae eat animal fibres (hairs), including clothing and other fabrics.

These include:

- Tineola bisselliella, the common clothes moth or webbing clothes moth
- Tinea pellionella, the case-bearing clothes moth. Obsolete names are: Phalaena (Tinea) pellionella, Phalaena zoolegella, Tinea demiurga, Tinea gerasimovi, and Tinea pelliomella
- Trichophaga tapetzella, the carpet moth or tapestry moth
- Monopis crocicapitella, pale-backed clothes moth. Particularly destructive of textiles, and found to have increased dramatically in south-west England in 2018.
- Niditinea fuscella, the brown-dotted clothes moth

== Diet and infestation ==
The larvae of clothes moths can eat animal fibres which are not removed by other scavengers, and are capable of consuming and digesting keratin materials that make up silk, wool, fur, and hair. This allows clothes moths to attack human-made garments and textiles which include animal fibres, damaging them and leading to the common name of these pests.

Household-wide infestations can stem from a single textile item, such as a garment or rug, with potential targets besides garments including upholstery, toys, or even taxidermied animals. Discarded fibres found around the home can contribute to infestations as well, such as pet sheddings, hair and fur buildup inside vents and air ducts, or birds' nests built inside some part of a house. Basements and attics are commonly the most heavily affected areas. Larvae can also sometimes act as bookworms, chewing through paper (which they cannot digest for nutrition) to reach book bindings or mold colonies for nourishment.

== Treatment and control ==
Various means are used to repel or kill moths. Pheromone traps are also used both to count and to destroy clothes moths, although these only attract certain species of clothes moth so it is possible to have an active clothes moth infestation without any moths being found on the pheromone traps. Care should be taken to correctly distinguish clothes moths from similar-appearing pantry or Indianmeal moths, so that the appropriate pheromone traps are used.

To control an infestation, all items from the area should be removed and cleaned by using a strong-suctioned vacuum, or soapy water and a washing machine to launder items in hot water for 20–30 minutes to kill eggs.

Among other methods, recommendations to protect heritage collections of textiles include checking the undersides of chairs, moving and vacuum-cleaning all furniture once a month and sealing the discarded vacuum cleaner bag, checking and shaking textiles every month, and regularly checking attics and chimneys. If textiles do become infested, adults, eggs and larvae can be killed by freezing garments in sealed bags for 14 days.
