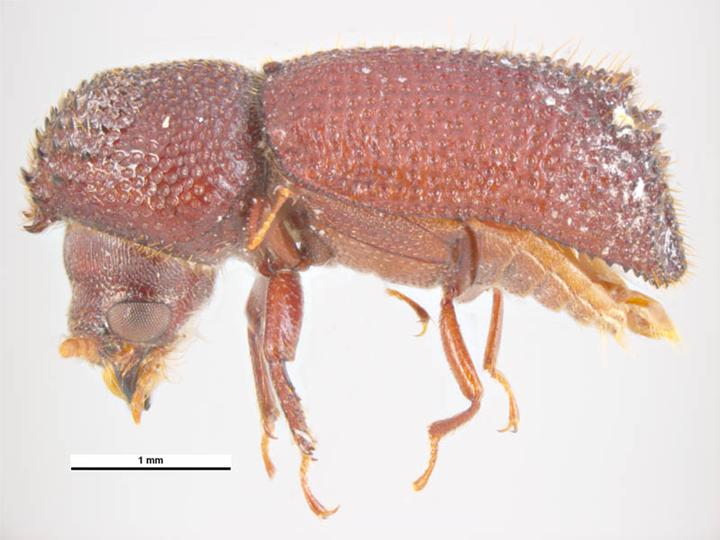
- Dinoderopsis serriger

Scientific classification
- Kingdom: Animalia
- Phylum: Arthropoda
- Clade: Pancrustacea
- Class: Insecta
- Order: Coleoptera
- Suborder: Polyphaga
- Family: Bostrichidae
- Subfamily: Dinoderinae; C.G.Thomson, 1863

Genera
- See text

= Dinoderinae =

Subfamily of beetles

The Dinoderinae comprise a subfamily of the beetle family Bostrichidae. There are five to seven genera. They live in wood. Some species are known as pests of wood-based and other stored products.

Genera include:

- Dinoderopsis
- Dinoderus
- Prostephanus
- Rhizoperthodes
- Rhyzopertha
- Stephanopachys
