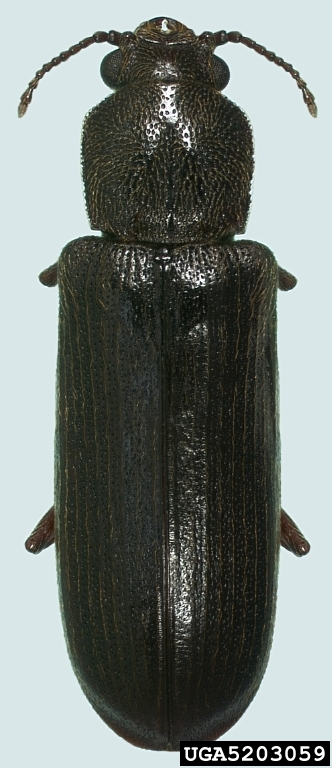

Scientific classification
- Domain: Eukaryota
- Kingdom: Animalia
- Phylum: Arthropoda
- Class: Insecta
- Order: Coleoptera
- Suborder: Polyphaga
- Family: Bostrichidae
- Genus: Lyctus
- Species: L. carbonarius

Binomial name
- Lyctus carbonarius (Waltl, 1832)

Synonyms
- Lyctus planicollis LeConte, 1859

= Lyctus carbonarius =

Species of beetle

Lyctus carbonarius is a wood-boring beetle in the family Bostrichidae (formerly in the family Lyctidae, which is now a subfamily of Bostrichidae), commonly known as the southern lyctus beetle. It is a serious pest of hardwoods including ash, hickory, oak, maple and mahogany and can infest many products in the home including hardwood flooring and structural timbers, plywood, furniture, tool handles, picture frames, baskets and ladders. Timber can be infested in one location and then be transported large distances by ship, after which the beetles can emerge and spread the infestation to new areas.

Lyctus planicollis LeConte, 1859 is considered a synonym of the species of Lyctus carbonarius.

== Description ==
The adult beetle ranges from four to six millimetres in length and is a dark brownish-black. The head is prominent and is not covered by the pronotum. The antennae have eleven segments, the end two being broadened giving a club-like effect. The body is elongated and slightly flattened with the pronotum wider than it is long. The elytra are ridged longitudinally, with double rows of small puncture marks between the ridges. The body is covered by a sparse, short yellowish down.

== Life cycle ==
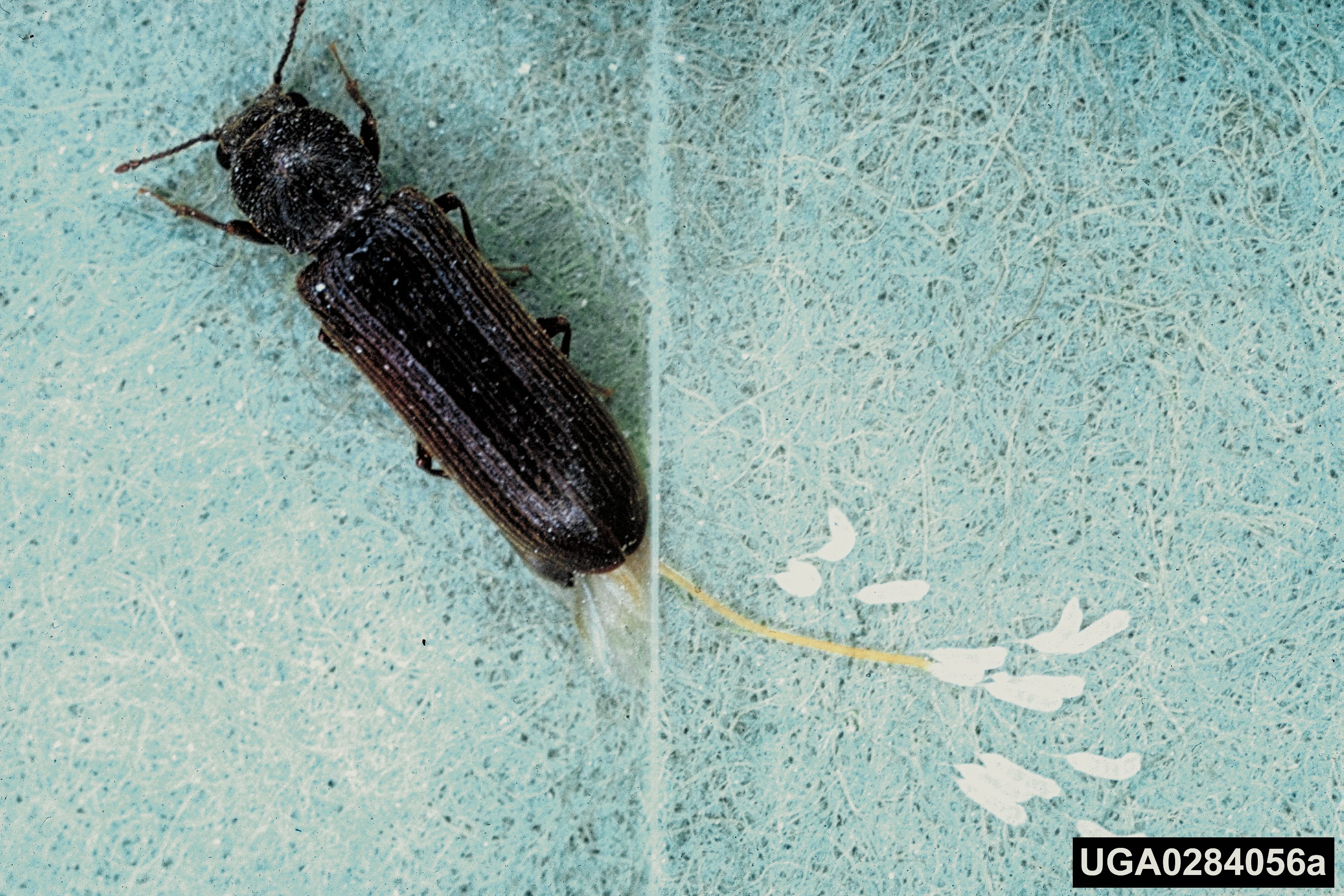
A female laying eggs. Normally the ovipositor would deposit eggs inside the wood.

The female beetle mates soon after emerging in the spring and lays up to fifty eggs over the course of a week. The eggs are white, cylindrical and about one millimetre long. They are laid deep inside holes in wood, either in the tunnels made by emerging adults or in pores, cracks and crevices. The eggs hatch in one to three weeks depending on the temperature.

The larvae are cream-coloured and grow to about seven millimetres long as they tunnel deeper into the wood, leaving behind them the powderlike frass of wood debris that gives them their common name. They feed on the starchy content of the wood as they are unable to digest cellulose. Young larvae chew their way along the grain of sapwood but older larvae may tunnel across the grain. They may come near to the surface but do not break through. When the larvae are ready to pupate, they build pupal chambers close to the surface.

Metamorphosis takes from twelve days to a month. The adults break out of the pupae and chew their way to the surface leaving behind circular holes. The little wisps of sawdust that fall from these may be the first sign of an infestation. The adult beetles are nocturnal and may live for up to three months. The whole life cycle takes about a year but can vary from six months to four years. In heated buildings development occurs quickly but in adverse environments, growth is slower and the larvae may hibernate in colder regions. This is the main reason for the variability in the length of the life cycle.

== Damage ==
The larval stage is responsible for nearly all the damage done by the beetle. They feed on many of the various hardwoods used in wood paneling, door and window frames, furniture, baskets, hardwood trim and flooring in homes. Only sapwood is attacked. Infestation usually occurs prior to construction of the article. Varnished, painted or polished surfaces are not normally susceptible to attack but the female beetle may still lay her eggs in empty tunnels created by previous beetle occupants. Subfloors, joists and rafters are usually made of pine or other softwood and generally escape infestation. Imported tropical hardwoods may be heavily infested because of poor drying and storage practices before shipment.
