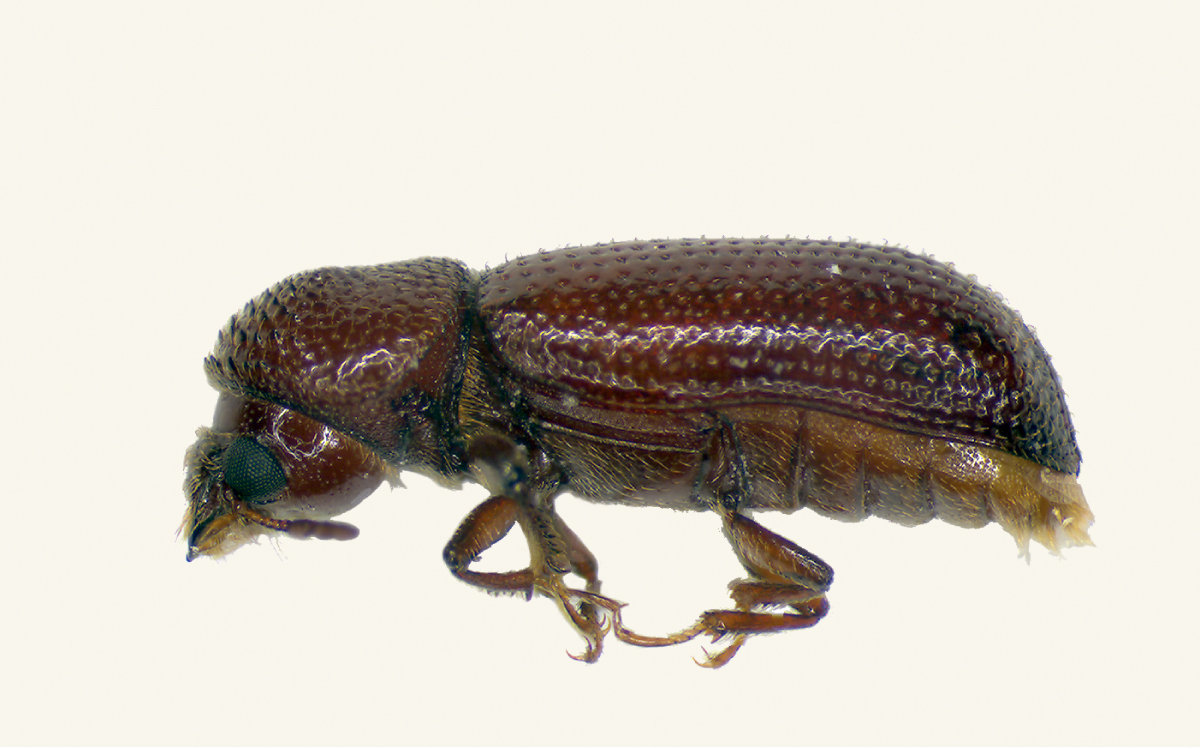

Scientific classification
- Kingdom: Animalia
- Phylum: Arthropoda
- Class: Insecta
- Order: Coleoptera
- Suborder: Polyphaga
- Family: Bostrichidae
- Genus: Rhyzopertha; Stephens, 1830
- Species: R. dominica

Binomial name
- Rhyzopertha dominica (Fabricius, 1792)

Synonyms
- Synodendron dominicum Fabricius, 1792; Synodendron pusillum Fabricius, 1798; Sinodendron dominicum Fabricius, 1801; Sinodendron pusillum Fabricius, 1801; Rhyzopertha pusilla Stephens, 1830; Rhizopertha pusilla Bach, 1852; Rhizopertha dominica Lesne, 1896; Dinoderus pusillus Horn, 1878; Ptinus piceus Marsham, 1802; Ptinus fissicornis Marsham, 1802; Apate rufa Hope, 1845; Apate pusilla Fairmaire, 1850; Apate frumentaria Nördlinger, 1855; Bostrichus moderatus Walker, 1859; Rhizopertha rufa Waterhouse, 1888

= Rhyzopertha =

Genus of beetles

Rhyzopertha is a monotypic genus of beetles in the family Bostrichidae, the false powderpost beetles. The sole species, Rhyzopertha dominica, is known commonly as the lesser grain borer, American wheat weevil, Australian wheat weevil, and stored grain borer. It is a beetle commonly found within store bought products and pest of stored cereal grains located worldwide. It is also a major pest of peanuts. The first documentation of wheat infestation by R. dominica was observed in Australia. R. dominica are usually reddish brown to dark brown in coloration, vary in sizes, elongated and cylindrical.

== Identification ==
The average R. dominica are 2.1–3.0 millimetres (11/128–15/128 in) in length. Their body displays a reddish brown coloration with 11 antennal segments and a 3-segmented antennal club. The pronotum is located near the base of the body with no depressions. In addition, the basal part of the pronotum has a wrinkled appearance. Distinct tubercles on the R. dominica are found on the anterior margin, but appear to be slightly apart at the median. Moreover, it has clear elytral strioles that are angularly rounded at the apex, and short, yellowish, bent setae. Externally there are no major recognizable differences between male and female adults of R. dominica. Rhyzopertha dominica is morphologically superficially similar to some other species within the family Bostrichidae, particularly these in the subfamily Dinoderinae.

== Distribution and diversity ==
The geographical origin of R. dominica is still uncertain, however the scientific community has agreed that the Indian subcontinent is its most probable native home, as the region is inhabited by other bostrichid species. Currently, R. dominica has a worldwide distribution, especially in warmer temperate climate zones, between latitude 40° North and South from the equator. It is predominantly found in forested and grain storage environments. As such, human interaction has aided in the wide spread of R. dominica through the commercial transportation of grain. A testament to their inhabitation of grain is the acquisition of the name “Australian Wheat Weevil”, symbolizing their predominant infestation of wheat in Australia.

== Taxonomy ==
Rhyzopertha dominica is from the family Bostrichidae, commonly referred to as auger or powderpost beetles. Currently the family consists of 550 bostrichid species, of which 77 of them are found in North America. Bostrichids can be distinguished from other beetles due to their rasp-like pronotum, 5-segmented tarsi and straight antennae with 3-3 segments. The genus Rhyzopertha is monotypic, consisting of only R. dominica. Further classification of this genus places it within the subfamily Dinoderinae.

== Diet ==
There are various substrates that make up the resources and diet for the R. dominica. This includes grains, such as rice, wheat, sorghum, oat, pearl millet, malt barley from the family Poaceae, and chickpeas, peanuts and beans from the family Leguminosae. R. dominica seems to be preadapted for feeding on dry grains. It feeds on the whole grain in both larval and adult stages.

== Courtship behaviour and reproduction ==
Rhyzopertha dominica follows a 4-stage life cycle: egg, larval, pupal, and adult. The mating behaviour in the R. dominica follows within 24 hour after the individual ecloses from the pupal stage. The females do not display any courtship behavior such as initiation of mating or attempt to attract male beetles. In some instances, the males will attempt to mate with other males, whereas this type of interaction is absent in females. Female attraction to the male occurs upon physical contact, whereby the close proximity allows for the olfactory senses to detect the male produced pheromones. The pheromones are also responsible for the attraction between male beetles. Stimulation from the pheromones is characterized (in both male-to-male and male-to-female interaction) by an excited and rapid walking motion; the head, thorax, and antennae are extended forward and up, in the direction of the pheromone source. When they are around a pheromone source, the beetles walk around with their antennae extended and they actively palpate the abdominal area. The males will initiate a palp mediated mating response and mount the beetle if it were a female. This occurs after he touches his maxillary palp to the tips of her elytra. While mounting the female, the male moves to the posterior dorsal surface. The male walks forward and taps lightly on top of the female's elytra and thorax with his palpi. Contact with the vagina is made when the last sternite of the male beetle is lowered and the aedeagus protrudes to the vagina. Once the male is firmly mounted, copulation has been achieved. Copulation lasts for 2 hours and can occur multiple times in R. dominica, as females require more than one mating to fertilize effectively all the eggs produced during her lifetime. Externally there are no major recognizable differences between male and female adults of R. dominica. A reported minor difference is the last ventral abdominal sternite of the female, seen as pale yellow as compared to the uniformly brown males.

== Infestation ==
Maximum reproductive success is achieved on dry grains, such as wheat, explaining the infestation issue it causes from residual insect populations in grain stores and immigration from outside. These products, which are stored in bulk, are understood to be human created ecosystems with a stable microclimate suited to fit the pest's needs. These ecosystems allow females to deposit their eggs loosely within the grain mass and allows the first larva to enter the kernel. The larva after undergoing the fourth larval instar, will emerge from the kernel as an adult. The duration of development takes up to 35 days, with optimal conditions of 28 °C (82 °F) and 50% humidity. Once it reaches adulthood, they have difficulty moving on flat and smooth surfaces, due to reduced friction, and as a result are unable to access food. Therefore, the grain mass is the most suitable for them due to their diet of grain based products, which can facilitate the appearance of more fungi and pests. At the adult life stage, R. dominica flies to the surface of the grain mass and slowly works its way downward through the grain mass as far as 12 metres (39 ft), further than other grain beetles. Together with the deep movement into the grain mass and the cryptic feeding on the kernels, it can becomes difficult to detect initial R. dominica infestation. Over time, because of R. dominica infestation, a sweetish odor is left within the infested grain as a result of the aggregation pheromones produced by males. A large amount of frass is also produced from adult feeding activities, containing ovoid granules of undigested endosperm mixed with a finer flour, larvae exuvae, feces, fragments of immature insects, and various by products affecting the overall quality of the grain. Adult and larval stages of R. dominica feed on the germ and endosperm. This degree of feeding can vary with the age of the beetles, with the highest amount of feeding done by young adult beetles.

== Natural enemies ==
Various predaceous organisms are capable of coexisting with R. dominica, such as mites, bugs, and parasitoids that are also found infesting stored grain. Two hemipterans, found in the family Anthocoridae, four mites from the families Acarophenacidae, Pediculoidae, and Cheyletidae have all found to attack R. dominica in storage, including five parasitoids from the families Bethylidae and Pteromalidae. All of these predators attacked the eggs or larval stage rather than the adult or pupal stage. Mortality of R. dominica can also occur because of nematodes, fungi, protozoans and bacteria.

== Flight ==
The flight capacity of R. dominica has not been researched thoroughly, however, R. dominica is capable of flight. This, aside from human intervention, permits their widespread spatial distribution between isolated resources. They boast an impressive flying capacity as it has been observed to fly over 5 kilometres (3 mi) from an infested location. Moreover, winds and wind drift can substantially assist in dispersal. The attraction to pheromones can additionally aid them to fly upwind to the pheromone sources, possibly stimulated by pheromone molecules, without which dispersal is reduced.

== Control ==
=== Physical ===
Commercial and agricultural methods are being implemented to manage infestation and pest control of R. dominica. Approaches includes minimizing pest migration and build-up within grain storage areas, through thorough cleaning of the equipment before harvest, sealing storage, spraying bins and units, and cleaning up any grain spills. Close monitoring of the temperature in storage areas is a crucial step of managing, as it can influence the insect population. Harvested wheat temperatures ranging from 27 to 34 °C (81 to 93 °F) is optimal for insect reproduction and growth. R. dominica are more vulnerable to the cold than other grain pests. Temperatures below 15 °C (59 °F) are unfavourable for R. dominica to maintain their bodily activities. To compensate, they become dormant, but this greatly increases their susceptibility to death at temperatures of 2 °C (36 °F) or lower. Thus, aeration or grain drying, where grain is mechanically ventilated, can also be used to manage infestation through the maintenance of low temperatures in storage areas. R. dominica cannot be completely controlled solely with aeration. Although it is recommended for quality of grains, feasible and effective in reducing insect growth rate, damage from fungi and moisture.

=== Biological ===
Predation by natural enemies of R. dominica, arthropod species, are insufficient methods of biological control due to their low numbers as compared to fecundity of R. dominica. Moreover, the natural predators and parasitoids can fall prey themselves to other types of organisms, which is quite disadvantageous. This in tandem with their deep burrowing feature, which allows them to successfully escape predation and risk, allows for effective R. dominica proliferation.

=== Chemical ===
Insecticide grain protectants worldwide are also ineffective for R. dominica management. Many of these protectants are either not effective or the pest has developed resistance to them. The protectant include organophosphorus insecticides such as chlorpyrifos methyl, fenitrothion, pirimiphos methyl and malathion. When infestations become severe, fumigation is a suggested form of control. The fumigant phosphine is key to controlling R. dominica since it targets all insect life stages, is easy to utilize, effective, feasible, and is a residue-free tactic. Unfortunately, due to active dispersal, R. dominica also actively spreads its resistance genes. Other alternatives such as the use of ozone as a fumigant is also being tested on immature stages, larvae or pupae, which are more prone to being effected as compared to adults. Aside from the evolution of resistance, the internal feeding technique of R. dominica confers protection from potential insecticides by creating safe spaces and shelter within the grain mass. Further studies suggest that fumigants are not the only method of detecting and pest management implemented in the grain industry. Research shows that soft x-ray methods are also being used to identify potential infested wheat kernels. Despite all efforts to manage R. dominica, they remain a detrimental pest in the production of wheat, rice and pasta.

== Gallery ==
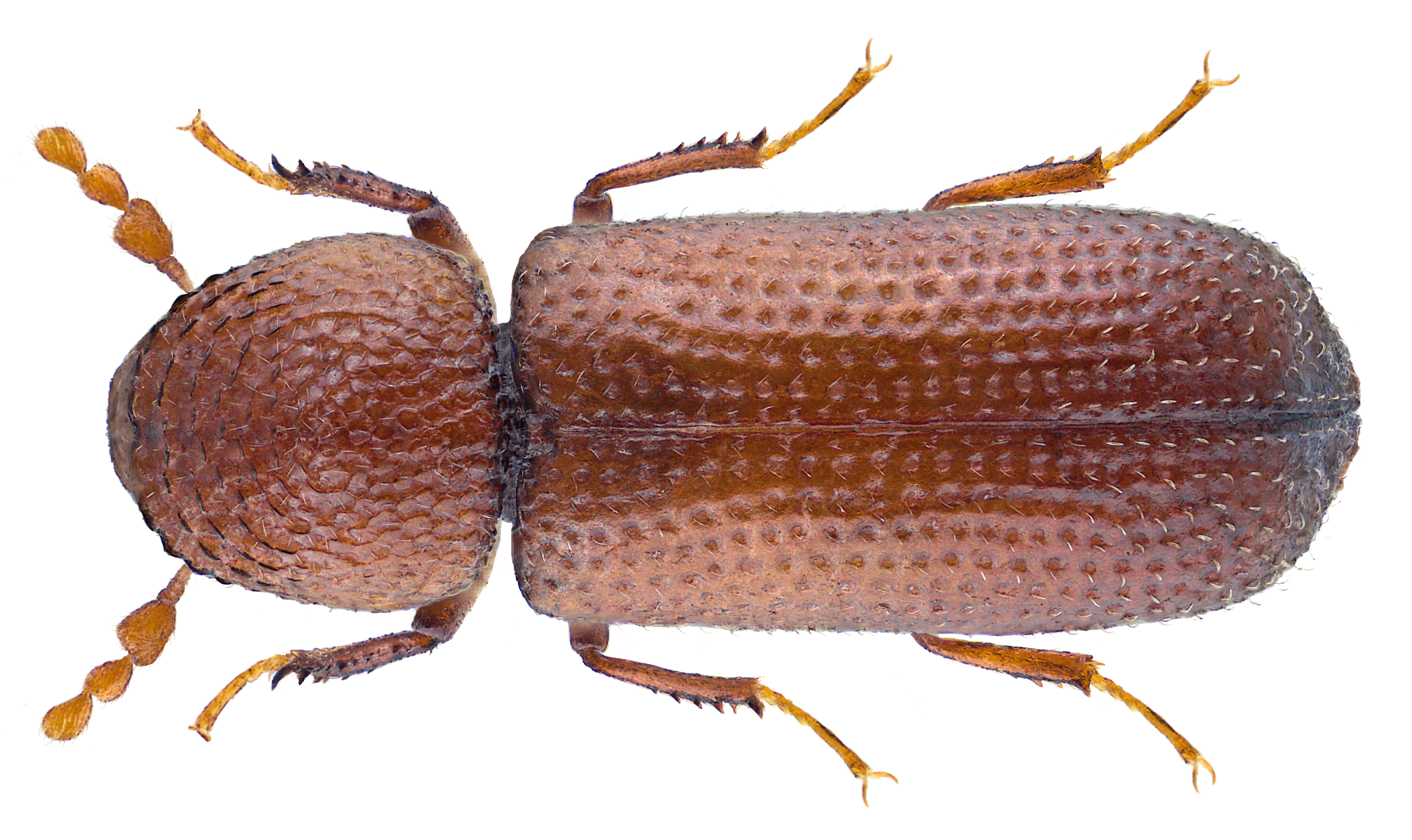
Rhyzopertha dominica (Lesser Grain Borer)

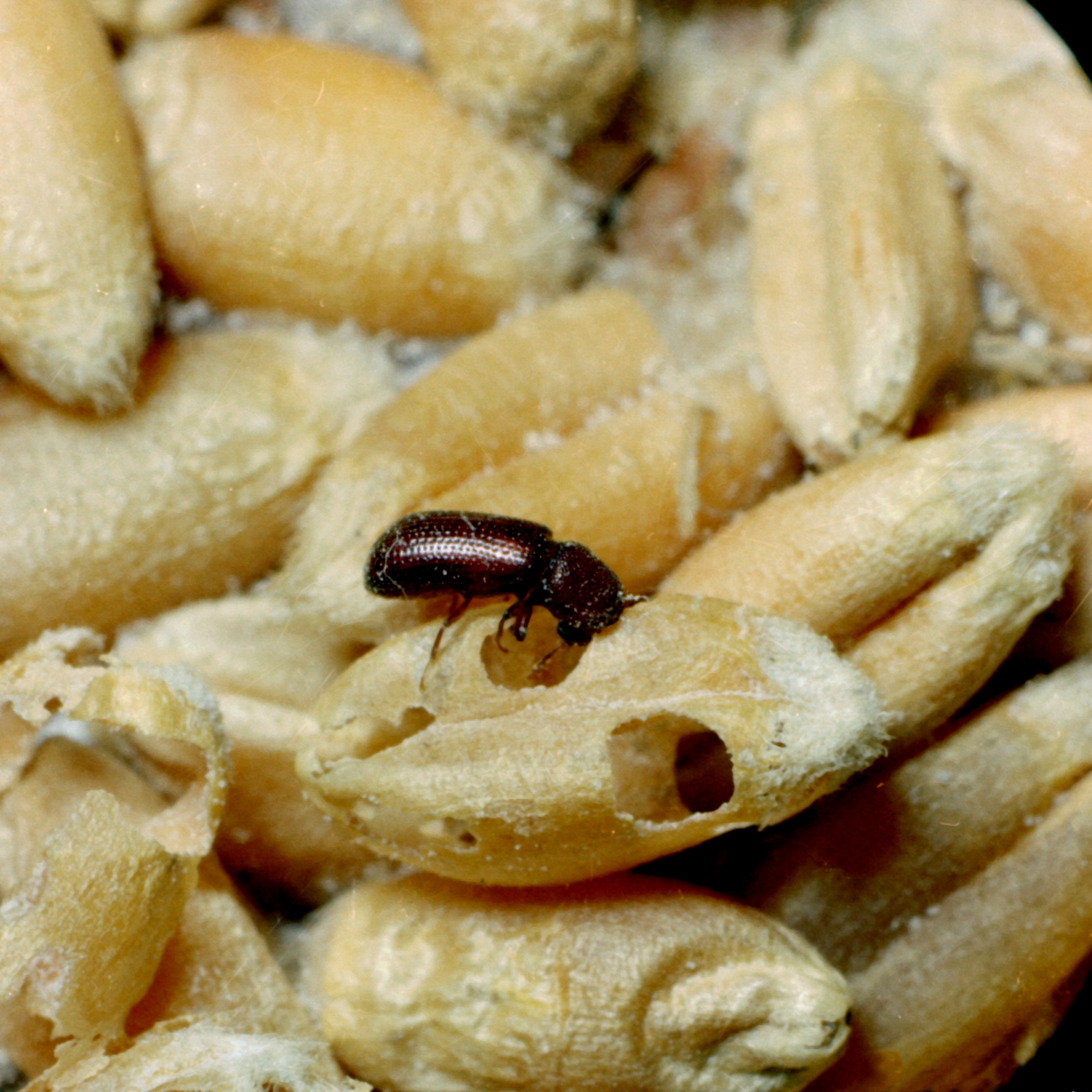
The lesser grain borer, "Rhyzopertha dominica", on wheat

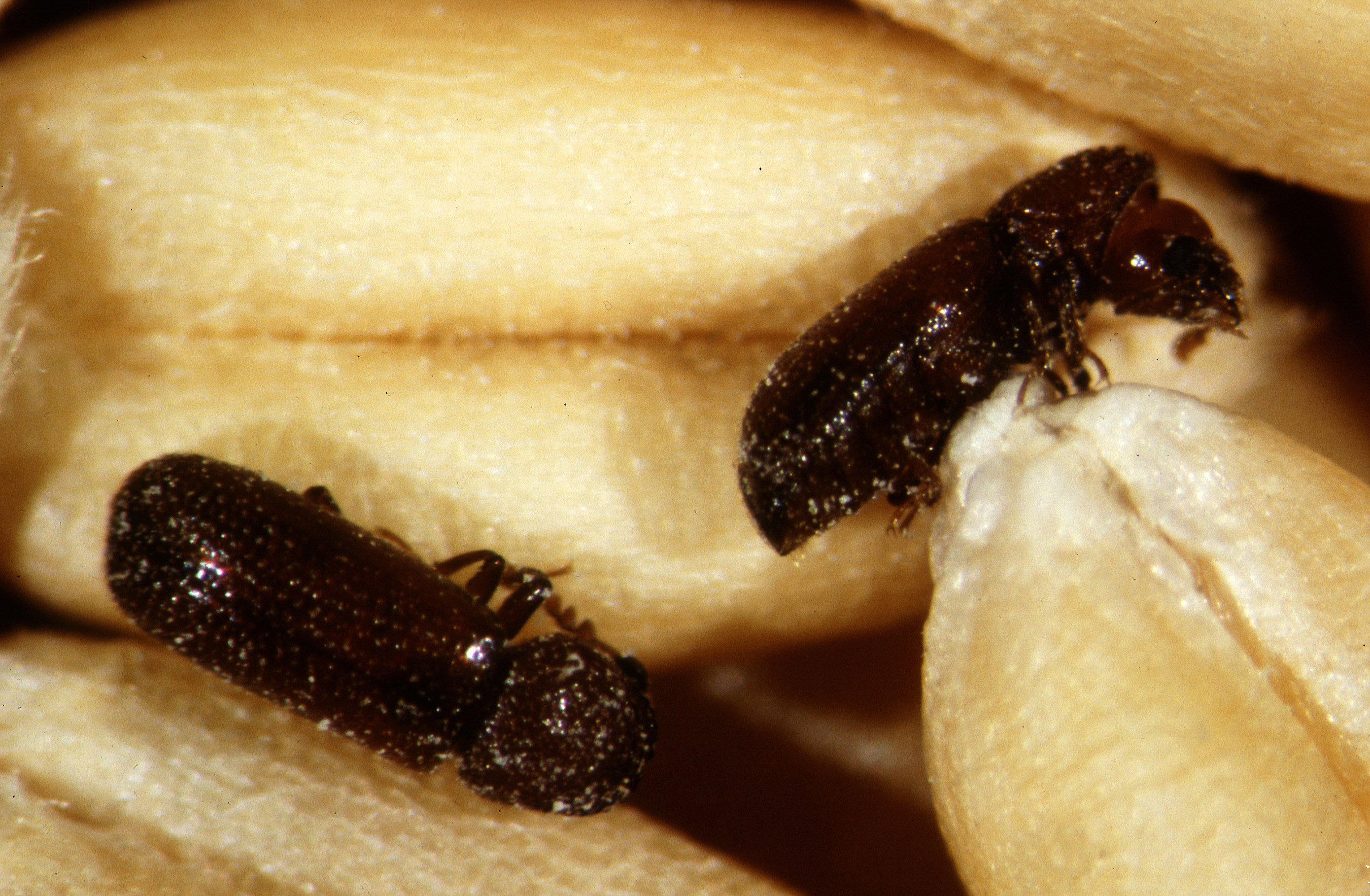
Rhyzopertha dominica (Lesser grain borer)

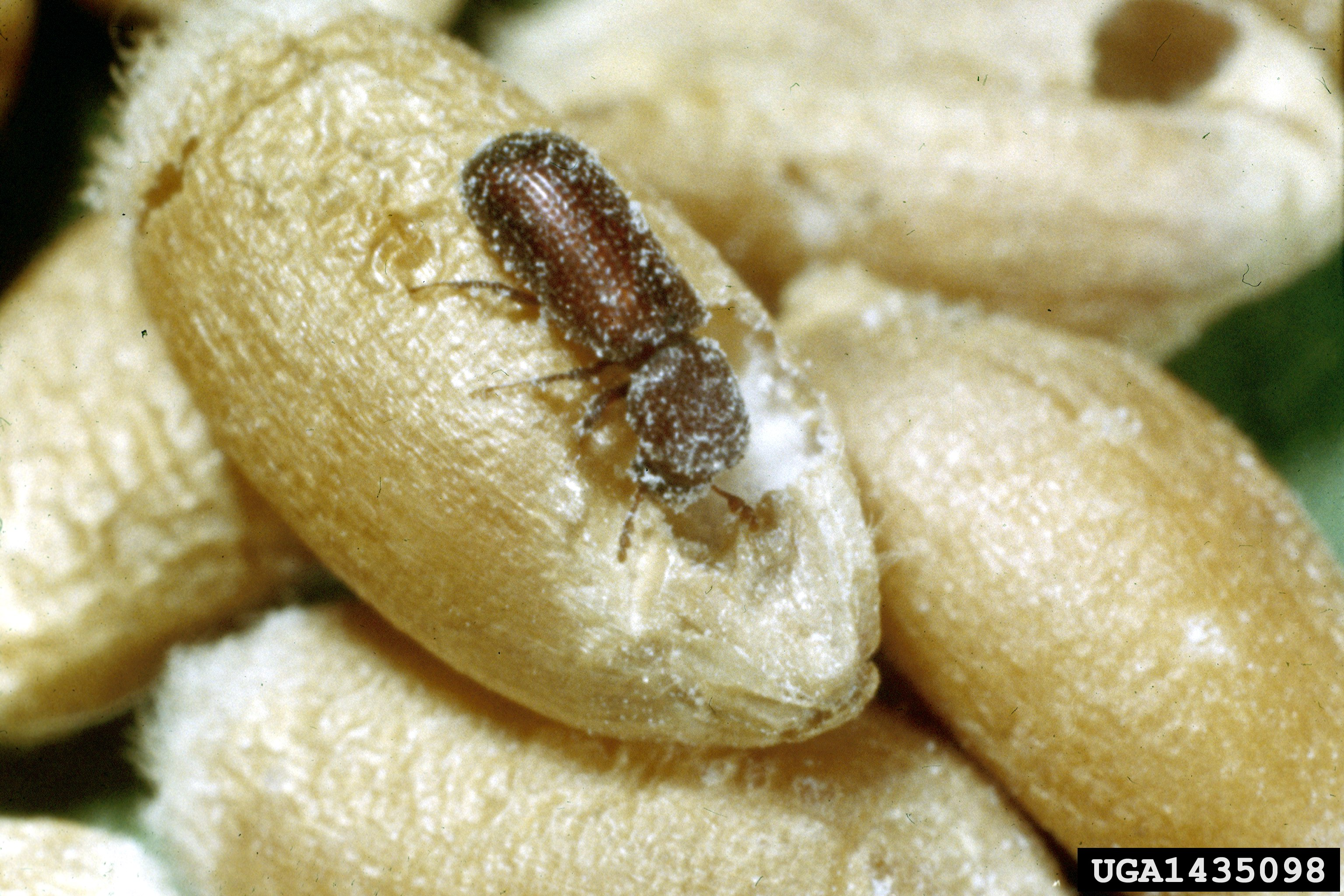
Rhyzopertha dominica from USA
