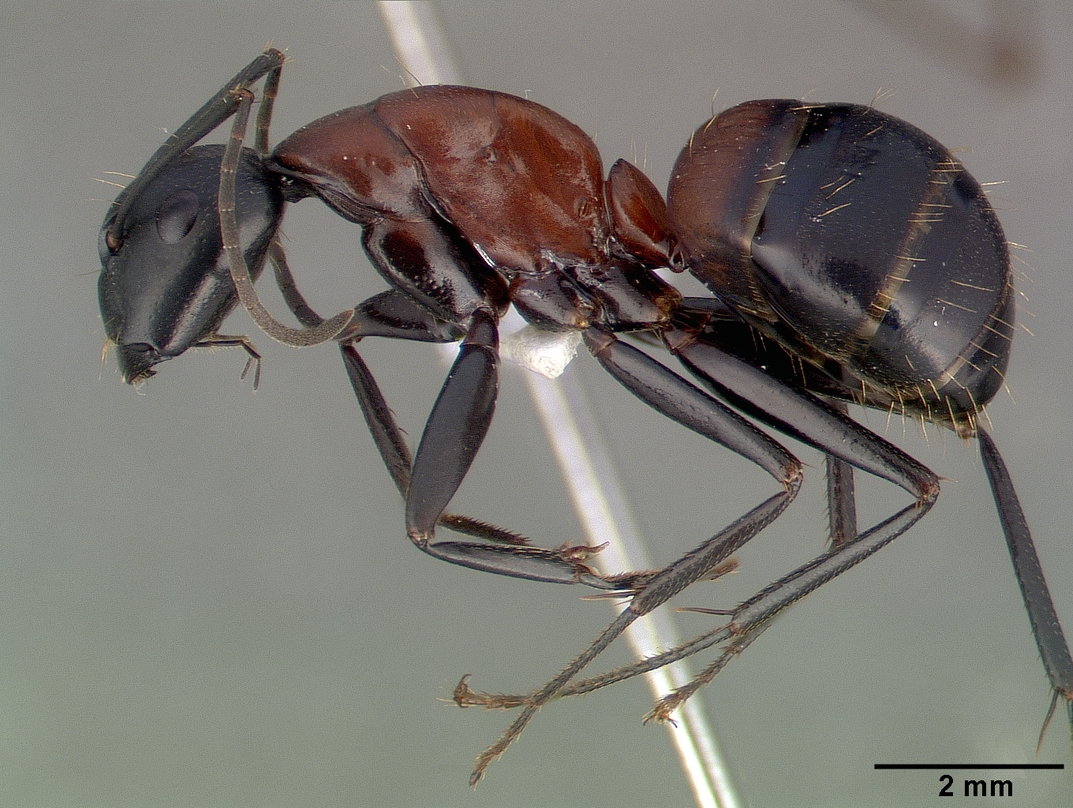

Scientific classification
- Domain: Eukaryota
- Kingdom: Animalia
- Phylum: Arthropoda
- Class: Insecta
- Order: Hymenoptera
- Family: Formicidae
- Subfamily: Formicinae
- Genus: Camponotus
- Subgenus: Camponotus
- Species: C. obscuripes

Binomial name
- Camponotus obscuripes Mayr, 1879

Synonyms
- C. herculeanus obscuripes; C. ligniperda obscuripes

= Camponotus obscuripes =

Species of ant

Camponotus obscuripes is a species of carpenter ant native to Japan, Sakhalin, the Kuril Islands, Jeju Island, and possibly other parts of East Asia and Russia.
