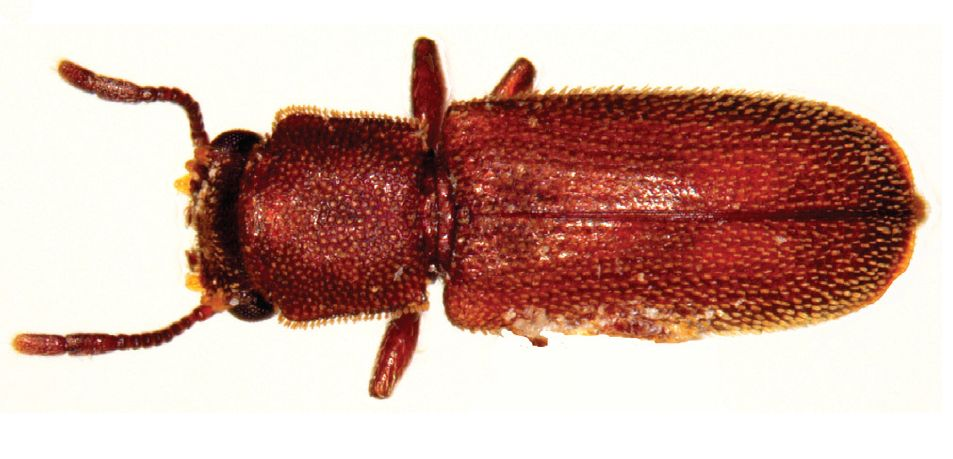
- Dorsal view of Lyctoxylon dentatum

Scientific classification
- Kingdom: Animalia
- Phylum: Arthropoda
- Clade: Pancrustacea
- Class: Insecta
- Order: Coleoptera
- Suborder: Polyphaga
- Family: Bostrichidae
- Subfamily: Lyctinae; Billberg, 1820

Tribes and genera
- Lyctini; Lyctoxylon; Lyctus; Minthea; Trogoxylini; Trogoxylon

= Powderpost beetle =

Subfamily of beetles

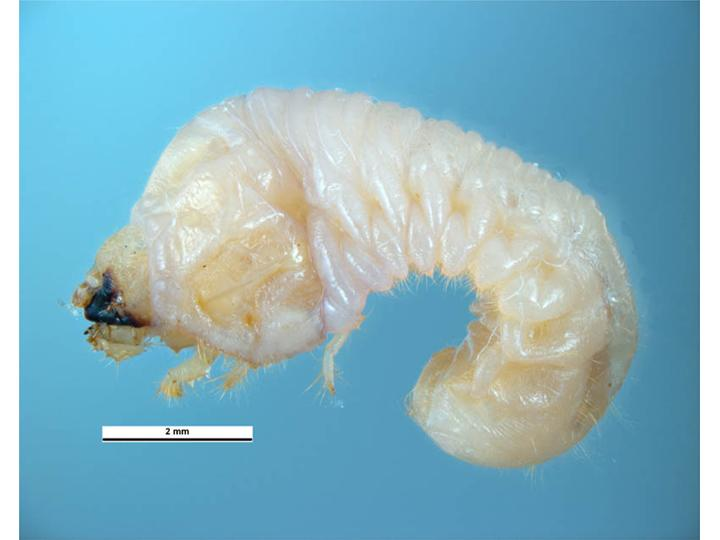
A typical C-shaped larva of a beetle in the superfamily Bostrichoidea

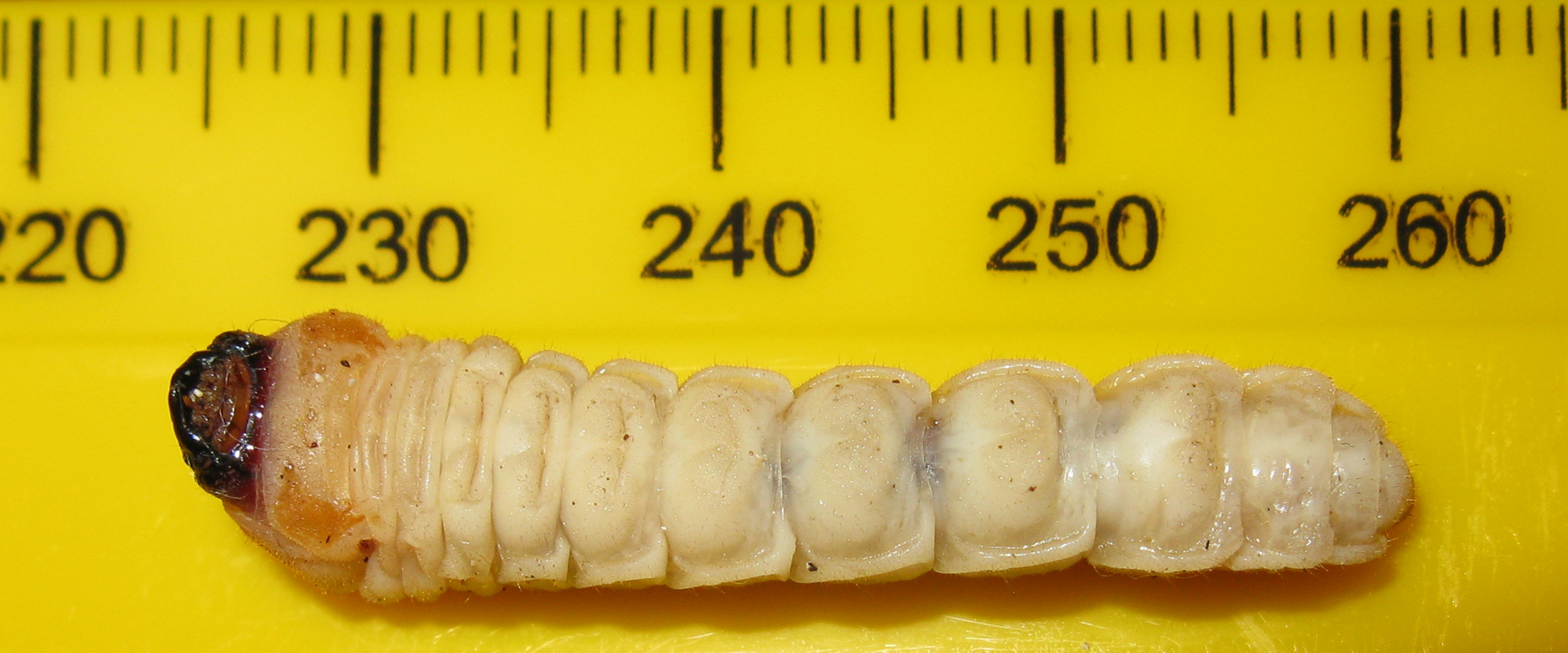
A typical straight larva of a beetle in the family Cerambycidae, unrelated to the Bostrichoidea

Powderpost beetles are a group of seventy species of woodboring beetles classified in the insect subfamily Lyctinae. These beetles, along with spider beetles, death watch beetles, common furniture beetles, skin beetles, and others, make up the superfamily Bostrichoidea. While most woodborers have a large prothorax, powderpost beetles do not, making their heads more visible. In addition to this, their antennae have two-jointed clubs. They are considered pests and attack deciduous trees, over time reducing the wood to a powdery dust. The damage caused by longhorn beetles (family Cerambycidae) is often confused with that of powderpost beetles, but the two groups are unrelated. The larvae of the Cerambycidae are white, straight and generally flat-headed, whereas those of the Bostrichidae are white and C-shaped.

== Name ==
The term "powderpost" comes from the fact that the larvae of these beetles feed on wood and, given enough time, can reduce it to a mass of fine powder. Because of this behavior, they are considered pests. These beetles can survive in colder climates.

== Life cycle ==
Powderpost beetle larvae spend months or years inside wood while developing, feeding mainly on the starch content. Their presence is only apparent when they emerge as adults, leaving behind pinhole-sized openings, often called "shot holes". They may also leave piles of powdery frass below. Shot holes normally range in diameter from 1/32 inch (0.79 mm) to 1/8 inch (3.2 mm), depending on the species of beetle. If wood conditions are right, female beetles may lay their eggs and re-infest the wood, continuing the cycle for generations.

== Target materials ==
Powderpost beetles feed on deciduous trees, including certain hardwoods or softwoods depending on the species. Some hardwoods are naturally immune if they have low starch content or if their pore diameters are too small for the female beetle's ovipositor to lay her eggs in.

Wood preservatives can be used to prevent beetle infestation. Common treatments may use borate, and frequently structural fumigation.

Items that can be infested by powderpost beetles include wooden tools or tool handles, frames, furniture, gun stocks, books, toys, bamboo, flooring, musical instruments, and structural timbers. One instance of a 2023 American-made Fender guitar containing powderpost beetle larvae was reported in 2026, after the larvae had tunneled their way out and left small holes in the ash body.
