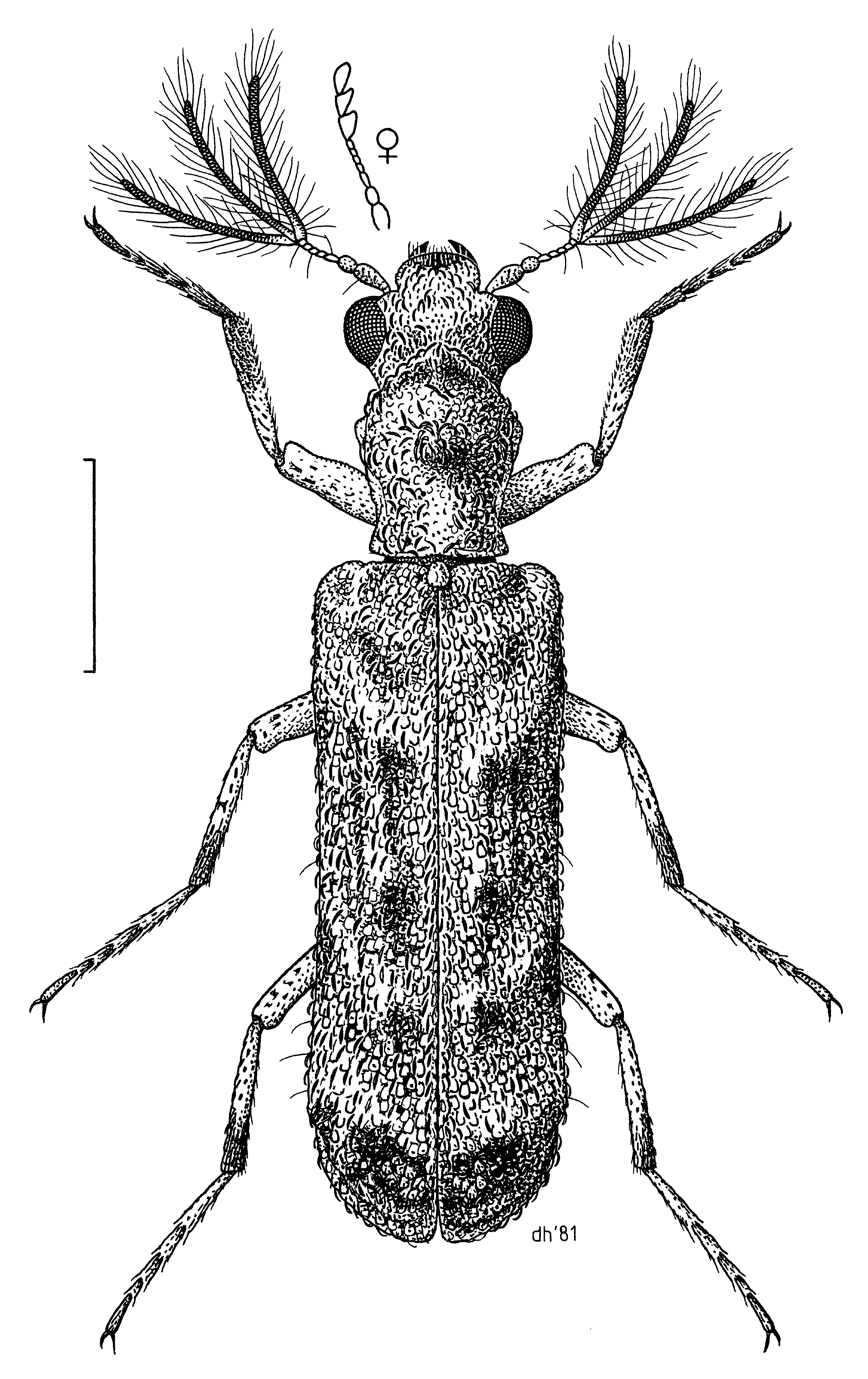
- Euderia squamosa

Scientific classification
- Kingdom: Animalia
- Phylum: Arthropoda
- Clade: Pancrustacea
- Class: Insecta
- Order: Coleoptera
- Suborder: Polyphaga
- Infraorder: Bostrichiformia
- Superfamily: Bostrichoidea
- Family: Bostrichidae; Latreille, 1802

Subfamilies
- Bostrichinae; Dinoderinae; Dysidinae; Euderiinae; Lyctinae; Polycaoninae; Psoinae

Diversity
- About 700 species

= Bostrichidae =

Bostrichidae Temporal range: Cenomanian–Recent

Family of beetles

The Bostrichidae are a family of beetles with more than 700 described species. They are commonly called auger beetles, false powderpost beetles, or horned powderpost beetles.

== Anatomy ==
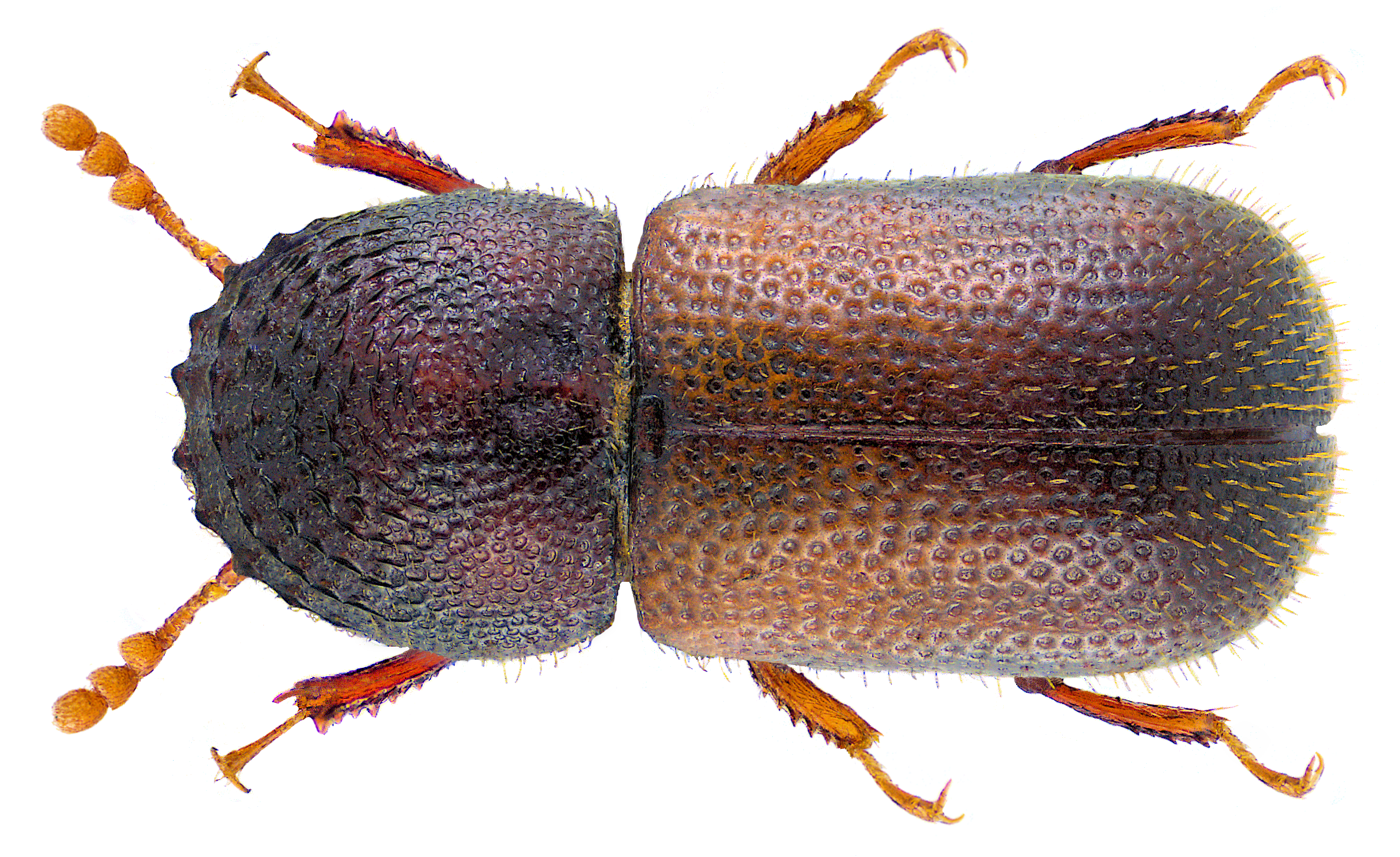
Dinoderus brevis

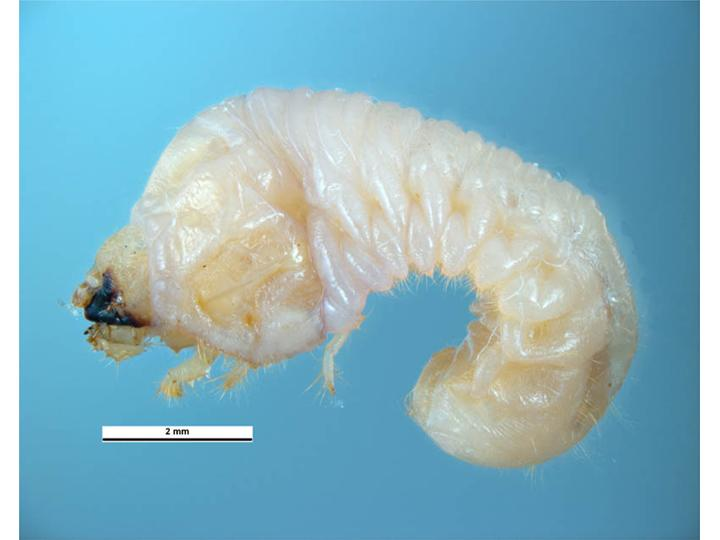
Heterobostrychus aequalis larva

The head of most auger beetles cannot be seen from above, as it is downwardly directed and hidden by the thorax. Exceptions are the powderpost beetles (subfamily Lyctinae), and members of the subfamily Psoinae. Bostrychoplites cornutus has large, distinctive thoracic horns, and is found in parts of Africa and Arabia; it is often imported to Europe as larvae in African wooden bowls ("ethnic souvenirs") .

== Fossils ==
The fossil record of the family extends to the Cretaceous, with the oldest records being from the Cenomanian aged Charentese and Burmese ambers, belonging to the extant genus Stephanopachys and the extant subfamilies Dinoderinae and Polycaoninae.

== Selected species ==
This list is incomplete:

- Amphicerus cornutus (Pallas, 1772)
- Apate terebrans (Pallas, 1772)
- Lichenophanes bicornis (Weber, 1801)
- Prostephanus truncatus (Horn, 1878)
- Xylobiops basilaris (Say, 1824)

Species found in Australia

- Dinoderus minutus (Fabricius)
- Lyctus brunneus (Stephens)
- Lyctus discedens Blackburn
- Lyctus parallelocollis Blackburn
- Mesoxylion collaris (Erichson)
- Mesoxylion cylindricus (Macleay)
- Minthea rugicollis (Walker)
- Rhyzopertha dominica (Fabricius) - lesser grain borer
- Sinoxylon anale (Lesne)
- Xylion cylindricus Macleay
- Xylobosca bispinosa (Macleay)
- Xylodeleis obsipa Germar
- Xylopsocus gibbicollis (Macleay)
- Xylothrips religiosus (Boisduval)
- Xylotillus lindi (Blackburn)

Species found in New Zealand

- Euderia squamosa Broun, 1880
- Dinoderus minutus (Fabricius, 1775)
- Rhyzopertha sp.
- Lyctus brunneus (Stephens, 1829)

Species found in the United Kingdom

- Bostrichus capucinus
- Bostrychoplites cornutus (Olivier, 1790)
- Lyctus cavicollis
- Lyctus linearis (Goeze, 1877)
- Lyctus planicollis
- Lyctus sinensis
- Stephanopachys substriatus
- Trogoxylon parallelopipedum

Fossil species

- †Discoclavata dominicana Poinar Jr., 2013
