= B. cornutus =

B. cornutus may refer to:

- Barbicambarus cornutus, a crayfish species
- Batrachostomus cornutus, a bird species
- Bombus cornutus, a bumblebee species
- Bostrychoplites cornutus, a beetle species

== See also ==
- Cornutus (disambiguation)
