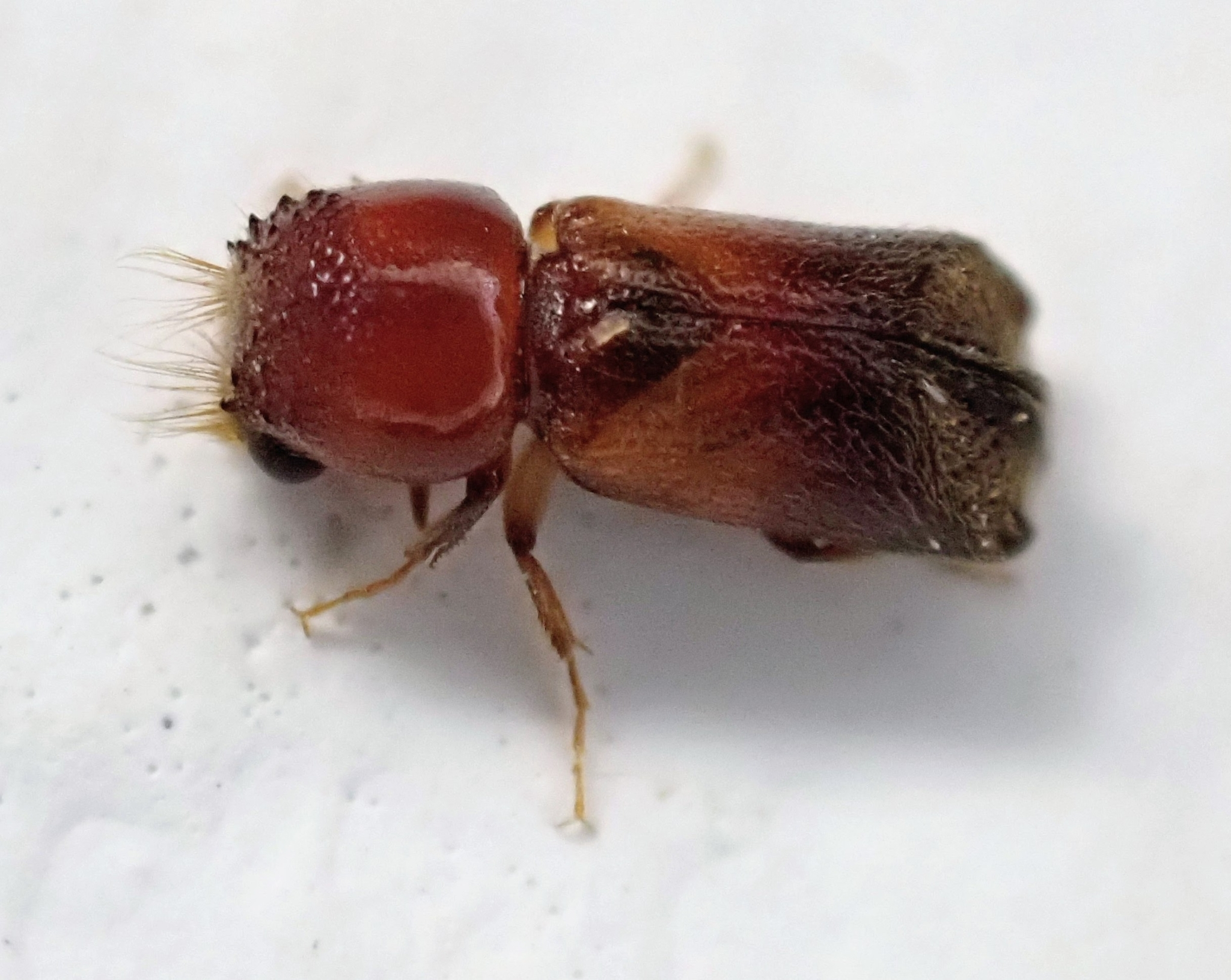
- Scobicia chevrieri, Spain

Scientific classification
- Kingdom: Animalia
- Phylum: Arthropoda
- Class: Insecta
- Order: Coleoptera
- Suborder: Polyphaga
- Family: Bostrichidae
- Subfamily: Bostrichinae; Latreille, 1802

= Bostrichinae =

Subfamily of beetles

Bostrichinae is a subfamily of horned powder-post beetles in the family Bostrichidae. There are more than 60 genera and 500 described species in Bostrichinae.

== Genera ==
The following genera are included in the subfamily Bostrichinae.

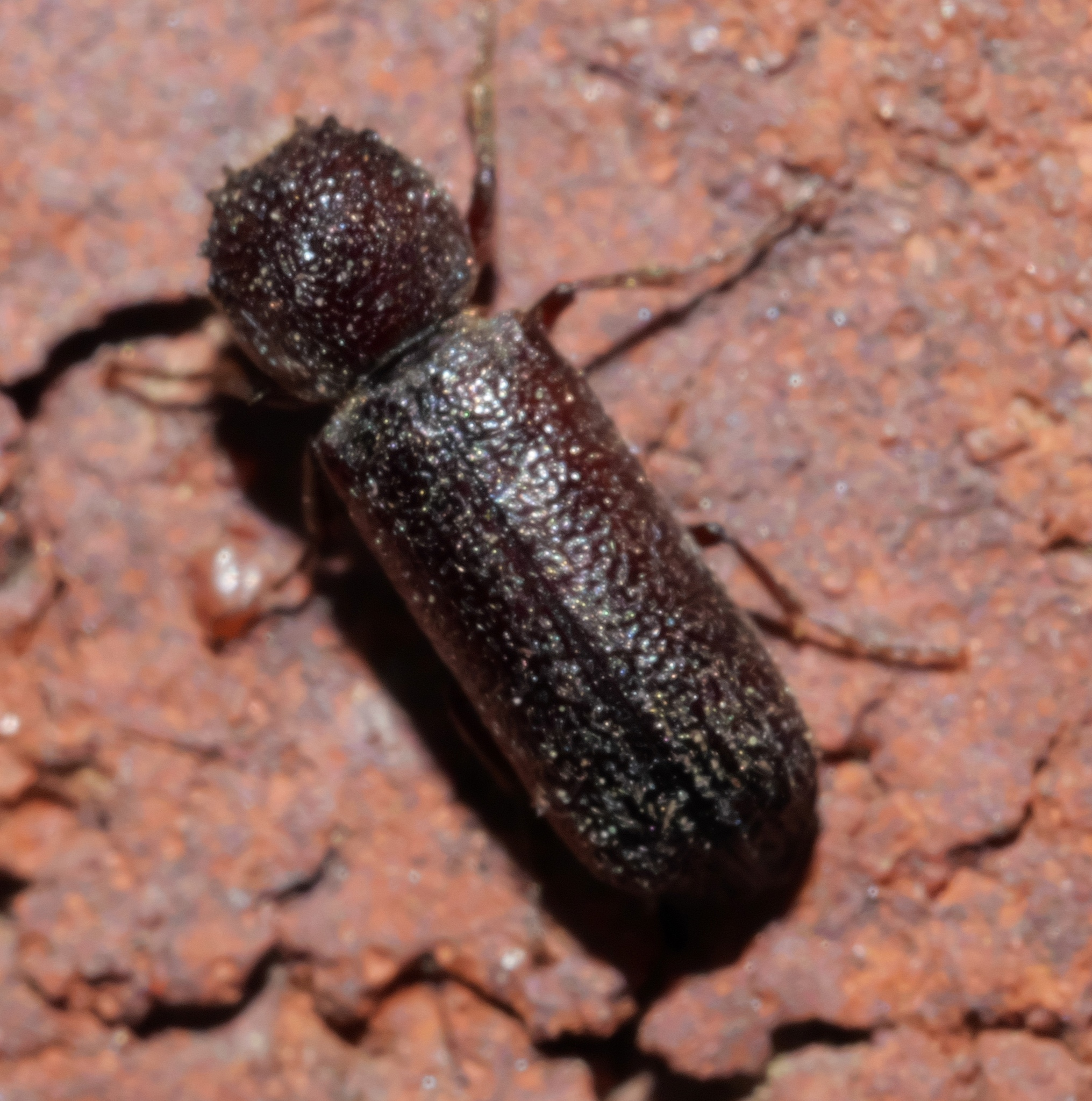
Amphicerus bicaudatus, Oklahoma

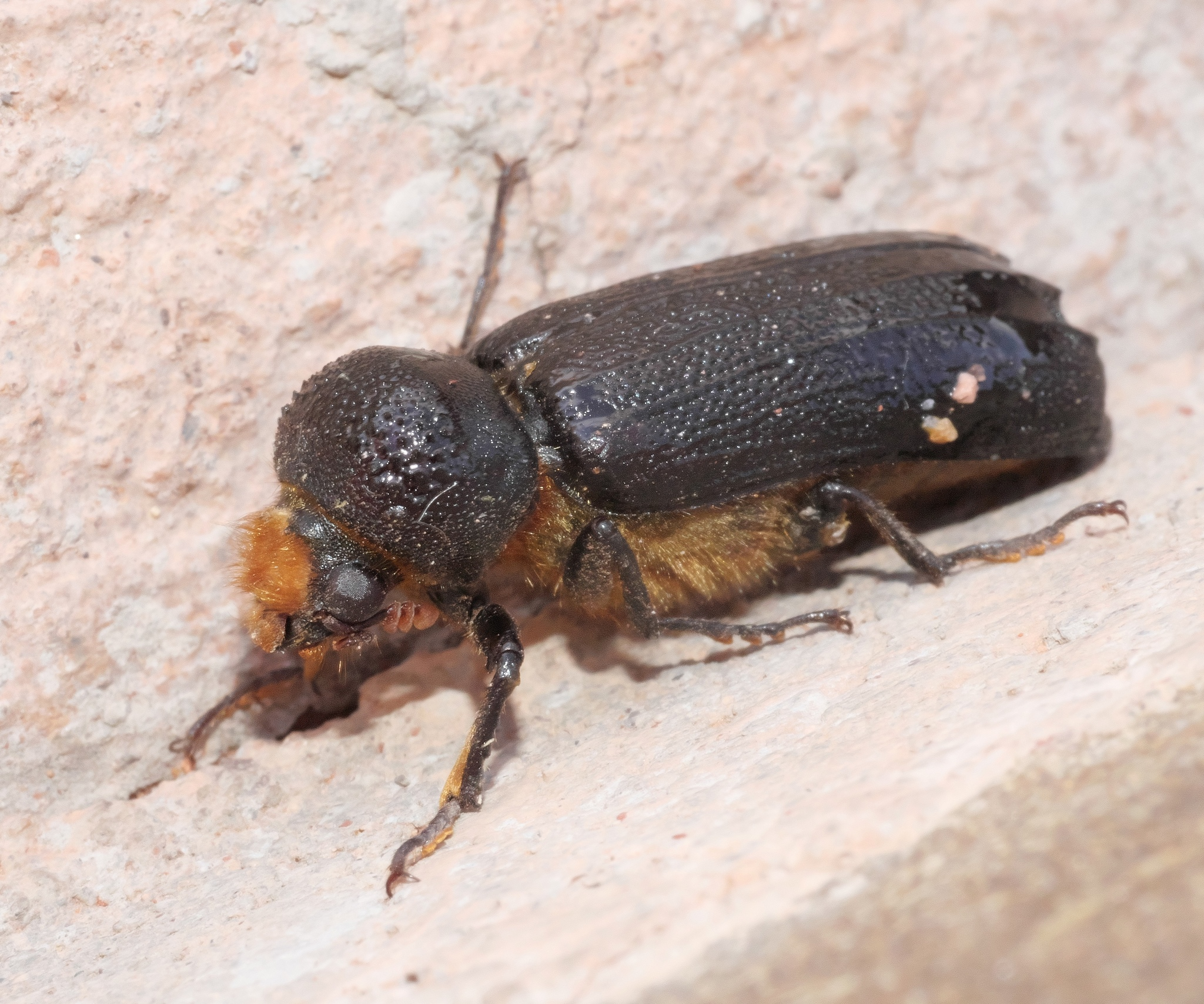
Apatini, Namibia

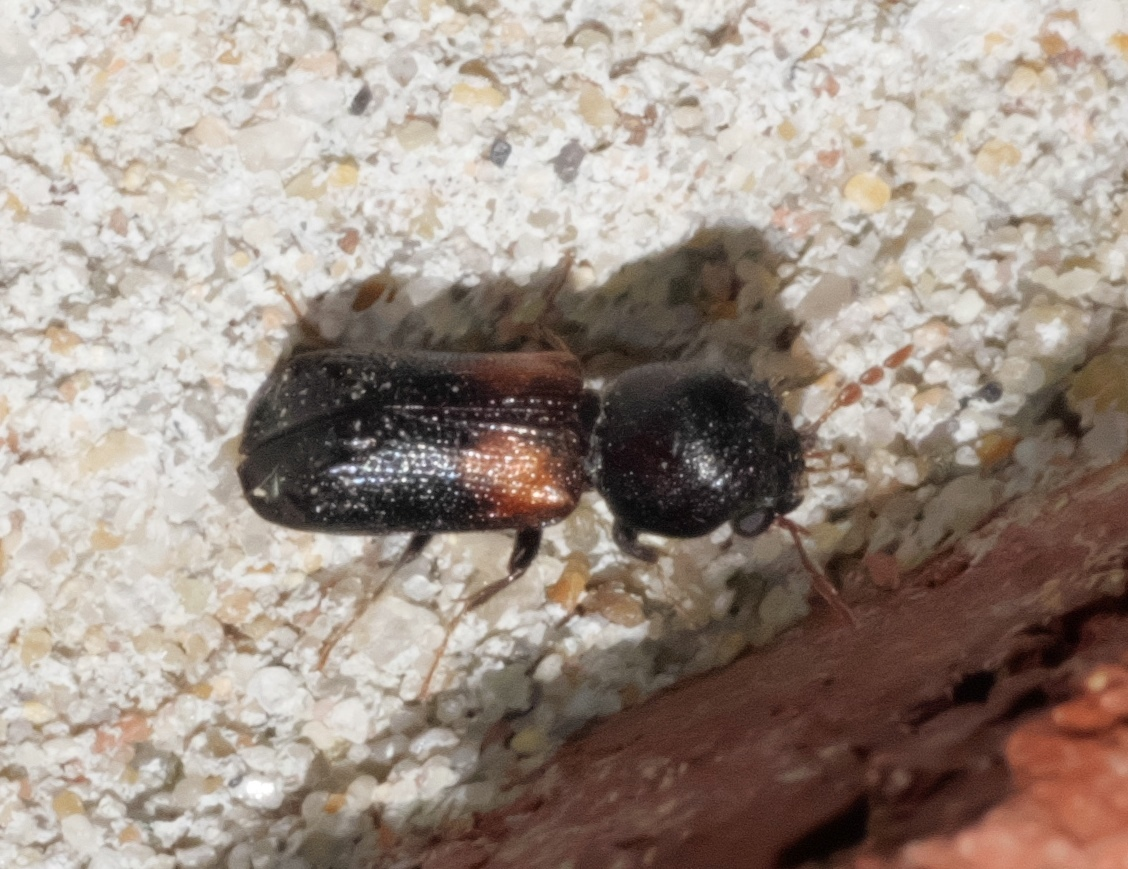
Xylobiops basilaris, Oklahoma

- Tribe Apatini Billberg, 1820
  - Apate Fabricius, 1775
  - Dinapate G. H. Horn, 1886
  - Phonapate Lesne, 1895
  - Xylomedes Lesne, 1902
- Tribe Bostrichini Latreille, 1802
  - Amphicerus LeConte, 1861
  - Apatides Casey, 1898
  - Bostrichus Geoffroy, 1762
  - Bostrycharis Lesne, 1925
  - Bostrychoplites Lesne, 1899
  - Bostrychopsis Lesne, 1899
  - Calophorus Lesne, 1906
  - Dexicrates Lesne, 1899
  - Dolichobostrychus Lesne, 1899
  - Heterobostrychus Lesne, 1899
  - Lichenophanes Lesne, 1899
  - Megabostrichus Chûjô, 1964
  - Micrapate Casey, 1898
  - Neoterius Lesne, 1899
  - Parabostrychus Lesne, 1899
  - Sinoxylodes Lesne, 1899
- Tribe Sinoxylini Marseul, 1857
  - Calodectes Lesne, 1906
  - Calodrypta Lesne, 1906
  - Calopertha Lesne, 1906
  - Sinocalon Lesne, 1906
  - Sinoxylon Duftschmid, 1825
  - Xyloperthodes Lesne, 1906
- Tribe Xyloperthini Lesne, 1921
  - Amintinus Anonymous, 1939
  - Calonistes Lesne, 1936
  - Calophagus Lesne, 1902
  - Ctenobostrychus Reichardt, 1962
  - Dendrobiella Casey, 1898
  - Enneadesmus Mulsant, 1851
  - Mesoxylion Vrydagh, 1955
  - Octodesmus Lesne, 1901
  - Paraxylion Lesne, 1941
  - Paraxylogenes Damoisseau, 1968
  - Plesioxylion Liu & Beaver, 2023
  - Plioxylion Vrydagh, 1955
  - Psicula Lesne, 1941
  - Scobicia Lesne, 1901
  - Sifidius Borowski & Wegrzynowicz, 2007
  - Tetrapriocera Horn, 1878
  - Xylion Lesne, 1901
  - Xylionopsis Lesne, 1937
  - Xylionulus Lesne, 1901
  - Xylobiops Casey, 1898
  - Xyloblaptus Lesne, 1901
  - Xylobosca Lesne, 1901
  - Xylocis Lesne, 1901
  - Xylodectes Lesne, 1901
  - Xylodeleis Lesne, 1901
  - Xylodrypta Lesne, 1901
  - Xylogenes Lesne, 1901
  - Xylomeira Lesne, 1901
  - Xylopertha Guérin-Méneville, 1845
  - Xyloperthella Fisher, 1950
  - Xylophorus Lesne, 1906
  - Xyloprista Lesne, 1901
  - Xylopsocus Lesne, 1901
  - Xylothrips Lesne, 1901
  - Xylotillus Lesne, 1901
