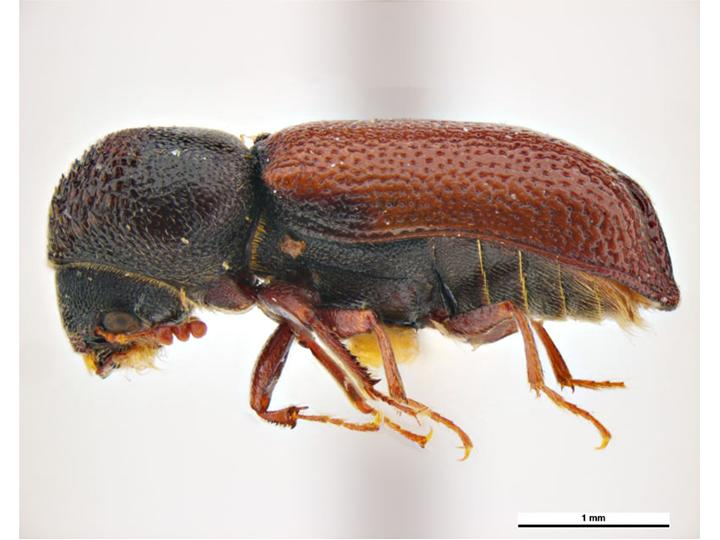

Scientific classification
- Domain: Eukaryota
- Kingdom: Animalia
- Phylum: Arthropoda
- Class: Insecta
- Order: Coleoptera
- Suborder: Polyphaga
- Family: Bostrichidae
- Tribe: Bostrichini
- Genus: Micrapate
- Species: M. dinoderoides

Binomial name
- Micrapate dinoderoides (Horn, 1878)

= Micrapate dinoderoides =

Species of beetle

Micrapate dinoderoides is a species of horned powder-post beetle in the family Bostrichidae. It is found in North America.

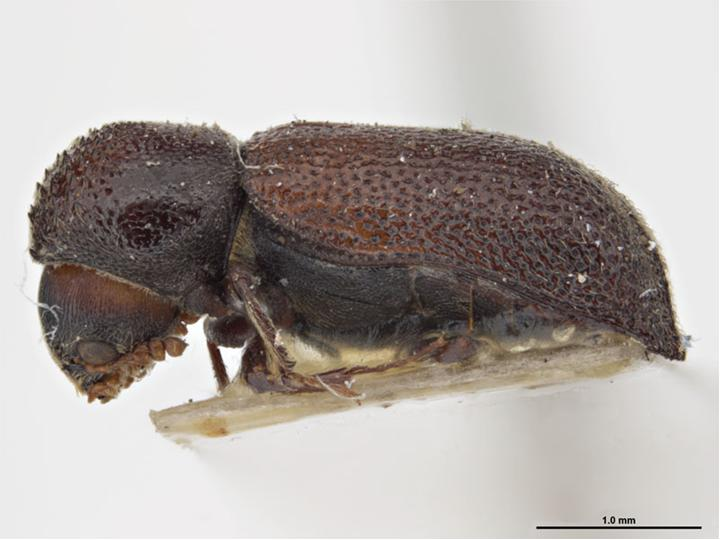
