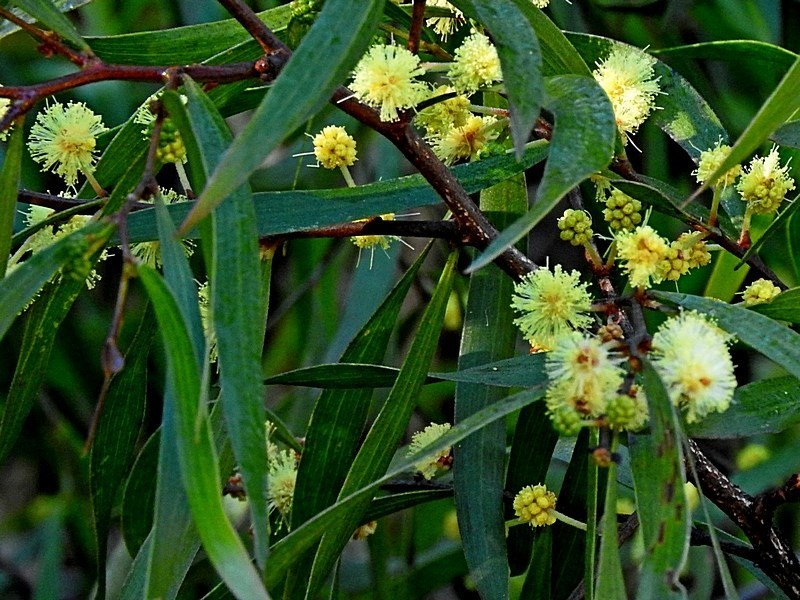
- Near Merimbula

Scientific classification
- Kingdom: Plantae
- Clade: Embryophytes
- Clade: Tracheophytes
- Clade: Spermatophytes
- Clade: Angiosperms
- Clade: Eudicots
- Clade: Rosids
- Order: Fabales
- Family: Fabaceae
- Subfamily: Caesalpinioideae
- Clade: Mimosoid clade
- Genus: Acacia
- Species: A. subporosa

Binomial name
- Acacia subporosa F.Muell.
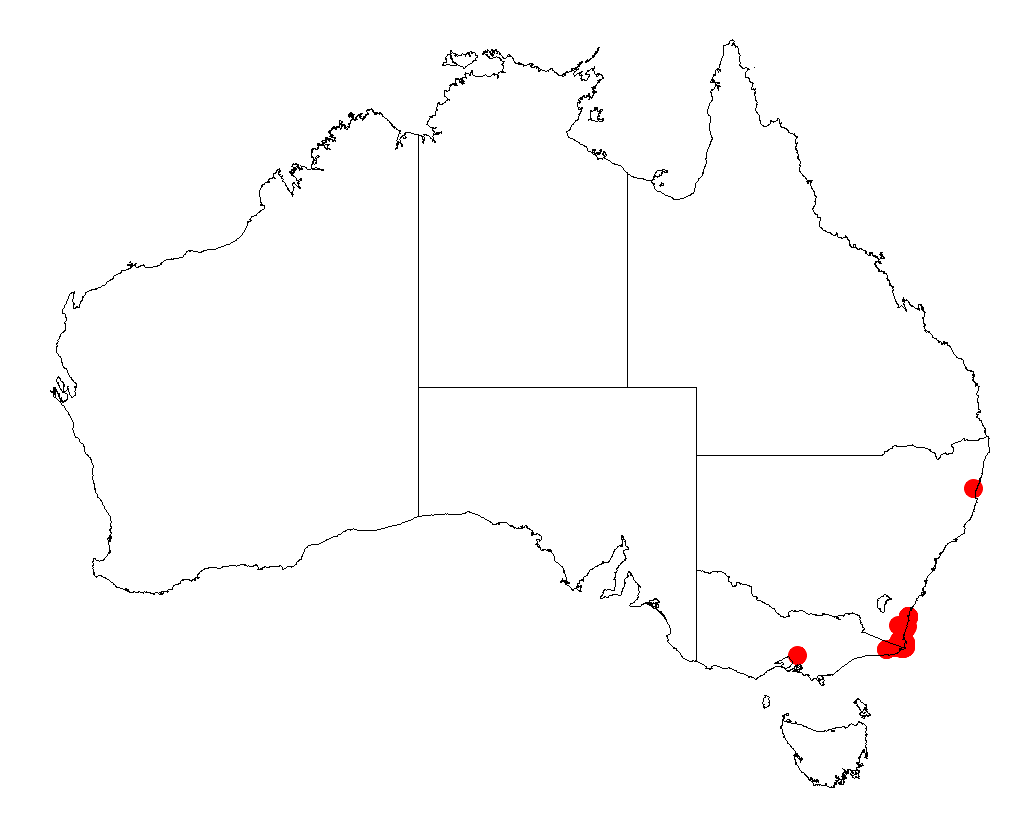
- Occurrence data from AVH

= Acacia subporosa =

Species of legume

Acacia subporosa, also commonly known as river wattle, bower wattle, narrow-leaf bower wattle and sticky bower wattle, is a tree or shrub of the genus Acacia and the subgenus Plurinerves that is endemic to an area of south eastern Australia. It is considered to be rare in Victoria

== Description ==
The tree or shrub typically grow to a height of 4 to 12 m (13 to 39 ft) and has an erect or spreading or rounded habit and a low canopy with a width of around 20 to 30 ft (6.1 to 9.1 m) with weeping branches that have smooth grey or born coloured bark smooth. It has sticky and glabrous branchlets that have green to brown alternating ridges. Like most species of Acacia it has phyllodes rather than true leaves. The thin and glabrous phyllodes have a very narrowly elliptic shape than can be slightly to moderately incurved with a length of 6 to 9 cm (2.4 to 3.5 in) and a width of 4 to 11 mm (0.16 to 0.43 in) and have two to five main nerves per face and other less pronounced longitudinal nerves in between. It blooms between July and October and occasionally into the summertime producing pale yellow flowers. The simple inflorescences occur singly or in groups of up to three in the axils and have spherical flower-heads with a diameter of 6 to 7 mm (0.24 to 0.28 in) containing 20 to 25 flowers. Following flowering firmly chartaceous and glabrous seed pods are formed that are linear with a length of up to 7.5 cm (3.0 in) and contain glossy dark brown seeds with an oblong shape, a length of about 4 mm (0.16 in) and a small terminal aril.

== Taxonomy ==
The species was first formally described by the botanist Ferdinand von Mueller in 1863 as a part of the work Fragmenta Phytographiae Australiae , the initial spelling was Acacia supporosa. It was reclassified as Racosperma subporosum by Leslie Pedley in 2003 then transferred back to genus Acacia in 2006. The type specimen was collected by von Mueller from Twofold bay in New South Wales. The specific epithet is derived from the small oil glands on the phyllodes. The species is closely related to Acacia cognata and both belong to the Acacia verniciflua complex.

== Distribution ==
It is native to coastal areas of south eastern New South Wales and north western Victoria. The range of the plant extends from around Bega in the north to around Howe Hill on the north eastern tip of the Victoria-New South Wales border in the south in the far east Gippsland area. It is commonly situated along creeks and streams in gullies or on low hillsides found near the margins of rainforest communities growing in moist sandy or shale-based soils and conglomerates. It is often associated with Acacia longifolia.

== Cultivation ==
The tree is used as street trees or as a screening plant, it can grow at a rate of about 24 in (610 mm) per annum and live for almost 50 years. The plant is susceptible to root rot and shothole borer.

== See also ==
- List of Acacia species
