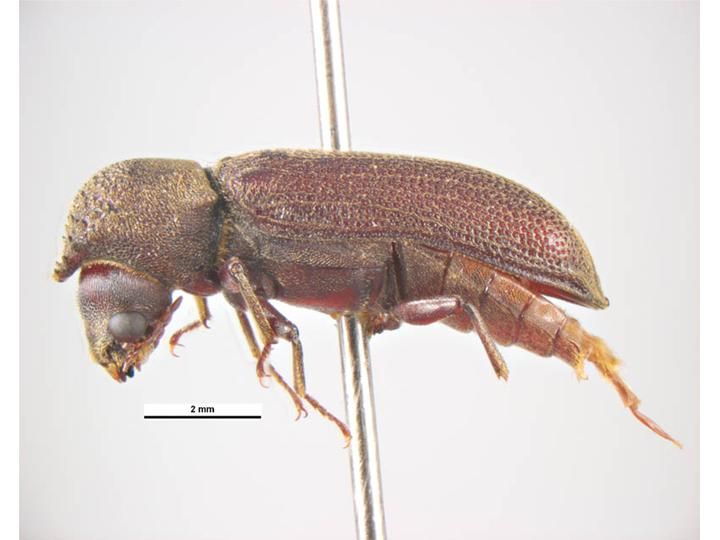

Scientific classification
- Domain: Eukaryota
- Kingdom: Animalia
- Phylum: Arthropoda
- Class: Insecta
- Order: Coleoptera
- Suborder: Polyphaga
- Family: Bostrichidae
- Tribe: Bostrichini
- Genus: Heterobostrychus
- Species: H. brunneus

Binomial name
- Heterobostrychus brunneus (Murray, 1867)

= Heterobostrychus brunneus =

Species of beetle

Heterobostrychus brunneus, the boxwood borer, is a species of horned powder-post beetle in the family Bostrichidae. It is found in Africa, Australia, Europe and Northern Asia (excluding China), and North America.
