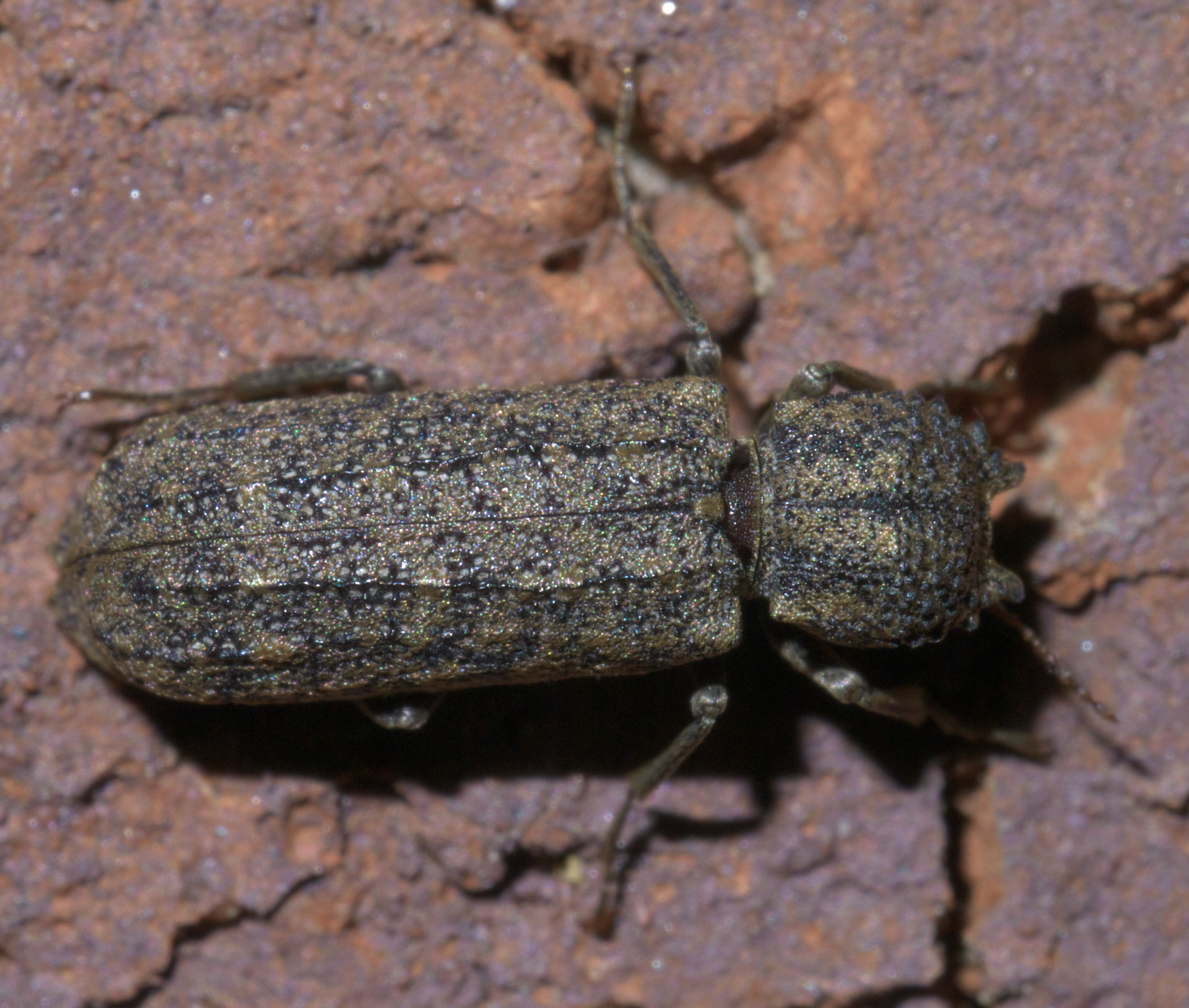

Scientific classification
- Domain: Eukaryota
- Kingdom: Animalia
- Phylum: Arthropoda
- Class: Insecta
- Order: Coleoptera
- Suborder: Polyphaga
- Family: Bostrichidae
- Tribe: Bostrichini
- Genus: Lichenophanes
- Species: L. bicornis

Binomial name
- Lichenophanes bicornis (Weber, 1801)

= Lichenophanes bicornis =

Species of beetle

Lichenophanes bicornis is a species of horned powder-post beetle in the family Bostrichidae. It is found in North America.

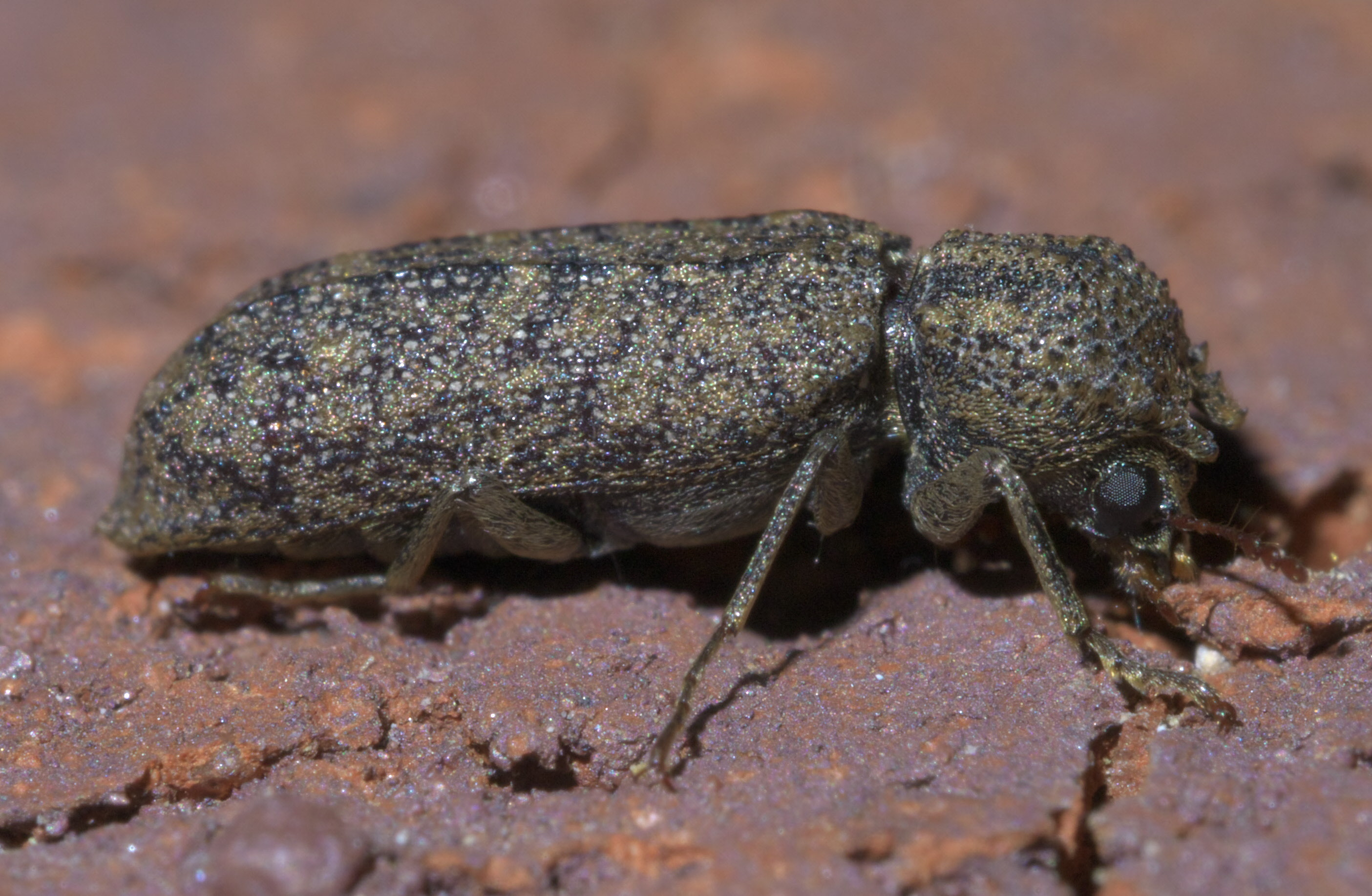

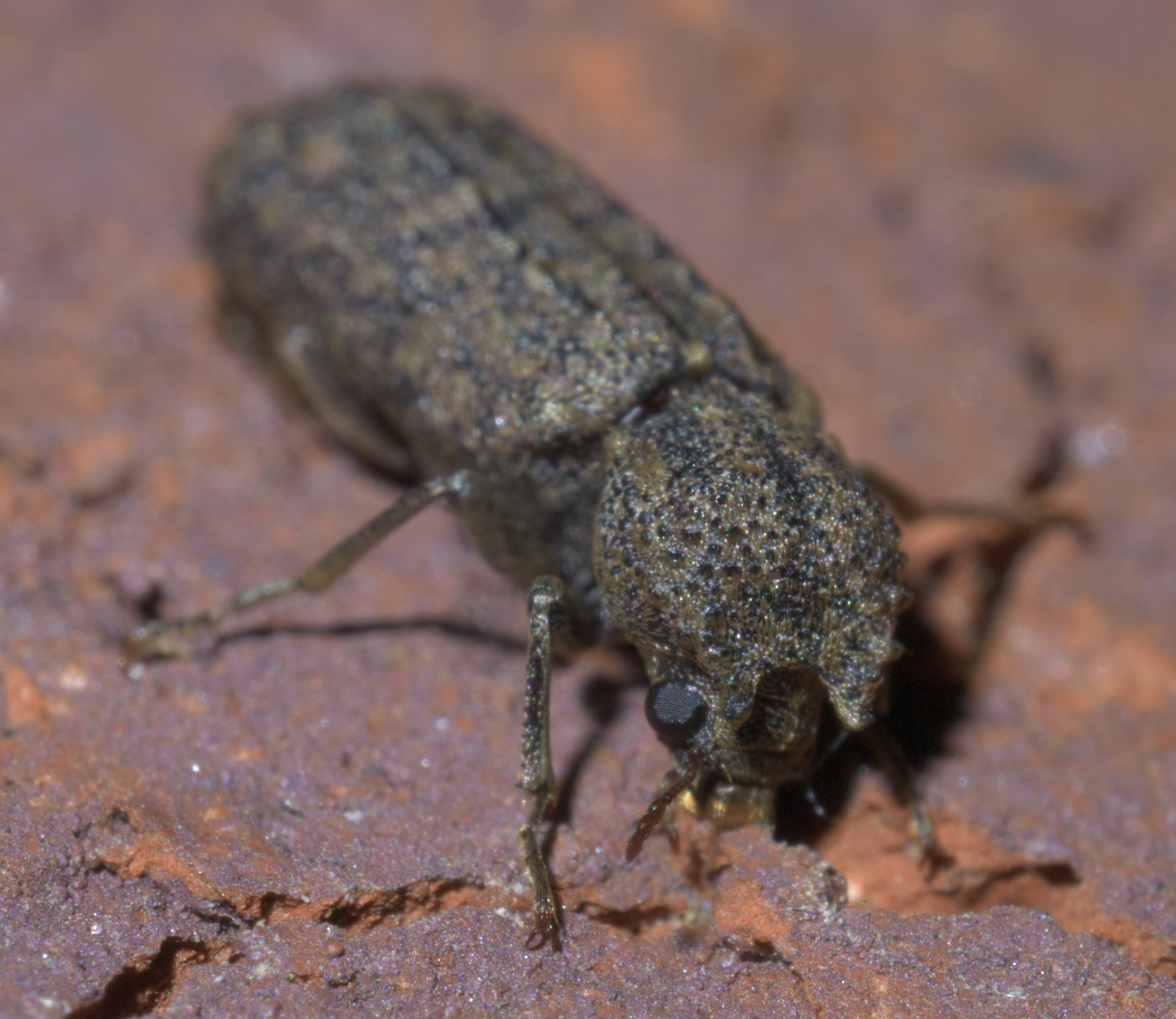
