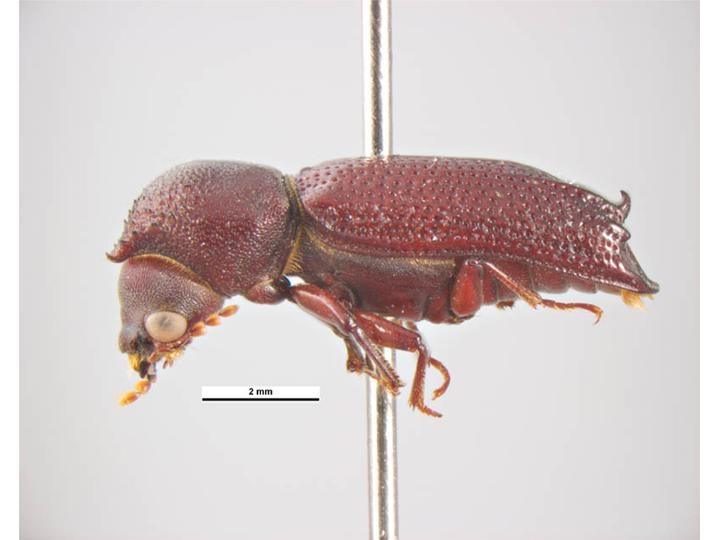

Scientific classification
- Domain: Eukaryota
- Kingdom: Animalia
- Phylum: Arthropoda
- Class: Insecta
- Order: Coleoptera
- Suborder: Polyphaga
- Family: Bostrichidae
- Tribe: Bostrichini
- Genus: Heterobostrychus
- Species: H. aequalis

Binomial name
- Heterobostrychus aequalis (Waterhouse, 1884)

= Heterobostrychus aequalis =

Species of beetle

Heterobostrychus aequalis, known generally as oriental wood borer, is a species of horned powder-post beetle in the family Bostrichidae. Other common names include the lesser auger beetle (Australia) and oriental bostrichid. It is found in Africa, Australia, Europe and Northern Asia (excluding China), North America, Oceania, and Southern Asia.
