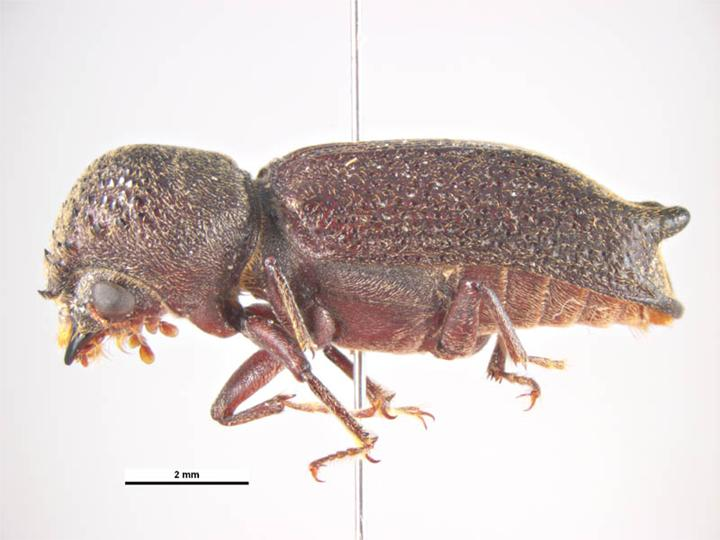

Scientific classification
- Domain: Eukaryota
- Kingdom: Animalia
- Phylum: Arthropoda
- Class: Insecta
- Order: Coleoptera
- Suborder: Polyphaga
- Family: Bostrichidae
- Tribe: Bostrichini
- Genus: Heterobostrychus
- Species: H. hamatipennis

Binomial name
- Heterobostrychus hamatipennis (Lesne, 1895)

= Heterobostrychus hamatipennis =

Species of beetle

Heterobostrychus hamatipennis, the Chinese auger beetle, is a species of horned powder-post beetle in the family Bostrichidae. It is found in Africa, Europe and Northern Asia (excluding China), North America, and Southern Asia.
