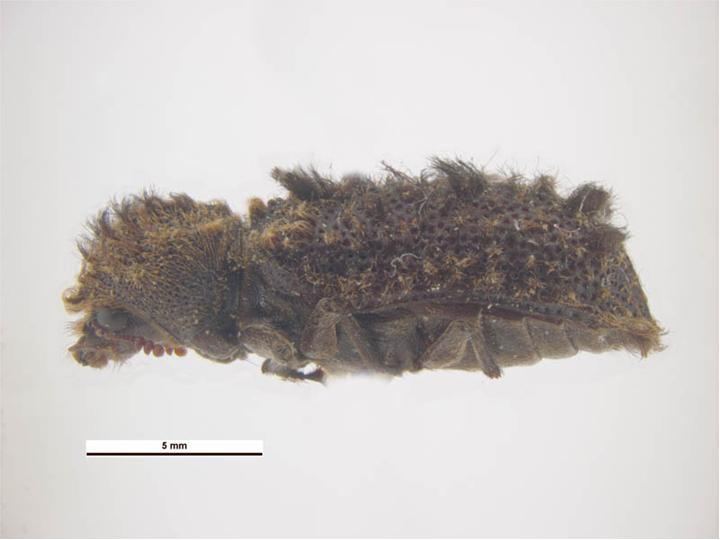

Scientific classification
- Domain: Eukaryota
- Kingdom: Animalia
- Phylum: Arthropoda
- Class: Insecta
- Order: Coleoptera
- Suborder: Polyphaga
- Family: Bostrichidae
- Tribe: Bostrichini
- Genus: Lichenophanes
- Species: L. fasciculatus

Binomial name
- Lichenophanes fasciculatus (Fall, 1909)

= Lichenophanes fasciculatus =

Species of beetle

Lichenophanes fasciculatus is a species of horned powder-post beetle in the family Bostrichidae. It is found in North America.
