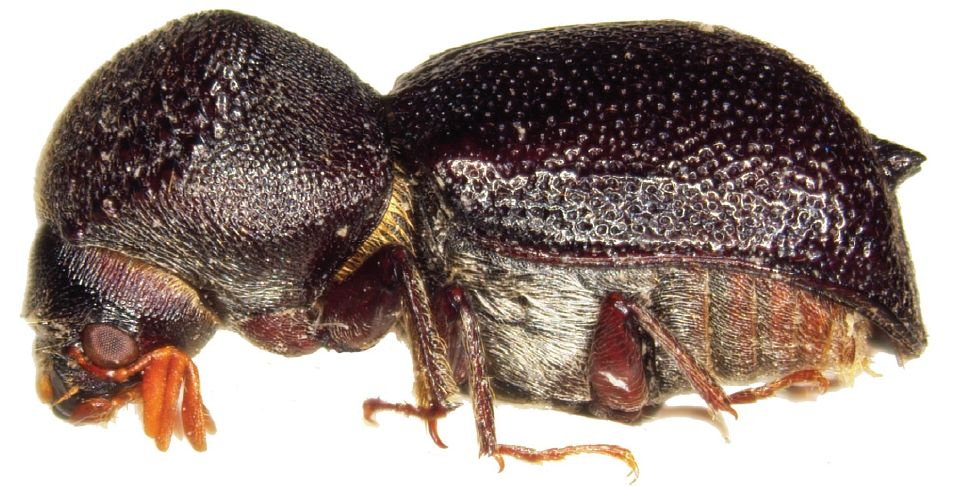

Scientific classification
- Domain: Eukaryota
- Kingdom: Animalia
- Phylum: Arthropoda
- Class: Insecta
- Order: Coleoptera
- Suborder: Polyphaga
- Family: Bostrichidae
- Genus: Sinoxylon
- Species: S. unidentatum

Binomial name
- Sinoxylon unidentatum (Fabricius, 1801)

Synonyms
- Sinoxylon conigerum Gerstäcker, 1855

= Sinoxylon unidentatum =

Species of beetle

Sinoxylon unidentatum, the conifer auger beetle, is a species of horned powder-post beetle in the family Bostrichidae. It is found in Africa, North America, Oceania, South America, and Southern Asia.

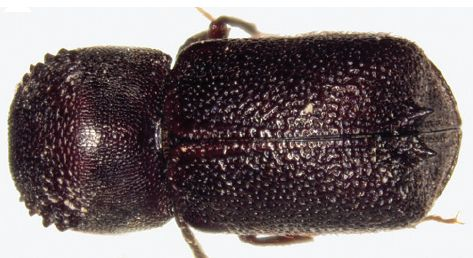
Conifer auger beetle, Sinoxylon unidentatum
