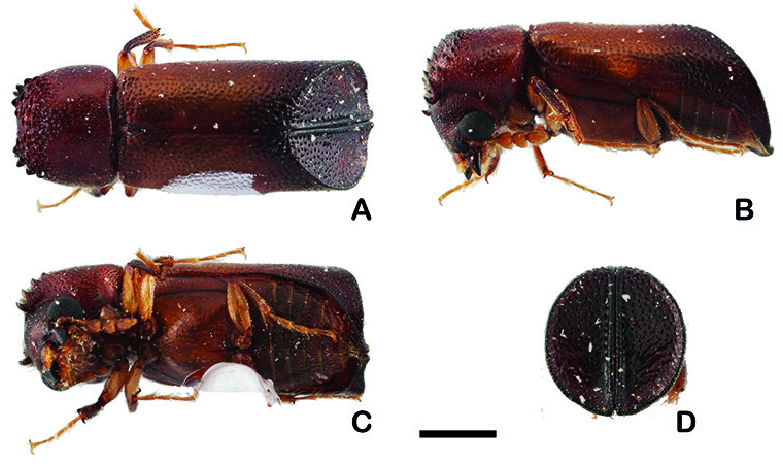
- Infrantenna fissilis gen. et sp. nov., ♂, holotype (NHMUK014433955). A. Dorsal view. B. Lateral view. C. Ventral view. D. Declivity. E. False epipleuron. Scale bar = 1 mm.

Scientific classification
- Kingdom: Animalia
- Phylum: Arthropoda
- Clade: Pancrustacea
- Class: Insecta
- Order: Coleoptera
- Suborder: Polyphaga
- Family: Bostrichidae
- Subfamily: Bostrichinae
- Tribe: Xyloperthini
- Genus: Infrantenna; Liu & Sittichaya, 2022
- Species: I. fissilis

Binomial name
- Infrantenna fissilis Liu & Sittichaya, 2022

= Infrantenna =

Genus of beetles

Infrantenna is a genus of horned powder-post beetles in the family Bostrichidae. It is monotypic, being represented by the single species, Infrantenna fissilis, which is found in northern Thailand.

== Description ==
Adults reach a length of about 3.3–3.6 mm (males) and 4–4.5 mm (females). The head, pronotum, pro- and mesotibiae and tarsi, as well as the ventral side are reddish brown. The labrum, antennae, elytral disc, pro- and mesofemora and the hind legs are brown. The pronotum and elytra gradually become darker brown anteriorly and posteriorly respectively, and the elytral declivity is dark brown.

== Life history ==
As a member of the family Bostrichidae, the species is likely to be polyphagous. The junior author extracted the specimens from a semi-dry twig of an unknown species of Fagaceae. The authors suggest that the hind legs could move vertically in the clefts to clean wood frass. The strongly developed last abdominal ventrite and tergite of the female may help to hold the male genitalia during mating and support the ovipositor during oviposition. Observations of mating and oviposition behaviours are necessary to confirm this hypothesis.

== Etymology ==
The genus name is feminine, and refers to the unusually low position of the antennal fossa. The name fissilis is derived from the Latin word for cleft which refers to the deep clefts of the elytral declivity of the female.
