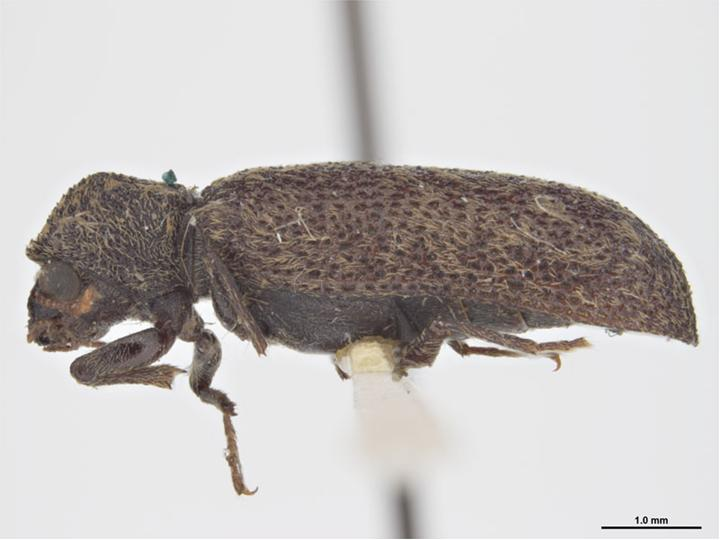

Scientific classification
- Kingdom: Animalia
- Phylum: Arthropoda
- Class: Insecta
- Order: Coleoptera
- Suborder: Polyphaga
- Family: Bostrichidae
- Tribe: Bostrichini
- Genus: Lichenophanes
- Species: L. angustus

Binomial name
- Lichenophanes angustus (Casey, 1898)

Synonyms
- Lichenophanes mutchleri Belkin, 1940

= Lichenophanes angustus =

Species of beetle

Lichenophanes angustus is a species of horned powder-post beetle in the family Bostrichidae. It is found in North America.

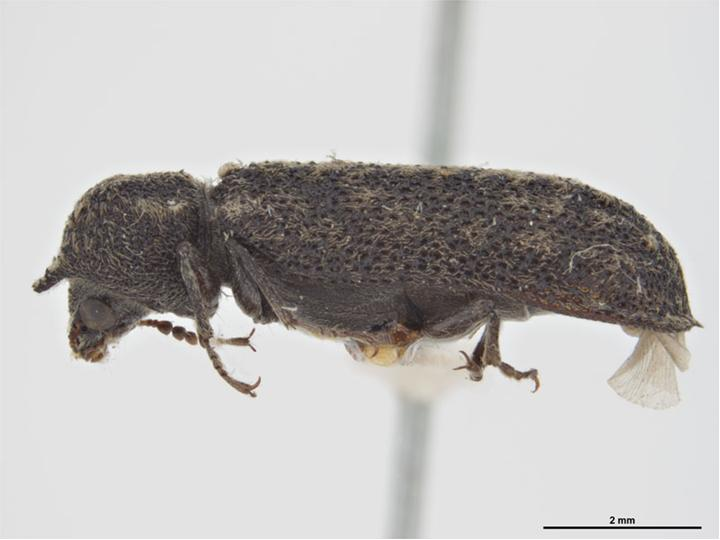
