= Micrapate cristicauda =

Scientific classification
- Kingdom: Animalia
- Phylum: Arthropoda
- Class: Insecta
- Order: Coleoptera
- Suborder: Polyphaga
- Family: Bostrichidae
- Tribe: Bostrichini
- Genus: Micrapate
- Species: M. cristicauda

Binomial name
- Micrapate cristicauda Casey, 1898

Species of beetle

Micrapate cristicauda is a species of horned powder-post beetle in the family Bostrichidae. It is found in North America. Adults have emerged from dead Vitis rotundifolia vines.
