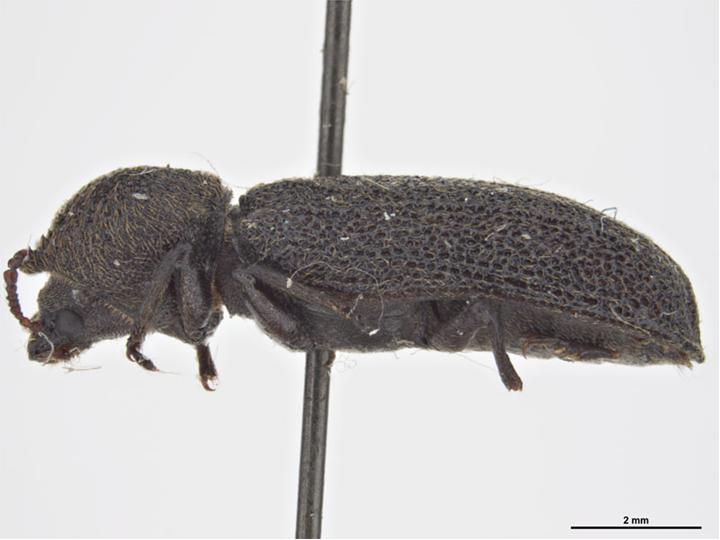

Scientific classification
- Domain: Eukaryota
- Kingdom: Animalia
- Phylum: Arthropoda
- Class: Insecta
- Order: Coleoptera
- Suborder: Polyphaga
- Family: Bostrichidae
- Tribe: Bostrichini
- Genus: Lichenophanes
- Species: L. californicus

Binomial name
- Lichenophanes californicus (Horn, 1878)

= Lichenophanes californicus =

Species of beetle

Lichenophanes californicus is a species of horned powder-post beetle in the family Bostrichidae. It is found in North America.
