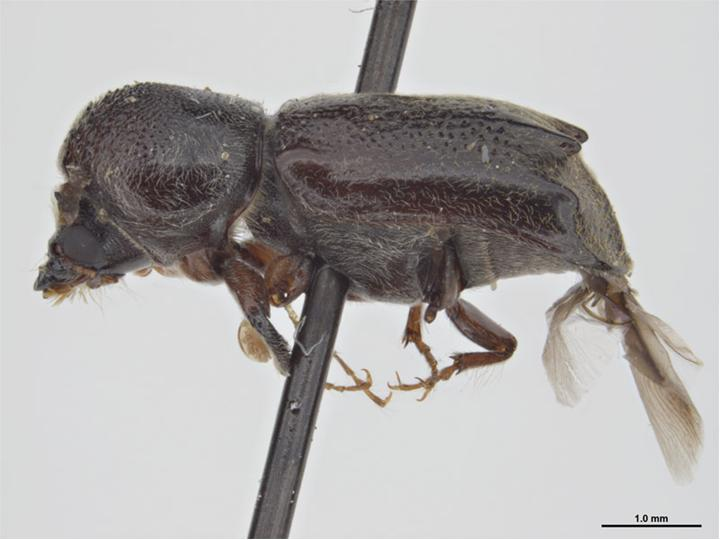
- Dendrobiella aspera

Scientific classification
- Kingdom: Animalia
- Phylum: Arthropoda
- Class: Insecta
- Order: Coleoptera
- Suborder: Polyphaga
- Family: Bostrichidae
- Subfamily: Bostrichinae
- Tribe: Xyloperthini; Lesne, 1921

= Xyloperthini =

Tribe of beetles

Xyloperthini is a tribe of horned powder-post beetles in the family Bostrichidae. There are more than 30 genera and 140 described species in Xyloperthini.

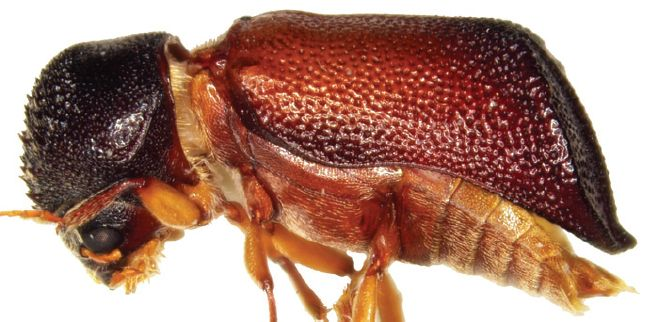
Xylopsocus capucinus

== Genera ==
These genera belong to the tribe Xyloperthini:

- Amintinus Anonymous, 1939
- Calonistes Lesne, 1936
- Calophagus Lesne, 1902
- Ctenobostrychus Reichardt, 1962
- Dendrobiella Casey, 1898
- Enneadesmus Mulsant, 1851
- Infrantenna Liu & Sittichaya, 2022
- Mesoxylion Vrydagh, 1955
- Octodesmus Lesne, 1901
- Paraxylion Lesne, 1941
- Paraxylogenes Damoisseau, 1968
- Plesioxylion Liu & Beaver, 2023
- Plioxylion Vrydagh, 1955
- Psicula Lesne, 1941
- Scobicia Lesne, 1901
- Sifidius Borowski & Wegrzynowicz, 2007
- Tetrapriocera Horn, 1878
- Xylion Lesne, 1901
- Xylionopsis Lesne, 1937
- Xylionulus Lesne, 1901
- Xylobiops Casey, 1898
- Xyloblaptus Lesne, 1901
- Xylobosca Lesne, 1901
- Xylocis Lesne, 1901
- Xylodectes Lesne, 1901
- Xylodeleis Lesne, 1901
- Xylodrypta Lesne, 1901
- Xylogenes Lesne, 1901
- Xylomeira Lesne, 1901
- Xylopertha Guérin-Méneville, 1845
- Xyloperthella Fisher, 1950
- Xylophorus Lesne, 1906
- Xyloprista Lesne, 1901
- Xylopsocus Lesne, 1901
- Xylothrips Lesne, 1901
- Xylotillus Lesne, 1901
