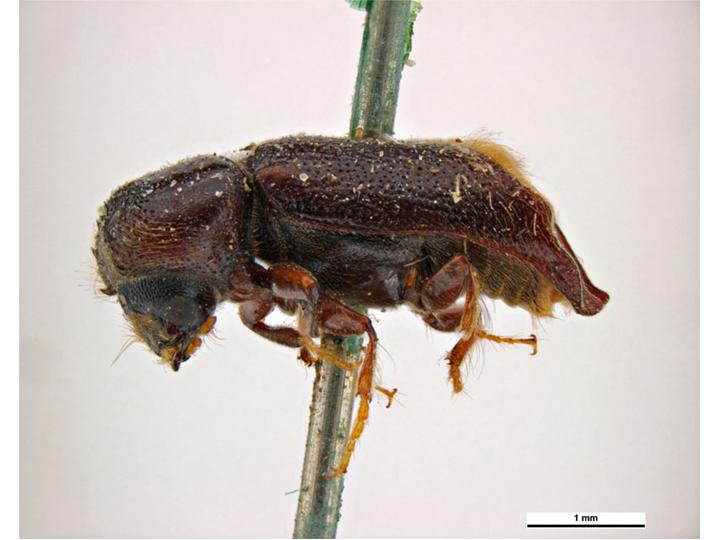
- Xylopertha retusa

Scientific classification
- Kingdom: Animalia
- Phylum: Arthropoda
- Class: Insecta
- Order: Coleoptera
- Suborder: Polyphaga
- Family: Bostrichidae
- Subfamily: Bostrichinae
- Tribe: Xyloperthini
- Genus: Xylopertha; Guérin-Méneville, 1845

Selected species
- Xylopertha praeusta; Xylopertha retusa

= Xylopertha =

Genus of beetles

Xylopertha is a genus of beetle found in Europe, the Near East and North Africa.
