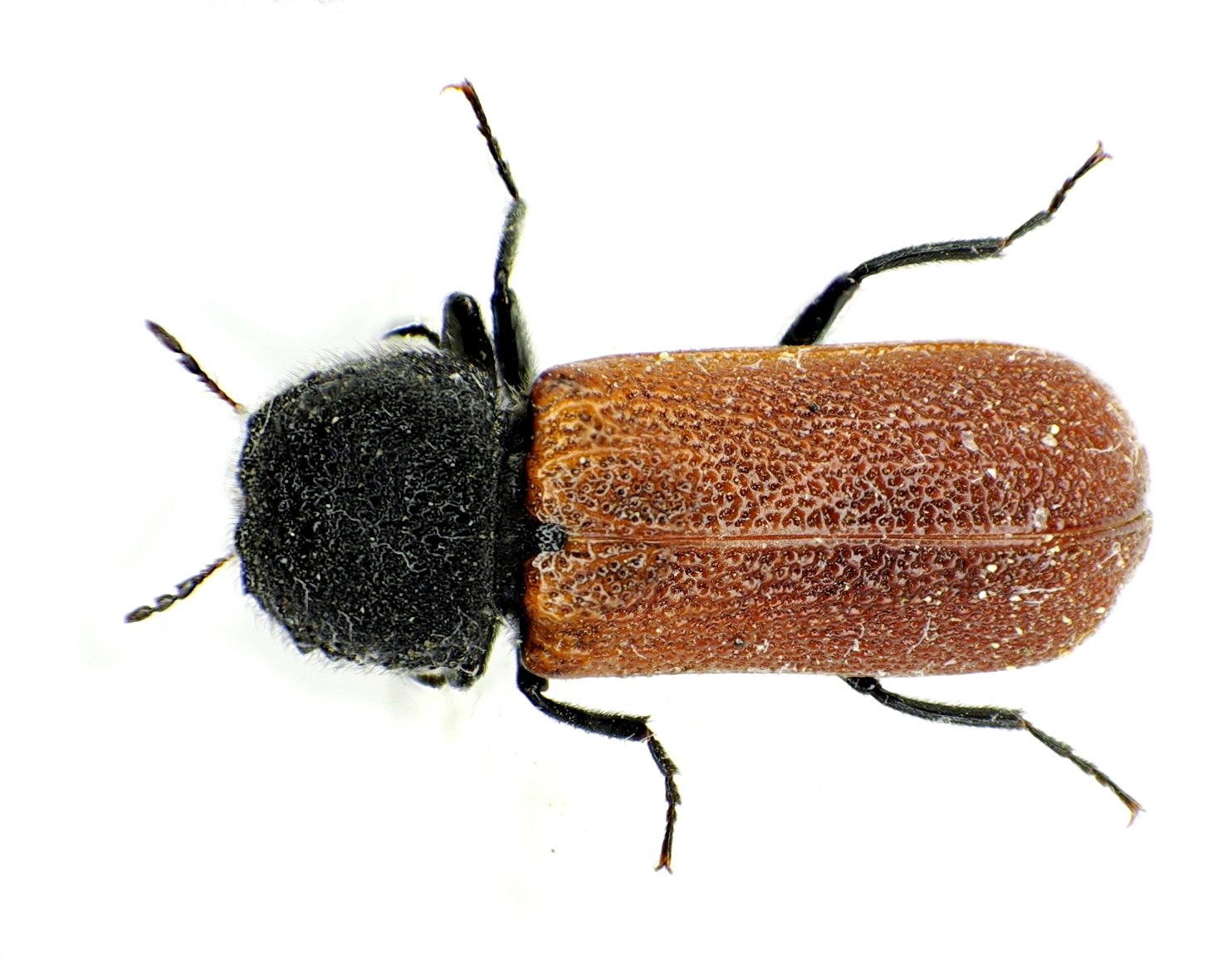
- Bostrichus capucinus

Scientific classification
- Kingdom: Animalia
- Phylum: Arthropoda
- Class: Insecta
- Order: Coleoptera
- Suborder: Polyphaga
- Family: Bostrichidae
- Subfamily: Bostrichinae
- Tribe: Bostrichini
- Genus: Bostrichus; Geoffroy, 1762

= Bostrichus =

Genus of beetles

Bostrichus is a genus of beetles found in the Palearctic (including Europe), the Near East, and North Africa.
