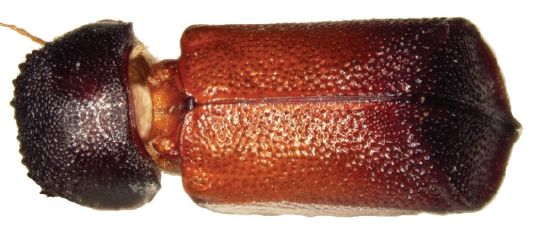

Scientific classification
- Kingdom: Animalia
- Phylum: Arthropoda
- Clade: Pancrustacea
- Class: Insecta
- Order: Coleoptera
- Suborder: Polyphaga
- Family: Bostrichidae
- Genus: Xylopsocus
- Species: X. capucinus

Binomial name
- Xylopsocus capucinus (Fabricius, 1781)

= Xylopsocus capucinus =

Species of beetle

Xylopsocus capucinus is a species of horned powder-post beetle in the family Bostrichidae. It is found in Africa, Australia, North America, Oceania, South America, and Southern Asia.

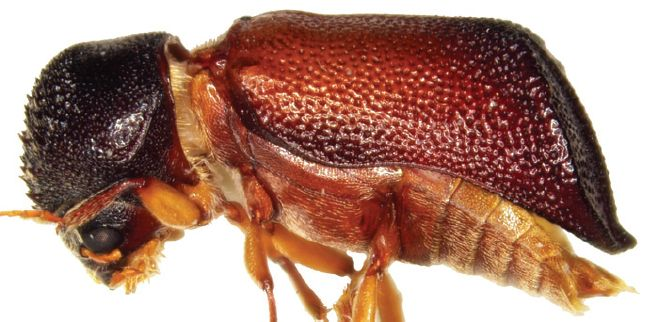
