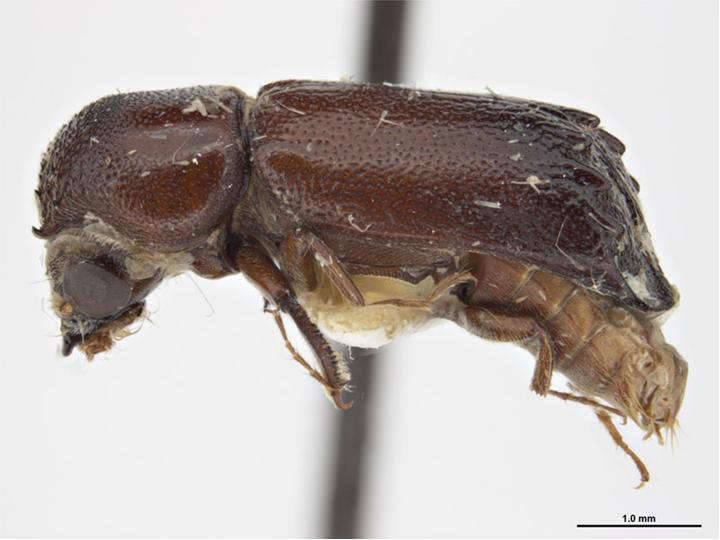

Scientific classification
- Kingdom: Animalia
- Phylum: Arthropoda
- Class: Insecta
- Order: Coleoptera
- Suborder: Polyphaga
- Family: Bostrichidae
- Genus: Tetrapriocera
- Species: T. longicornis

Binomial name
- Tetrapriocera longicornis (Olivier, 1795)

= Tetrapriocera longicornis =

Species of beetle

Tetrapriocera longicornis is a species of horned powder-post beetle in the family Bostrichidae. It is found in the Caribbean, Europe and Northern Asia (excluding China), Central America, North America, and South America.
