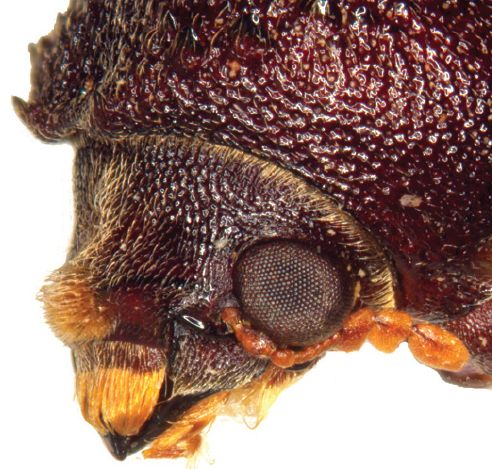
- Heterobostrychus unicornis

Scientific classification
- Kingdom: Animalia
- Phylum: Arthropoda
- Class: Insecta
- Order: Coleoptera
- Suborder: Polyphaga
- Family: Bostrichidae
- Subfamily: Bostrichinae
- Tribe: Bostrichini
- Genus: Heterobostrychus; Lesne, 1899

Species
- 6, see text

= Heterobostrychus =

Genus of beetles

Heterobostrychus is a genus of beetles in the family Bostrichidae, the horned powder post beetles. Like other beetles of the family, these live in wood, often inflicting significant damage on timber and other wood products. This genus can also be found in crop plants such as cassava, potato, coffee, oilseeds, and pulse crops.

Heterobostrychus aequalis, known commonly as the lesser auger beetle, trank borer, black borer, and kapok borer, is a notorious pest of many wood products. It has been found in plywood, furniture, wooden toys, wooden clogs, and carvings.

These beetles are transported from their native range in tree products and introduced to other regions in timber shipments. Several species have easily established in new areas, particularly those with warm climates, as they do not tolerate cold. H. aequalis is now found on six continents in regions within 40° of the Equator.

Heterobostrychus brunneus is most common in bamboo.

The adult Heterobostrychus is 1 to 1.5 centimeters long. The head is tucked back within the thorax and not visible from the top.

There are six known species.

Species:

- Heterobostrychus aequalis
- Heterobostrychus ambigenus
- Heterobostrychus brunneus
- Heterobostrychus hamatipennis
- Heterobostrychus pileatus
- Heterobostrychus unicornis
