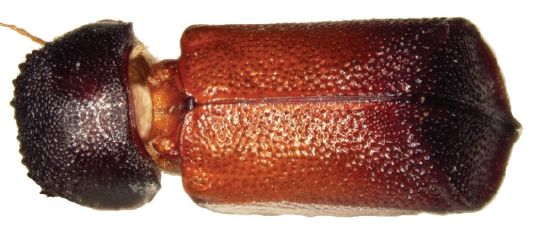

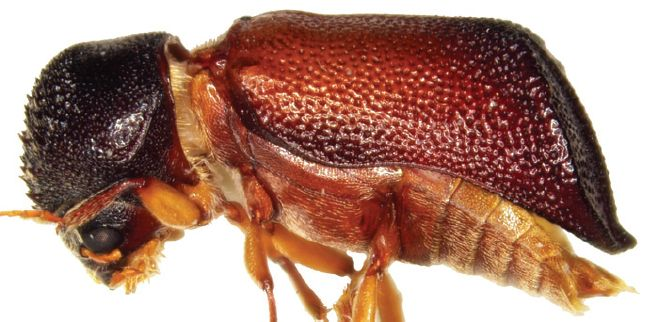
- Xylopsocus capucinus

Scientific classification
- Kingdom: Animalia
- Phylum: Arthropoda
- Class: Insecta
- Order: Coleoptera
- Suborder: Polyphaga
- Family: Bostrichidae
- Subfamily: Bostrichinae
- Tribe: Xyloperthini
- Genus: Xylopsocus; Lesne, 1901

= Xylopsocus =

Genus of beetles

Xylopsocus is an Asian genus of beetles, containing seventeen species. One of these, Xylopsocus capucinus, has become established in Florida, while another, Xylopsocus castanoptera, has been intercepted at ports in North America. Xylopsocus gibbicollis is native to Australia.
