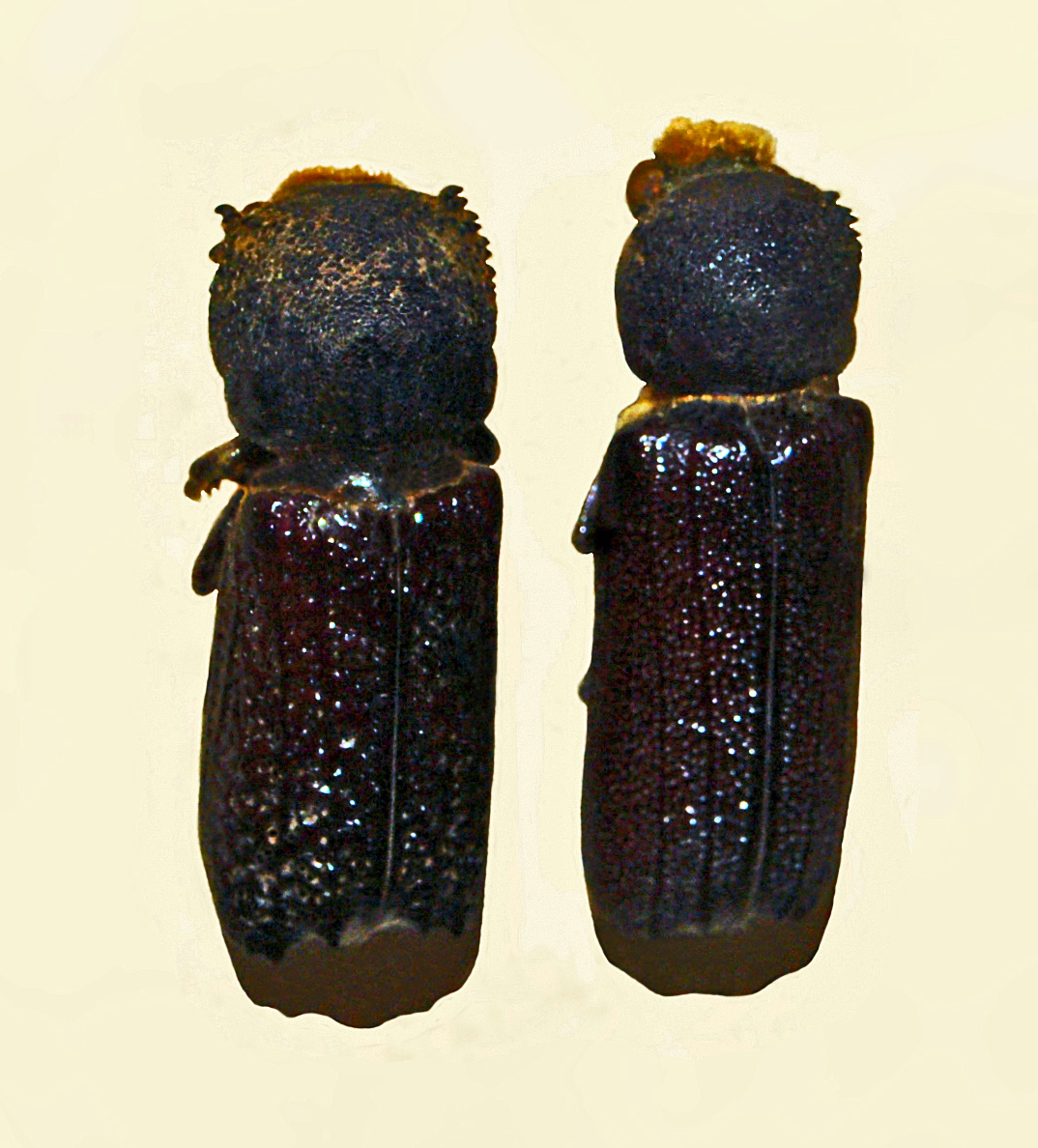
- Apate terebrans from Ethiopia, male and female. Mounted specimen

Scientific classification
- Kingdom: Animalia
- Phylum: Arthropoda
- Clade: Pancrustacea
- Class: Insecta
- Order: Coleoptera
- Suborder: Polyphaga
- Family: Bostrichidae
- Genus: Apate
- Species: A. terebrans

Binomial name
- Apate terebrans Pallas, 1772

Synonyms
- Apate barbifrons Dupont in Dejean, 1833; Apate dispar Fahraeus, 1871; Apate muricatus Fabricius, 1775; Ligniperda terebrans Pallas, 1772

= Apate terebrans =

Species of beetle

Apate terebrans, common names shot-hole borer or trunk borer or girdler, is a species of horned powder-post beetles belonging to the family Bostrichidae.

== Description ==
Apate terebrans can reach a length of 20–32 mm (0.79–1.26 in). The body is black or dark brown, elongated, and somewhat cylindrical. The head is bent downward and scarcely visible from above, its pronotum has rasp-like teeth in the front, the elytra have two or three prominent ridges, and the legs have razor-sharp claws.

These polyphagous boring beetles are a dangerous pest, causing significant damages to plantations and forests. The larvae develop in a variety of timbers, where they bore tunnels, lowering the commercial value of the wood. Adults also feed on living trees and may cause the death of young plants. The lifecycle of these insects usually lasts 1 to 3 years.

Main host plants are cashew (Anacardium occidentale), various Acacia and Citrus species, coffee (Coffea arabica, Coffea robusta), Eucalyptus polycarpa, Khaya species, guava (Psidium guajava), Tectona grandis, Terminalia ivorensis, cocoa (Theobroma cacao) and Triplochiton scleroxylon.

== Distribution ==
This species is native to Africa including Madagascar. It is also widespread in Central and South America. In Europe, it has been reported in Austria, Georgia, Spain, and the United Kingdom.
