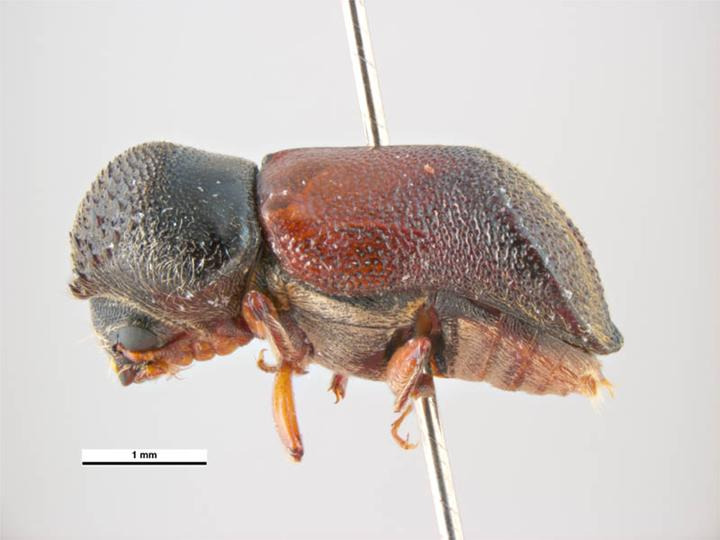

Scientific classification
- Kingdom: Animalia
- Phylum: Arthropoda
- Clade: Pancrustacea
- Class: Insecta
- Order: Coleoptera
- Suborder: Polyphaga
- Family: Bostrichidae
- Genus: Xylopsocus
- Species: X. gibbicollis

Binomial name
- Xylopsocus gibbicollis (Macleay, 1873)

Synonyms
- Rhyzopertha gibbicollis Macleay, 1873

= Xylopsocus gibbicollis =

Species of beetle

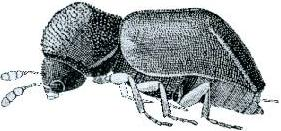

Xylopsocus gibbicollis, common name "common auger beetle", is a species of beetle of the family Bostrichidae.

== Description ==
Adults of X. gibbicollis are black or brown in colour. They are about 2 mm long and 1 mm wide. The "head" (actually the pronotum, which covers the head from above) is rounded. The end of the abdomen is flat, looking as if it has been sliced off. They can be mistaken for Xyleborus dispar, the small fruit tree borer, but that species is smaller and less common in vineyards.

According to the original description by William John Macleay (under the name Rhizopertha gibbicollis), the body length is 1.5 lines (equivalent to about 3.2 mm). The body is short and oblong in shape, black in colour, subnitid (not strongly shiny) and covered in punctures. The thorax (presumably referring to the prothorax) is broader than long, very convex and rough-surfaced, with teeth in front and smooth behind. The elytra are dark red on the basal half, and slope away flatly from near the middle to the apex. This flat surface (the apical declivity) is surrounded by a margin except near the elytral suture on the upper part. The underside of the abdomen has fine white hairs. The legs and antennae are dark red.

As for the immature stages, the larvae are cream to white in colour, legless and have black jaws. At maturity, they are 3 mm long and 1 mm in diameter. Pupae are cream-coloured initially and turn brown as they develop.

== Ecology ==
The common auger beetle is a wood borer. It attacks mainly log or sawn timber, but will also attack dead or dying tissue in trees. It also feeds on sapwood that has a high starch content.

It is a pest of grapevines. Adults are drawn to volatiles emitted by stressed or recently dead plants, where they lay their eggs and where larvae and pupae develop. Adults also bore into grapevines, weakening them via internal girdling. Heavy infestations cause sap to exude from vines.

Xylopsocus gibbicollis has also been listed as a pest of Australian custard apples (a hybrid of sugar apples and cherimoyas) and hail-damaged avocado trees.

The beetle has been found in cortical tissue of dead Albizia lebbeck seedlings. It has also been found in smaller branches of Corymbia torelliana (=Eucalyptus torelliana) burnt by fire.
