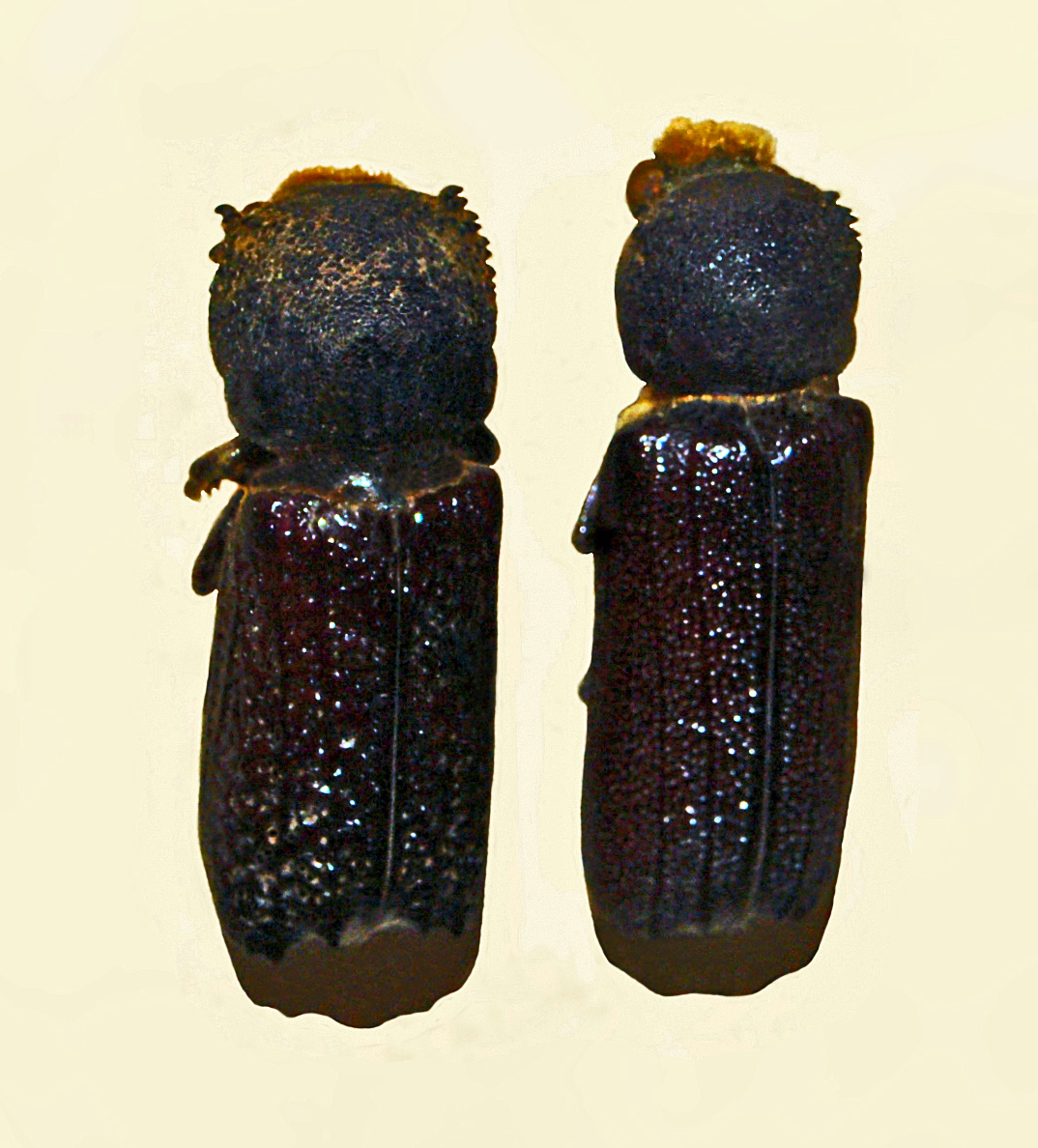
- Apate terebrans from Ethiopia, male and female. Mounted specimen

Scientific classification
- Domain: Eukaryota
- Kingdom: Animalia
- Phylum: Arthropoda
- Class: Insecta
- Order: Coleoptera
- Suborder: Polyphaga
- Family: Bostrichidae
- Subfamily: Bostrichinae
- Genus: Apate; Fabricius, 1775

Synonyms
- Bostrychopsis Lesne, 1899; Ligniperda Pallas, 1772

= Apate (beetle) =

Genus of beetles

Apate is a genus of beetles belonging to the family Bostrichidae.

== List of species ==
- Apate approximate Dupont in Dejean, 1833
- Apate armata Dejean, 1833
- Apate barbata Melsheimer, 1806
- Apate coenobita Dejean, 1833
- Apate cribraria Dejean, 1833
- Apate gysselenii Dejean, 1833
- Apate hamaticollis Dejean, 1833
- Apate nana Dejean, 1833
- Apate niger Melsheimer, 1806
- Apate perplexa Dejean, 1833
- Apate quadrispinosa Dejean, 1833
- Apate rufescens Dejean, 1833
- Apate ruficornis Dejean, 1833
- Apate striatus Melsheimer, 1806
- Apate subdentata Dejean, 1833
- Apate substriata Gysselen in Dejean, 1833
- Apate thoracicornis Dejean, 1833
- Apate westermanni Dejean, 1833
- Apate bicolor Fahraeus, 1871 [South Africa]
- Apate bilabiata Lesne, 1909 [East Africa]
- Apate cephalotes (Olivier, 1790:108) [East and South Africa, Madagascar, Comoros, Mauritius, Reunion]
- Apate degener Murray, 1867 [West Africa, East Africa, Zanzibar]
- Apate ecomata Lesne, 1929 [Somalia]
- Apate geayi Lesne, 1907 [Madagascar]
- Apate indistincta Murray, 1867 [East Africa, South Africa, Mauritius]
- Apate lignicolor Fairmaire, 1883a:95 [Africa, Madagascar]
- Apate monachus Fabricius, 1775 [Africa, South Europe, Arabian Peninsula, Central America]
- Apate perniciosa Gistel, 1857
- Apate raricoma Lesne, 1924 [West Africa]
- Apate reflexa Lesne, 1909 [West Africa]
- Apate scoparia Lesne, 1909 [East Africa]
- Apate subcalva Lesne, 1923:60 [West Africa]
- Apate submedia Walker, 1858 [India, Sri Lanka]
- Apate terebrans (Pallas, 1772)
- Apate tuberculosa Gistel, 1848:443 [Brazil]
