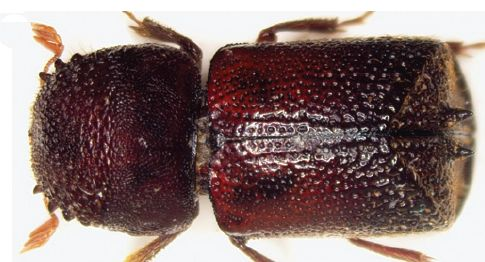

Scientific classification
- Domain: Eukaryota
- Kingdom: Animalia
- Phylum: Arthropoda
- Class: Insecta
- Order: Coleoptera
- Suborder: Polyphaga
- Family: Bostrichidae
- Genus: Sinoxylon
- Species: S. anale

Binomial name
- Sinoxylon anale Lesne, 1897

= Sinoxylon anale =

Species of beetle

Sinoxylon anale is a species of horned powder-post beetle in the family Bostrichidae. It is found in Australia, North America, Southern Asia, and Europe.

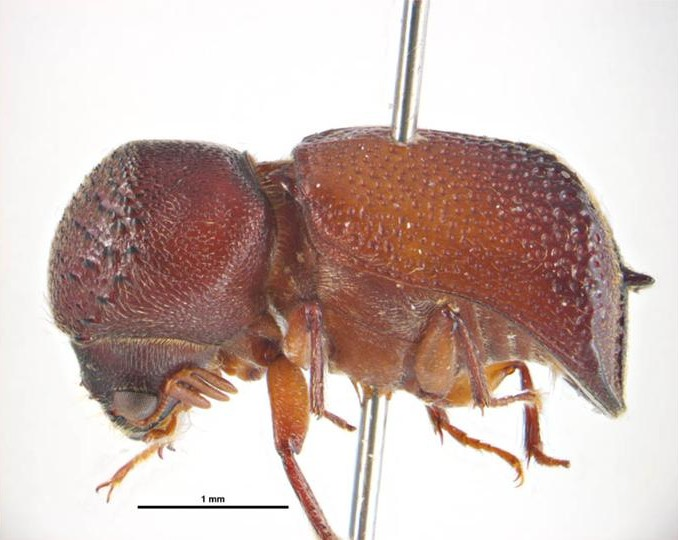
