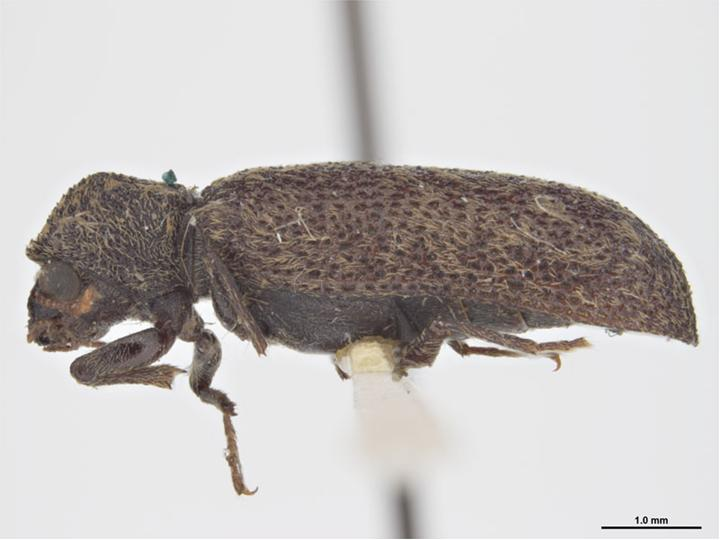
- Lichenophanes angustus

Scientific classification
- Kingdom: Animalia
- Phylum: Arthropoda
- Class: Insecta
- Order: Coleoptera
- Suborder: Polyphaga
- Family: Bostrichidae
- Subfamily: Bostrichinae
- Tribe: Bostrichini
- Genus: Lichenophanes; Lesne, 1899

= Lichenophanes =

Genus of beetles

Lichenophanes is a genus of horned powder-post beetles in the family Bostrichidae. There are more than 40 described species in Lichenophanes.

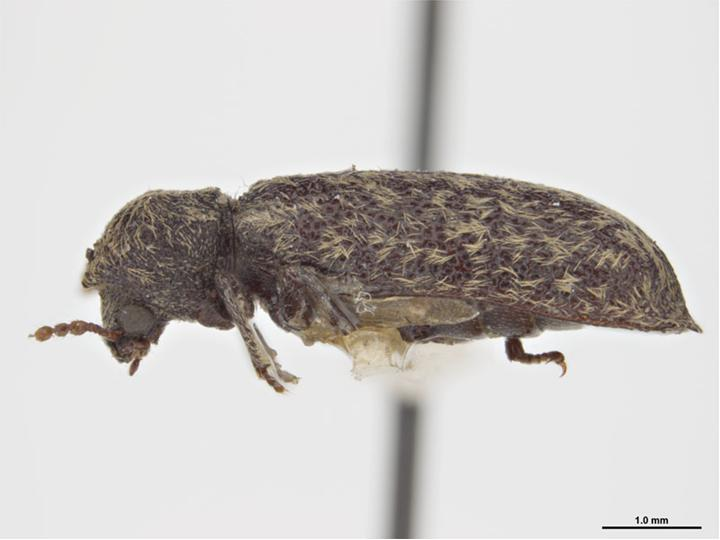
Lichenophanes truncaticollis

== Species ==
These 42 species belong to the genus Lichenophanes:

- Lichenophanes albicans Lesne, 1899
- Lichenophanes angustus (Casey, 1898)
- Lichenophanes arizonicus Fisher, 1950
- Lichenophanes armiger (LeConte, 1866)
- Lichenophanes bechyneorum Vrydagh, 1959
- Lichenophanes bedeli (Lesne, 1895)
- Lichenophanes bicornis (Weber, 1801)
- Lichenophanes californicus (Horn, 1878)
- Lichenophanes carinipennis (Lewis, 1896)
- Lichenophanes caudatus (Lesne, 1895)
- Lichenophanes collarti Vrydagh, 1959
- Lichenophanes corticeus Lesne, 1908
- Lichenophanes egenus Lesne, 1923
- Lichenophanes egregius Lesne, 1934
- Lichenophanes fasciatus (Lesne, 1895)
- Lichenophanes fascicularis (Fåhraeus, 1871)
- Lichenophanes fasciculatus (Fall, 1909)
- Lichenophanes funebris Lesne, 1938
- Lichenophanes indutus Lesne, 1935
- Lichenophanes iniquus (Lesne, 1895)
- Lichenophanes insignitus (Fairmaire, 1883)
- Lichenophanes katanganus Lesne, 1935
- Lichenophanes kunckeli (Lesne, 1895)
- Lichenophanes marmoratus Lesne, 1899
- Lichenophanes martini Lesne, 1899
- Lichenophanes morbillosus (Quedenfeldt, 1887)
- Lichenophanes mutchleri (Casey, 1898)
- Lichenophanes numida Lesne, 1899
- Lichenophanes oberthuri Lesne, 1899
- Lichenophanes penicillatus (Lesne, 1895)
- Lichenophanes percristatus Lesne, 1924
- Lichenophanes perrieri Lesne, 1899
- Lichenophanes plicatus (Guérin-Méneville, 1844)
- Lichenophanes rutilans Reichardt, 1970
- Lichenophanes spectabilis (Lesne, 1895)
- Lichenophanes tristis (Fåhraeus, 1871)
- Lichenophanes truncaticollis (LeConte, 1866)
- Lichenophanes tuberosus Lesne, 1934
- Lichenophanes varius (Illiger, 1801)
- Lichenophanes verrucosus (Gorham, 1883)
- Lichenophanes weissi Lesne, 1908
- Lichenophanes zanzibaricus Lesne, 1925
