= Barbicambarus simmonsi =

- Critically Imperiled (NatureServe)

Scientific classification
- Domain: Eukaryota
- Kingdom: Animalia
- Phylum: Arthropoda
- Class: Malacostraca
- Order: Decapoda
- Suborder: Pleocyemata
- Family: Cambaridae
- Genus: Barbicambarus
- Species: B. simmonsi

Binomial name
- Barbicambarus simmonsi (Taylor & Schuster, 2010)

Species of crayfish

Barbicambarus simmonsi is a species of giant crayfish discovered in southern Tennessee in 2010. The discovery was announced in January 2011.

The animal was discovered in Shoal Creek, a stream in southern Tennessee that ultimately drains into the Tennessee River. The first specimen was discovered by and named for Tennessee Valley Authority scientist Jeffrey Simmons in 2010. University of Illinois aquatic biologist Christopher A. Taylor and Guenter A. Schuster of Eastern Kentucky University found a second specimen and authored the paper announcing the discovery of the new species. The creek has been studied for half a century, so this species is believed to be rare. Taylor further suggests that discovery of such a large species there now indicates that more money should be spent on research inside the United States.
