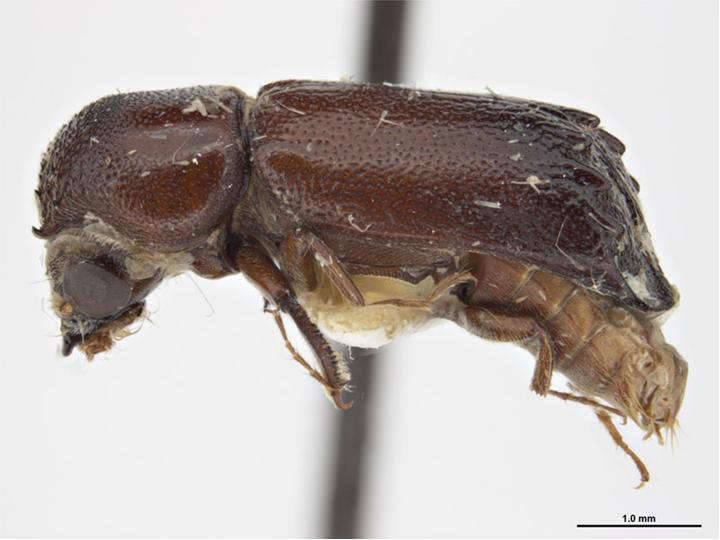
- Tetrapriocera longicornis

Scientific classification
- Kingdom: Animalia
- Phylum: Arthropoda
- Class: Insecta
- Order: Coleoptera
- Suborder: Polyphaga
- Family: Bostrichidae
- Subfamily: Bostrichinae
- Tribe: Xyloperthini
- Genus: Tetrapriocera; Horn, 1878

= Tetrapriocera =

Genus of beetles

Tetrapriocera is a genus of horned powder-post beetles in the family Bostrichidae. There are at least four described species in Tetrapriocera.

== Species ==
These four species belong to the genus Tetrapriocera:

- Tetrapriocera caprina Lesne, 1931
- Tetrapriocera defracta Lesne, 1901
- Tetrapriocera longicornis (Olivier, 1795)
- Tetrapriocera oceanina Lesne, 1901
