= Sinoxylon ceratoniae =

Scientific classification
- Kingdom: Animalia
- Phylum: Arthropoda
- Class: Insecta
- Order: Coleoptera
- Suborder: Polyphaga
- Family: Bostrichidae
- Genus: Sinoxylon
- Species: S. ceratoniae

Binomial name
- Sinoxylon ceratoniae (Linnaeus, 1758)

Species of beetle

Sinoxylon ceratoniae is a species of horned powder-post beetles in the family Bostrichidae. It is found in Africa, Europe, and Northern Asia (excluding China).
