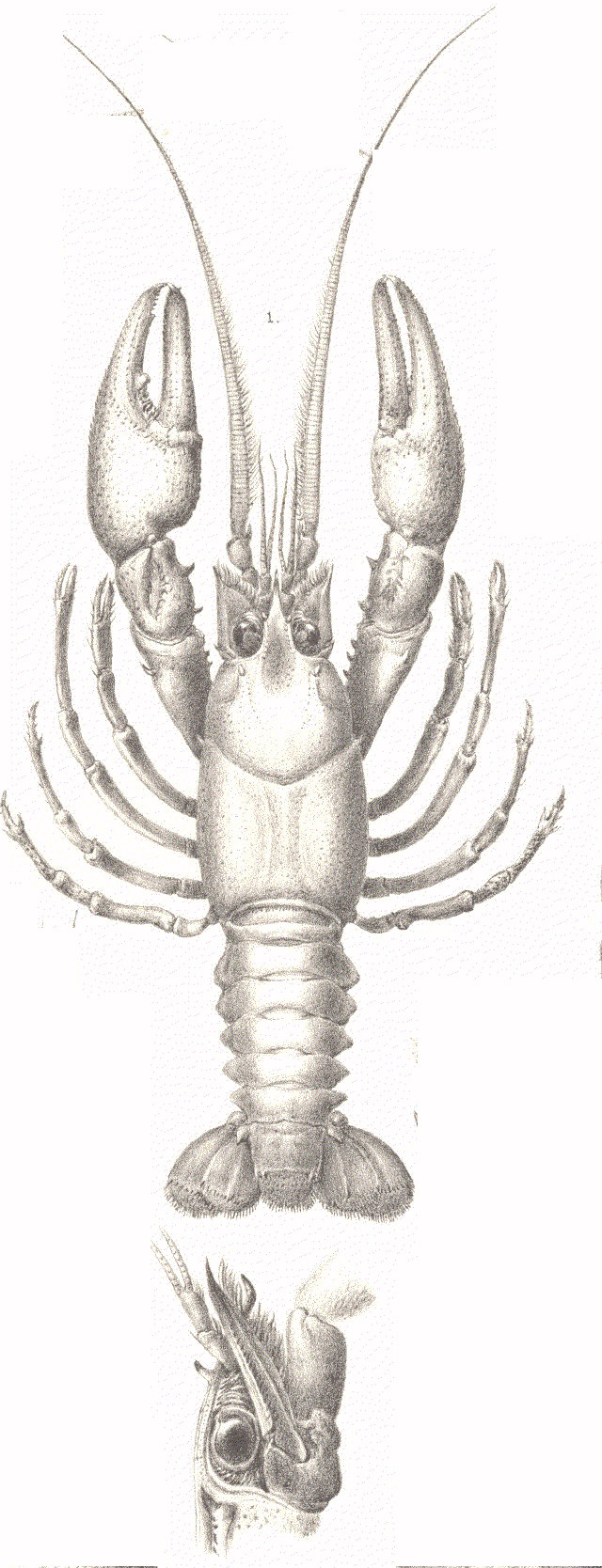
- Barbicambarus

Scientific classification
- Domain: Eukaryota
- Kingdom: Animalia
- Phylum: Arthropoda
- Class: Malacostraca
- Order: Decapoda
- Suborder: Pleocyemata
- Family: Cambaridae
- Genus: Barbicambarus; Hobbs, 1969

Species
- Barbicambarus cornutus; Barbicambarus simmonsi

= Barbicambarus =

Genus of crayfishes

Barbicambarus is a genus of freshwater crayfish found in Tennessee and Kentucky in the United States. It comprises two species:

- Barbicambarus cornutus (Faxon, 1884)
- Barbicambarus simmonsi Taylor & Schuster, 2010
