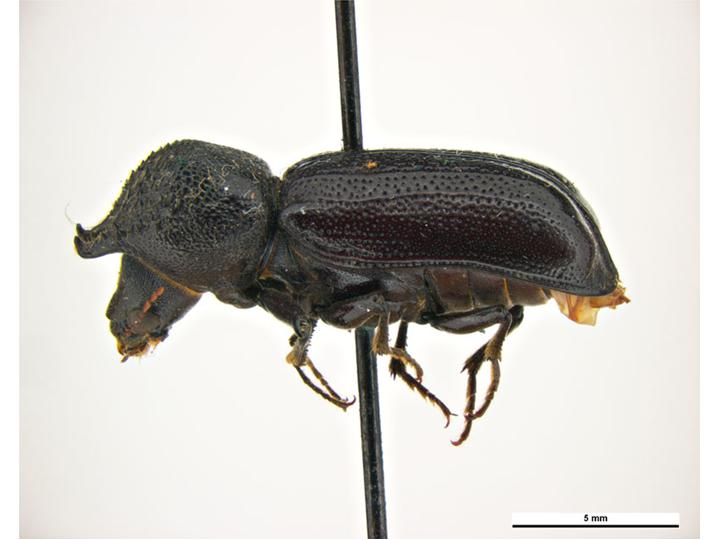
- Apatides

Scientific classification
- Kingdom: Animalia
- Phylum: Arthropoda
- Class: Insecta
- Order: Coleoptera
- Suborder: Polyphaga
- Family: Bostrichidae
- Subfamily: Bostrichinae
- Tribe: Bostrichini
- Genus: Apatides; Casey, 1898

= Apatides =

Genus of beetles

Apatides is a genus of horned powder-post beetles in the family Bostrichidae. There are at least four described species in Apatides.

== Species ==
These four species belong to the genus Apatides:

- Apatides fortis (LeConte, 1866) (horned powderpost beetle)
- Apatides pollens Casey
- Apatides puncticeps Casey
- Apatides robustus Casey
