= Shothole borer =

Shothole borer, shot hole borer, or shot-hole borer may refer to any of several insects:

- Bostrychoplites cornutus, horned shothole borer
- Euwallacea
  - Euwallacea fornicatus, tea shothole borer or polyphagous shothole borer
  - Euwallacea kuroshio, kuroshio shothole borer
  - Euwallacea interjectus, greater shothole borer
- Scolytus rugulosus
- Xyleborinus saxesenii, lesser shothole borer
- Xyleborus dispar, European shothole borer
- Xylosandrus compactus
