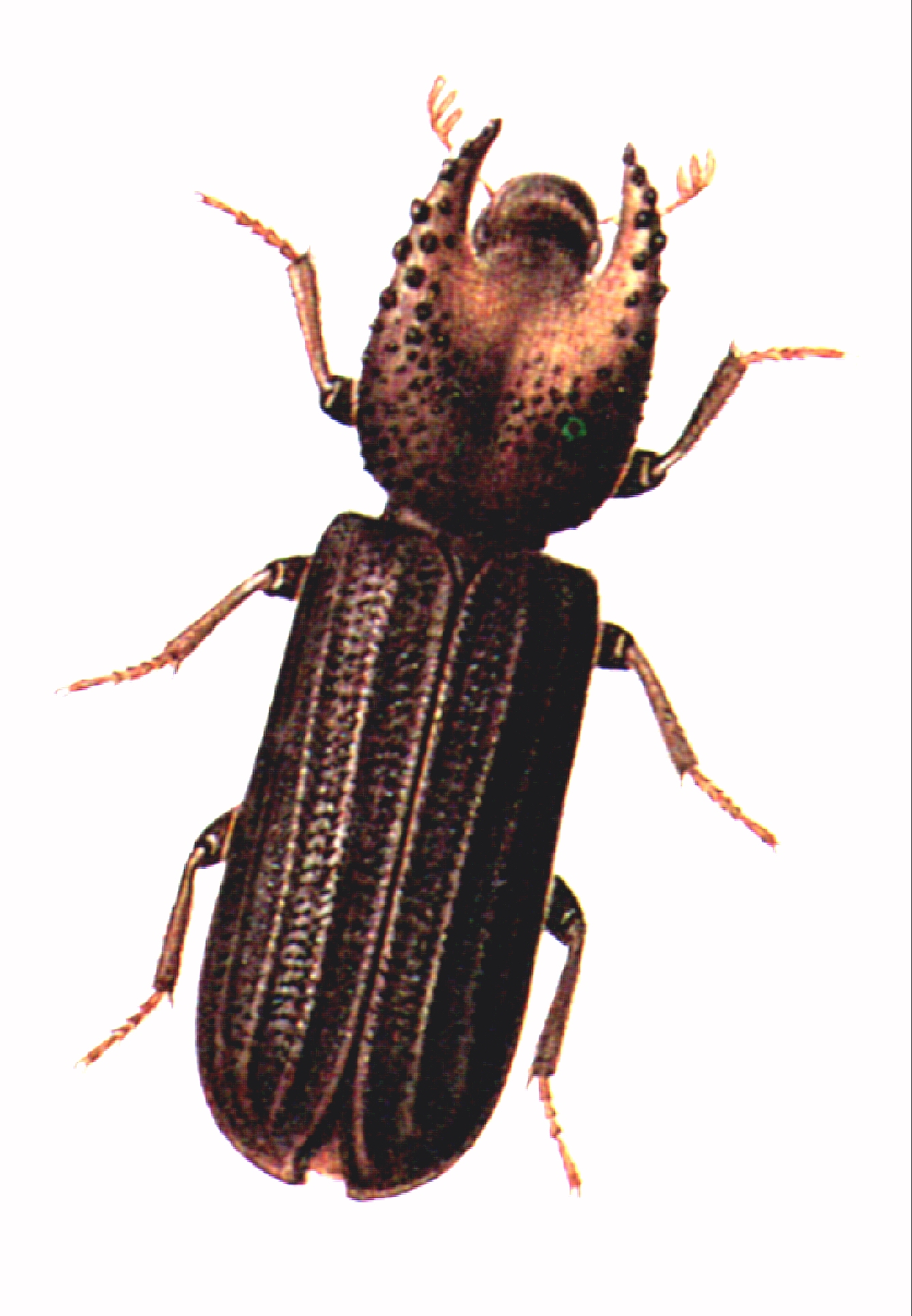
- Bostrychoplites cornutus

Scientific classification
- Kingdom: Animalia
- Phylum: Arthropoda
- Class: Insecta
- Order: Coleoptera
- Suborder: Polyphaga
- Family: Bostrichidae
- Subfamily: Bostrichinae
- Tribe: Bostrichini
- Genus: Bostrychoplites; Lesne, 1899

Selected species
- Bostrychoplites cornutus

= Bostrychoplites =

Genus of beetles

Bostrychoplites is a genus of beetle native to the Afro-tropical region. Its presence in Europe is doubtful.
