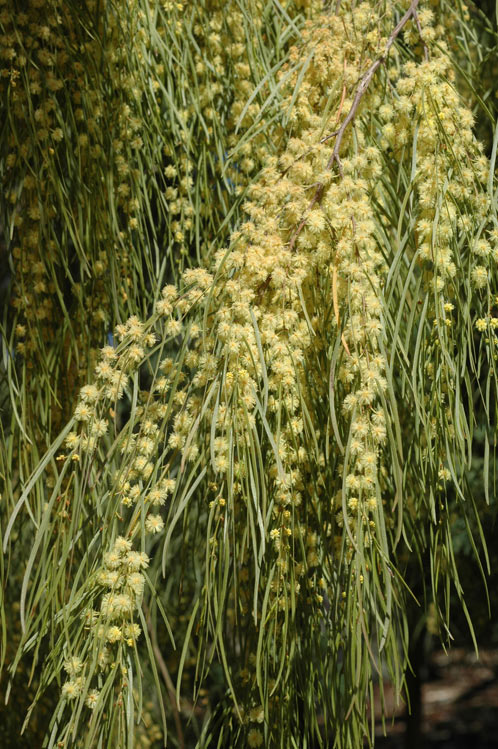

Scientific classification
- Kingdom: Plantae
- Clade: Tracheophytes
- Clade: Angiosperms
- Clade: Eudicots
- Clade: Rosids
- Order: Fabales
- Family: Fabaceae
- Subfamily: Caesalpinioideae
- Clade: Mimosoid clade
- Genus: Acacia
- Species: A. cognata

Binomial name
- Acacia cognata Domin
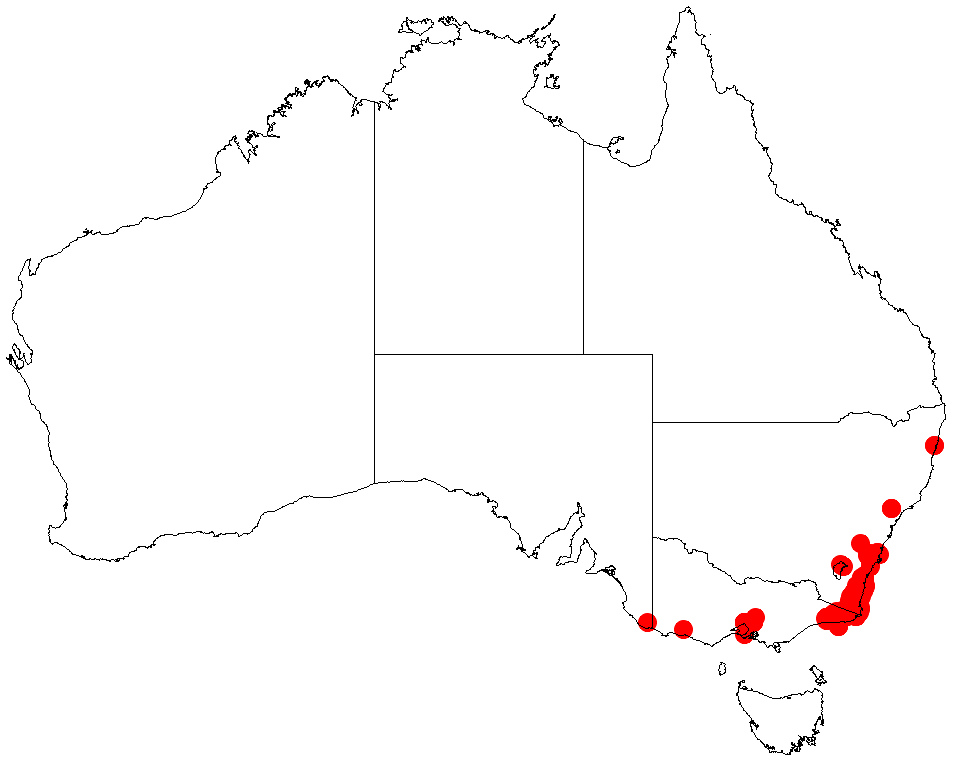
- Occurrence data from AVH

Synonyms
- Acacia subporosa var. linearis Benth. Racosperma cognatum (Domin) Pedley

= Acacia cognata =

Bower wattle

Species of legume

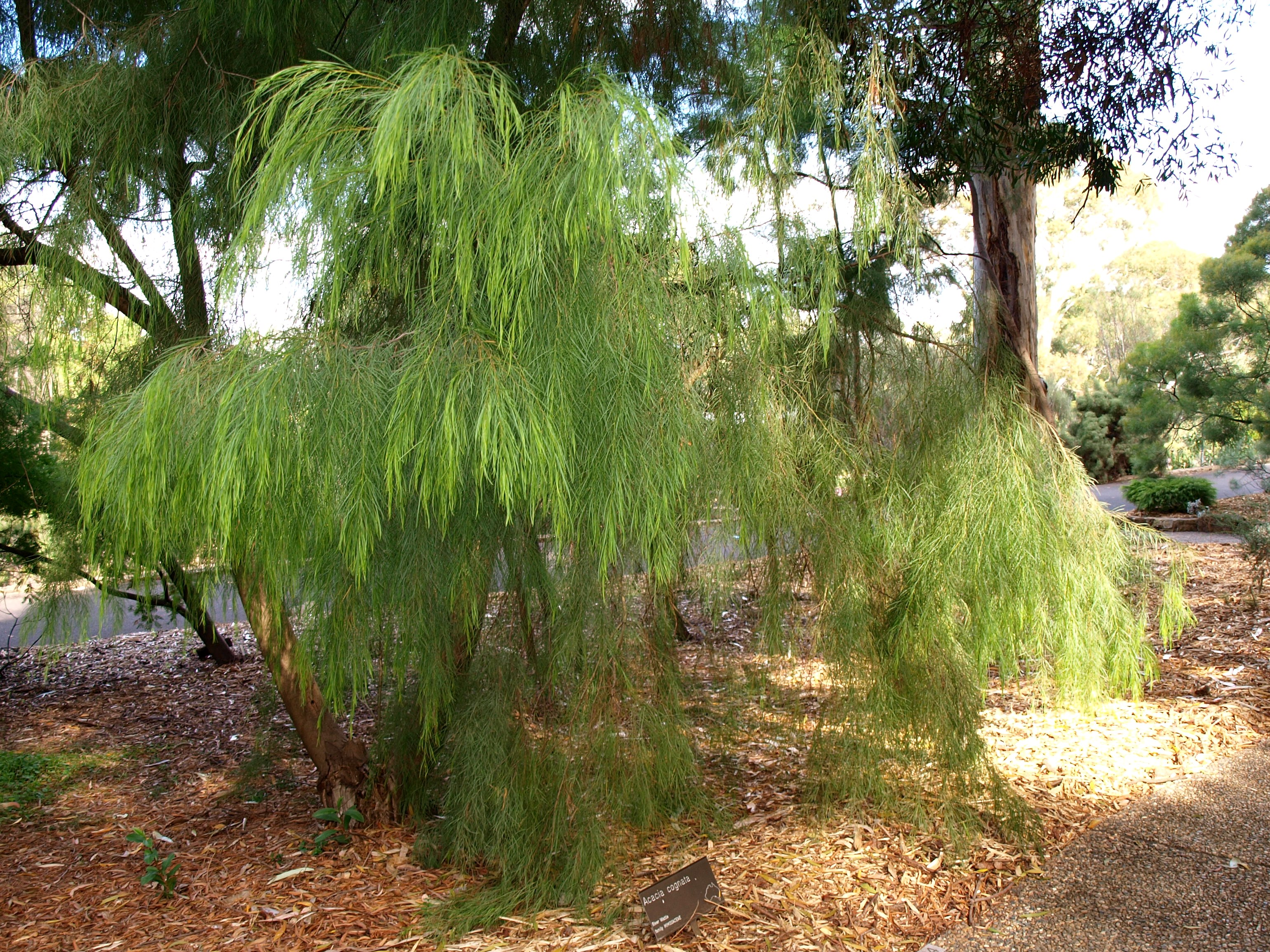
Habit in the Australian National Botanic Gardens

Acacia cognata, commonly known as bower wattle, river wattle or narrow-leaf bower-wattle, is a species of flowering plant in the family Fabaceae and is endemic to south-eastern continental Australia. It is an erect or spreading shrub or tree with willowly and arching branchlets, narrowly linear phyllodes, spherical heads of pale lemon-yellow flowers and linear, papery, glabrous, pods.

== Description ==
Acacia cognata is an erect or spreading shrub or tree that typically grows to a height of 3–10 m (9.8–32.8 ft) and is often sticky. Its branchlets are usually glabrous, willowy and arching. Its bark is smooth, grey or greyish brown. The phyllodes are linear to very narrowly elliptic,40–100 mm (1.6–3.9 in) long, 1–3.5 mm (0.039–0.138 in) wide and dark green to yellowish green. The flowers are borne in two spherical heads in axils on a peduncle usually 3–6 mm (0.12–0.24 in) long, each head 4–5 mm (0.16–0.20 in) in diameter with 10 to 17 pale lemon-yellow flowers. Flowering occurs from July to November, and the pods are linear, papery and glabrous, up to 100 mm (3.9 in) long, 2–4 mm (0.079–0.157 in) wide and slightly raised over seeds. The seeds are dark brown, oblong, 4.0–4.5 mm (0.16–0.18 in) long with an aril on the end.

== Taxonomy ==
Acacia cognata was first formally described in 1926 by Karel Domin in Bibliotheca Botanica. The specific epithet (cognata) means 'related', because Domin regarded the species as being very close to Acacia subporosa.

== Distribution and habitat ==
Bower wattle grows in granite-based soils in moist gullies and hillsides in forest. It occurs on the coastal plain and adjacent foothills of the Great Dividing Range south from the Nowra district in New South Wales to near Orbost with an isolated occurrence near Pokolbin in New South Wales.

== Cultivars ==
A number of cultivars have been developed, including "Lime Magik", "Cousin It", "Copper Tips", "Green Mist", "Mini Cog" Fettucine and "Bower Beauty".
