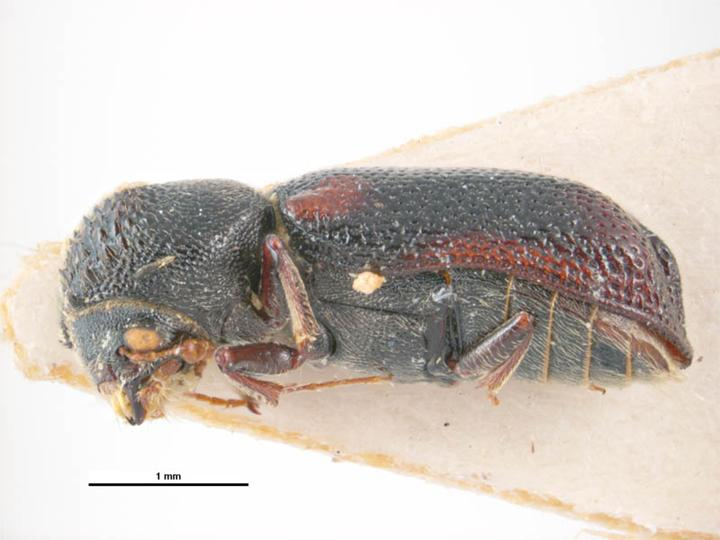

Scientific classification
- Domain: Eukaryota
- Kingdom: Animalia
- Phylum: Arthropoda
- Class: Insecta
- Order: Coleoptera
- Suborder: Polyphaga
- Family: Bostrichidae
- Genus: Micrapate
- Species: M. bilobata

Binomial name
- Micrapate bilobata Fisher, 1950

= Micrapate bilobata =

Species of beetle

Micrapate bilobata is a species of horned powder-post beetle in the family Bostrichidae. It is found in North America.
