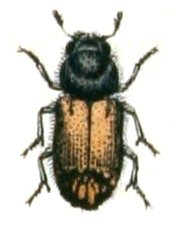
- Sinoxylon perforans

Scientific classification
- Kingdom: Animalia
- Phylum: Arthropoda
- Class: Insecta
- Order: Coleoptera
- Suborder: Polyphaga
- Family: Bostrichidae
- Subfamily: Bostrichinae
- Tribe: Sinoxylini
- Genus: Sinoxylon; Duftschmid, 1825

Selected species
- Sinoxylon anale; Sinoxylon ceratoniae; Sinoxylon conigerum; Sinoxylon perforans; Sinoxylon ruficorne; Sinoxylon sexdentatum

= Sinoxylon =

Genus of beetles

Sinoxylon is a genus of beetle native to Europe, the Afro-tropical region, the Australian region, the Near East, the Nearctic, the Neotropical region, North Africa and the Oriental region.
