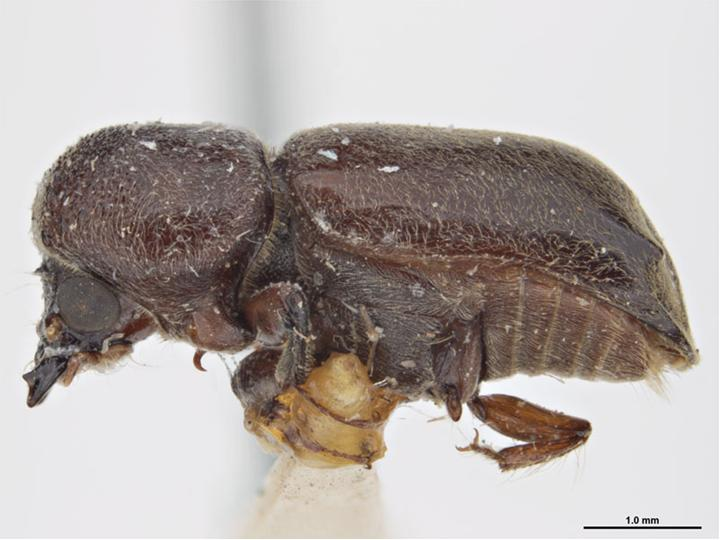

Scientific classification
- Kingdom: Animalia
- Phylum: Arthropoda
- Class: Insecta
- Order: Coleoptera
- Suborder: Polyphaga
- Family: Bostrichidae
- Tribe: Xyloperthini
- Genus: Xylomeira; Lesne, 1901
- Species: X. tridens

Binomial name
- Xylomeira tridens (Fabricius, 1792)

= Xylomeira =

Genus of beetles

Xylomeira is a genus of horned powder-post beetles in the family Bostrichidae. There is one described species in Xylomeira, X. tridens.
