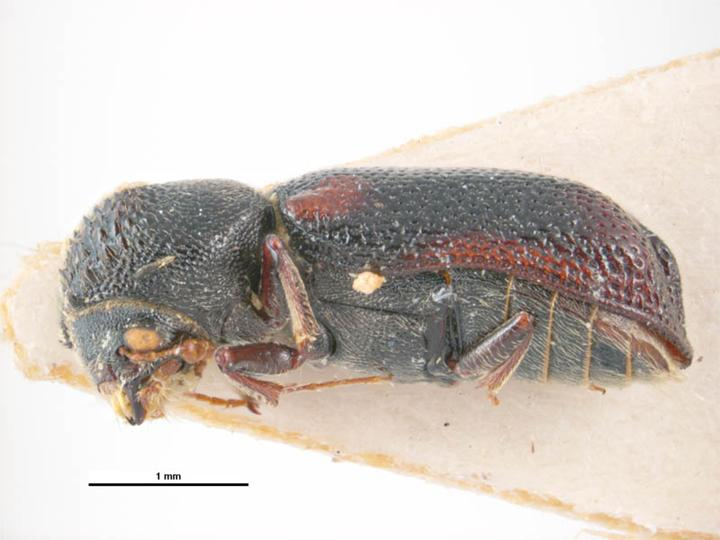
- Micrapate bilobata

Scientific classification
- Kingdom: Animalia
- Phylum: Arthropoda
- Clade: Pancrustacea
- Class: Insecta
- Order: Coleoptera
- Suborder: Polyphaga
- Family: Bostrichidae
- Tribe: Bostrichini
- Genus: Micrapate; Casey, 1898

= Micrapate =

Genus of beetles

Micrapate is a genus of horned powder-post beetles in the family Bostrichidae. There are at least 40 described species in Micrapate.

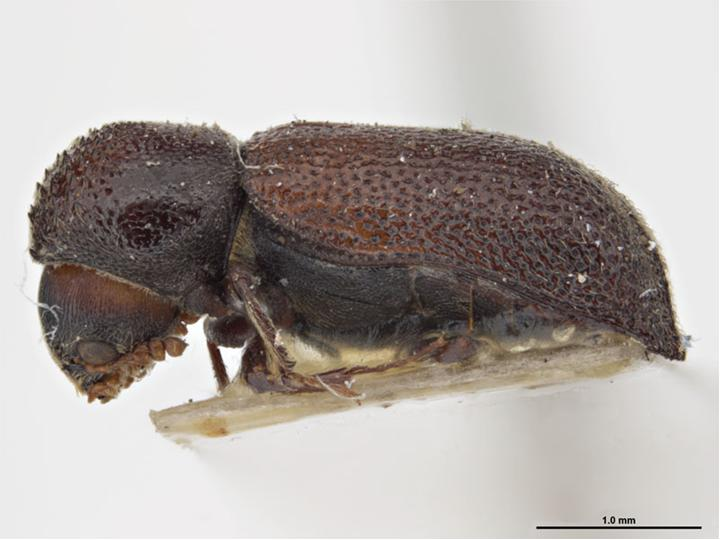
Micrapate dinoderoides

== Species ==
These 42 species belong to the genus Micrapate:

- Micrapate albertiana Lesne, 1943^{i c g}
- Micrapate amplicollis (Lesne, 1899)^{i c g}
- Micrapate atra (Lesne, 1899)^{i c g}
- Micrapate bicostula Lesne, 1906^{i c g}
- Micrapate bilobata Fisher, 1950^{i c g b}
- Micrapate brasiliensis (Lesne, 1899)^{i c g}
- Micrapate brevipes (Lesne, 1899)^{i c g}
- Micrapate bruchi Lesne, 1931^{i c g}
- Micrapate brunnipes (Fabricius, 1801)^{i c g}
- Micrapate catamarcana Lesne, 1931^{i c g}
- Micrapate cordobiana Lesne, 1931^{i c g}
- Micrapate cribripennis (Lesne, 1899)^{i c g}
- Micrapate cristicauda Casey, 1898^{i c g b}
- Micrapate dinoderoides (Horn, 1878)^{i c g b}
- Micrapate discrepans Lesne, 1939^{i c g}
- Micrapate exigua (Lesne, 1899)^{i c g}
- Micrapate foraminata Lesne, 1906^{i c g}
- Micrapate fusca (Lesne, 1899)^{i c g}
- Micrapate germaini (Lesne, 1899)^{i c g}
- Micrapate guatemalensis Lesne, 1906^{i c g}
- Micrapate horni (Lesne, 1899)^{i c g}
- Micrapate humeralis (Blanchard, 1851)^{i c g}
- Micrapate kiangana Lesne, 1935^{i c g}
- Micrapate labialis Lesne, 1906^{i c g}
- Micrapate leechi Vrydagh, 1960^{i c g}
- Micrapate mexicana Fisher, 1950^{i c g}
- Micrapate neglecta Lesne, 1906^{i c g}
- Micrapate obesa (Lesne, 1899)^{i c g}
- Micrapate pinguis Lesne, 1939^{i c g}
- Micrapate puberula Lesne, 1906^{i c g}
- Micrapate puncticollis (von Kiesenwetter, 1877)^{g}
- Micrapate pupulus Lesne, 1906^{i c g}
- Micrapate quadraticollis (Lesne, 1899)^{i c g}
- Micrapate scabrata (Erichson, 1847)^{i c g}
- Micrapate scapularis (Gorham, 1883)^{i c g}
- Micrapate schoutedeni Lesne, 1935^{i c g}
- Micrapate sericeicollis Lesne, 1906^{i c g}
- Micrapate simplicipennis (Lesne, 1895)^{i c g}
- Micrapate spinula Liu, 2024^{i c g}
- Micrapate straeleni Vrydagh, 1954^{i c g}
- Micrapate unguiculata Lesne, 1906^{i c g}
- Micrapate wagneri Lesne, 1906^{i c g}
- Micrapate xyloperthoides (Jacquelin du Val, 1859)^{i c g}

Data sources: i = ITIS, c = Catalogue of Life, g = GBIF, b = Bugguide.net
