= Barbicambarus cornutus =

Conservation status
- Least Concern (IUCN 3.1)

- Apparently Secure (NatureServe)

Scientific classification
- Kingdom: Animalia
- Phylum: Arthropoda
- Class: Malacostraca
- Order: Decapoda
- Suborder: Pleocyemata
- Family: Cambaridae
- Genus: Barbicambarus
- Species: B. cornutus

Binomial name
- Barbicambarus cornutus (Faxon, 1884)

Synonyms
- Cambarus cornutus (Faxon, 1884)

Species of crayfish

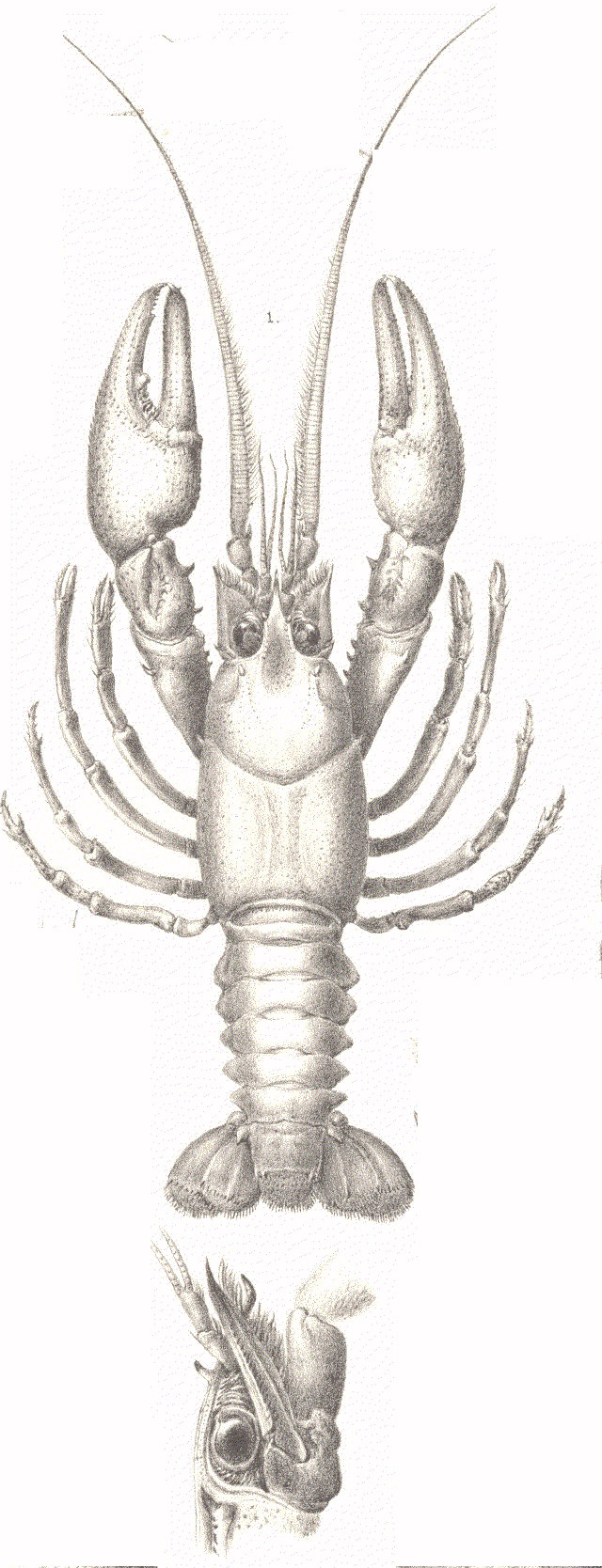

Barbicambarus cornutus is a species of crayfish found only in the Barren River and Green River systems of Tennessee and Kentucky. It is one of the largest crayfish in North America, reaching lengths of up to 9 inches (230 mm), and its antennae are distinctive in being fringed. Although it was first described in 1884, it was not seen again until the 1960s. The species is sometimes called the bottlebrush crayfish.
