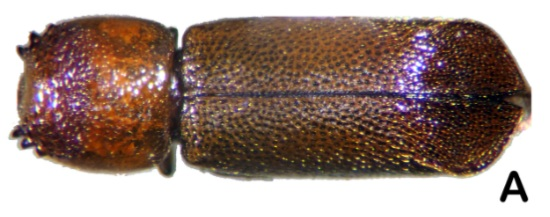

Scientific classification
- Kingdom: Animalia
- Phylum: Arthropoda
- Class: Insecta
- Order: Coleoptera
- Suborder: Polyphaga
- Family: Bostrichidae
- Genus: Plesioxylion
- Species: P. gambianus

Binomial name
- Plesioxylion gambianus (Borowski, 2018)

Synonyms
- Amintinus gambianus Borowski, 2018

= Plesioxylion =

Genus of beetles

Plesioxylion is a genus of horned powder-post beetles in the family Bostrichidae. It consists of one species, Plesioxylion gambianus. It is found in Mali, Senegal and Gambia.

== Description ==
Adults reach a length of about 2.4‒3.2 mm (males) and 3 mm (females). Males are dark brown to black with the antennae, palps, femora, tibiae (except for the protibiae) yellowish-brown. The coxae and protibiae are brown. Females are reddish brown with the antennae, palps, coxae, femora, tibiae (except for the protibiae) yellowish-brown. The protibiae are brown.
