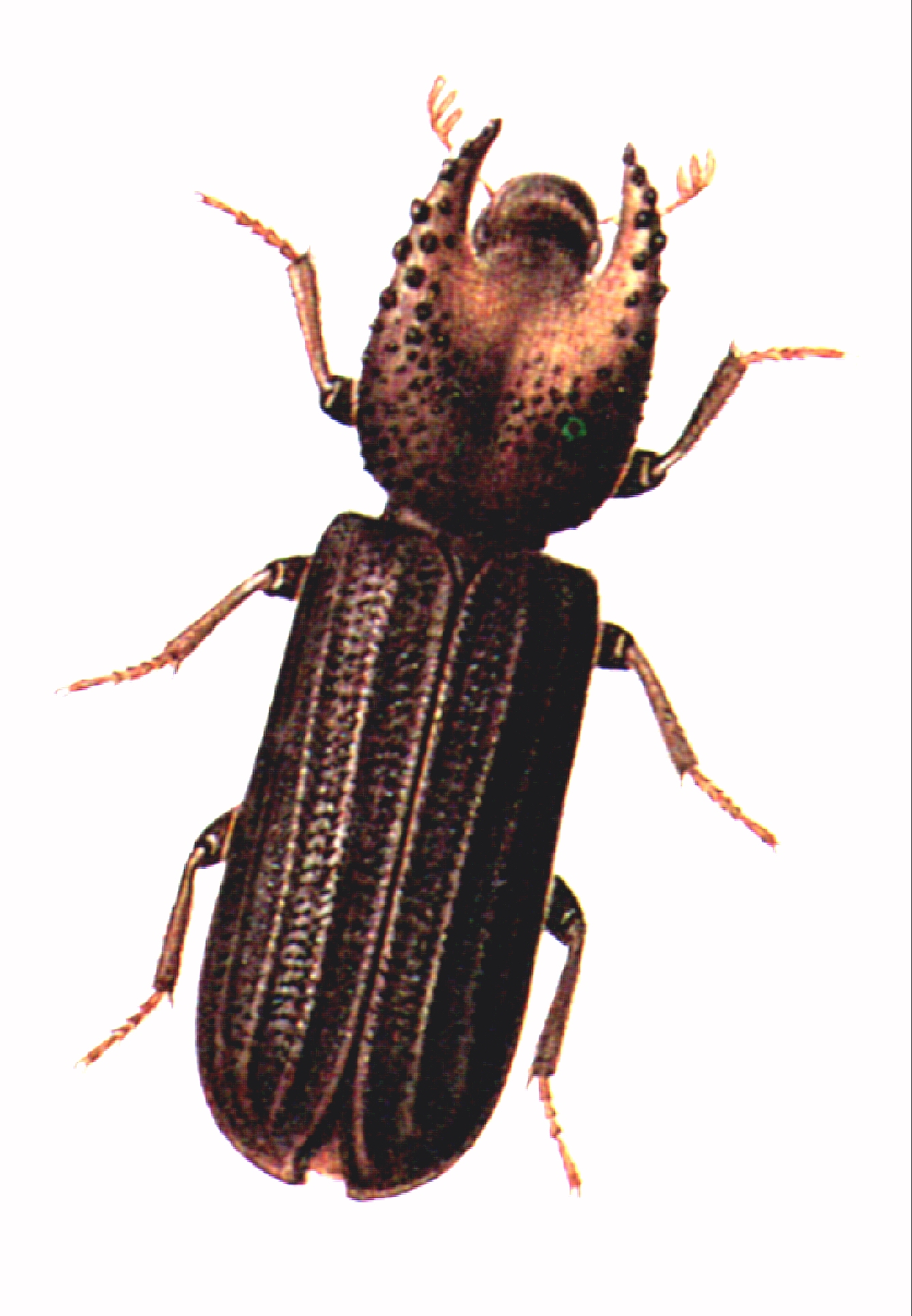

Scientific classification
- Kingdom: Animalia
- Phylum: Arthropoda
- Clade: Pancrustacea
- Class: Insecta
- Order: Coleoptera
- Suborder: Polyphaga
- Family: Bostrichidae
- Genus: Bostrychoplites
- Species: B. cornutus

Binomial name
- Bostrychoplites cornutus (Olivier, 1790)

= Bostrychoplites cornutus =

Species of beetle

Bostrychoplites cornutus is a beetle species in the genus Bostrychoplites. Pupae have been found in wood of deciduous trees. The species has been introduced to many countries in Africa south of the Sahara Desert, including Gambia.
