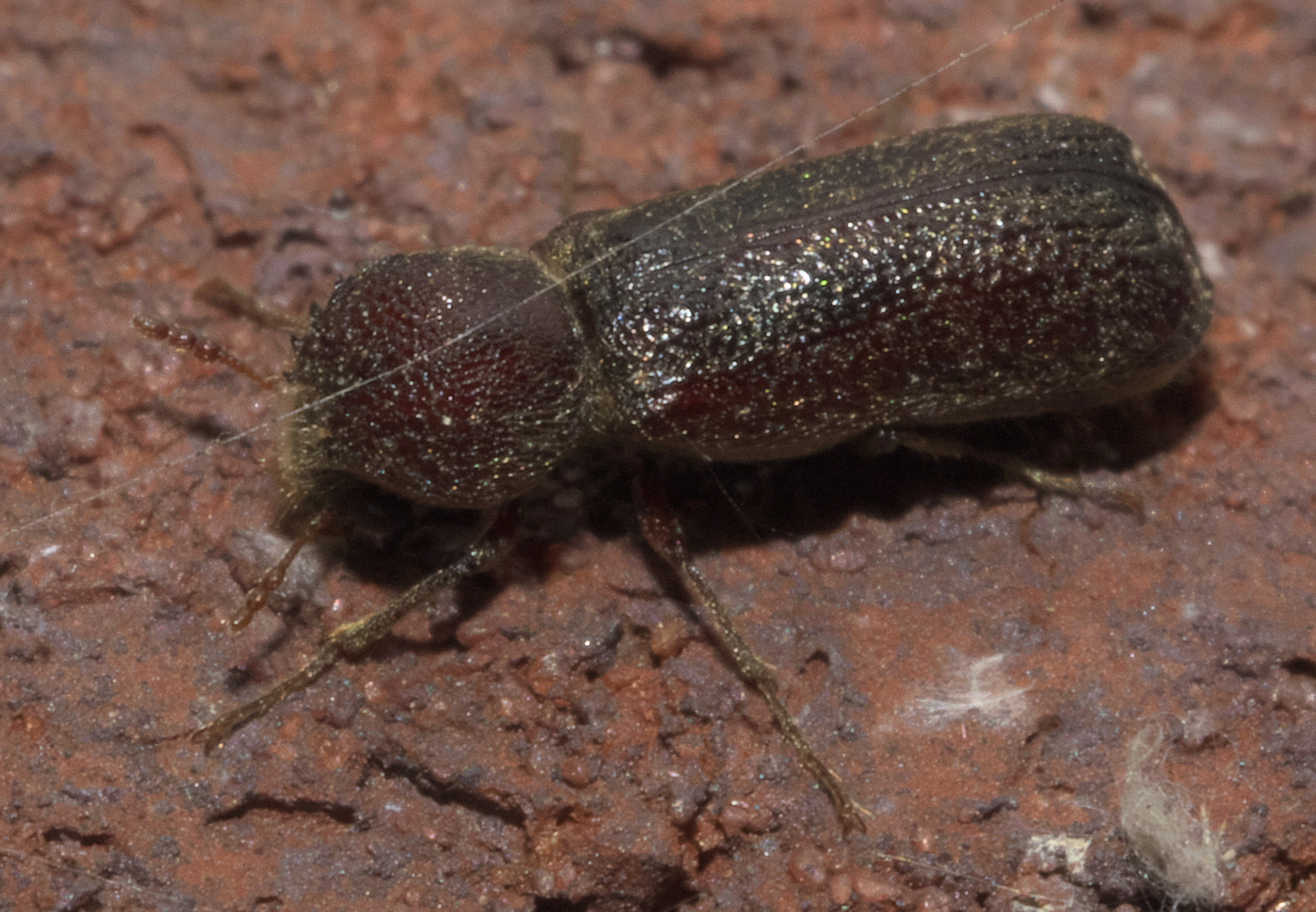
- Amphicerus

Scientific classification
- Kingdom: Animalia
- Phylum: Arthropoda
- Class: Insecta
- Order: Coleoptera
- Suborder: Polyphaga
- Family: Bostrichidae
- Subfamily: Bostrichinae
- Tribe: Bostrichini; Latreille, 1802

= Bostrichini =

Tribe of beetles

Bostrichini is a tribe of horned powder-post beetles in the family Bostrichidae. There are about 16 genera and at least 150 described species in Bostrichini.

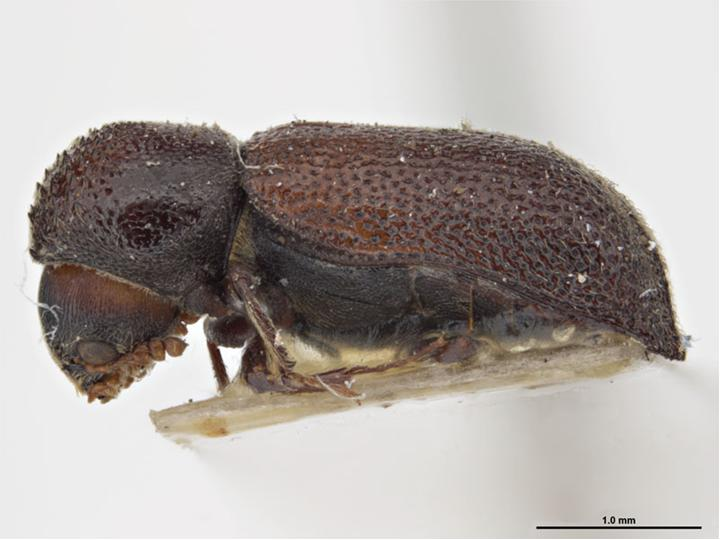
Micrapate dinoderoides

== Genera ==
These 16 genera belong to the tribe Bostrichini:

- Amphicerus LeConte, 1861
- Apatides Casey, 1898
- Bostrichus Geoffroy, 1762
- Bostrycharis Lesne, 1925
- Bostrychoplites Lesne, 1899
- Bostrychopsis Lesne, 1899
- Calophorus Lesne, 1906
- Dexicrates Lesne, 1899
- Dolichobostrychus Lesne, 1899
- Heterobostrychus Lesne, 1899
- Lichenophanes Lesne, 1899
- Megabostrichus Chûjô, 1964
- Micrapate Casey, 1898
- Neoterius Lesne, 1899
- Parabostrychus Lesne, 1899
- Sinoxylodes Lesne, 1899
