= Twig borer =

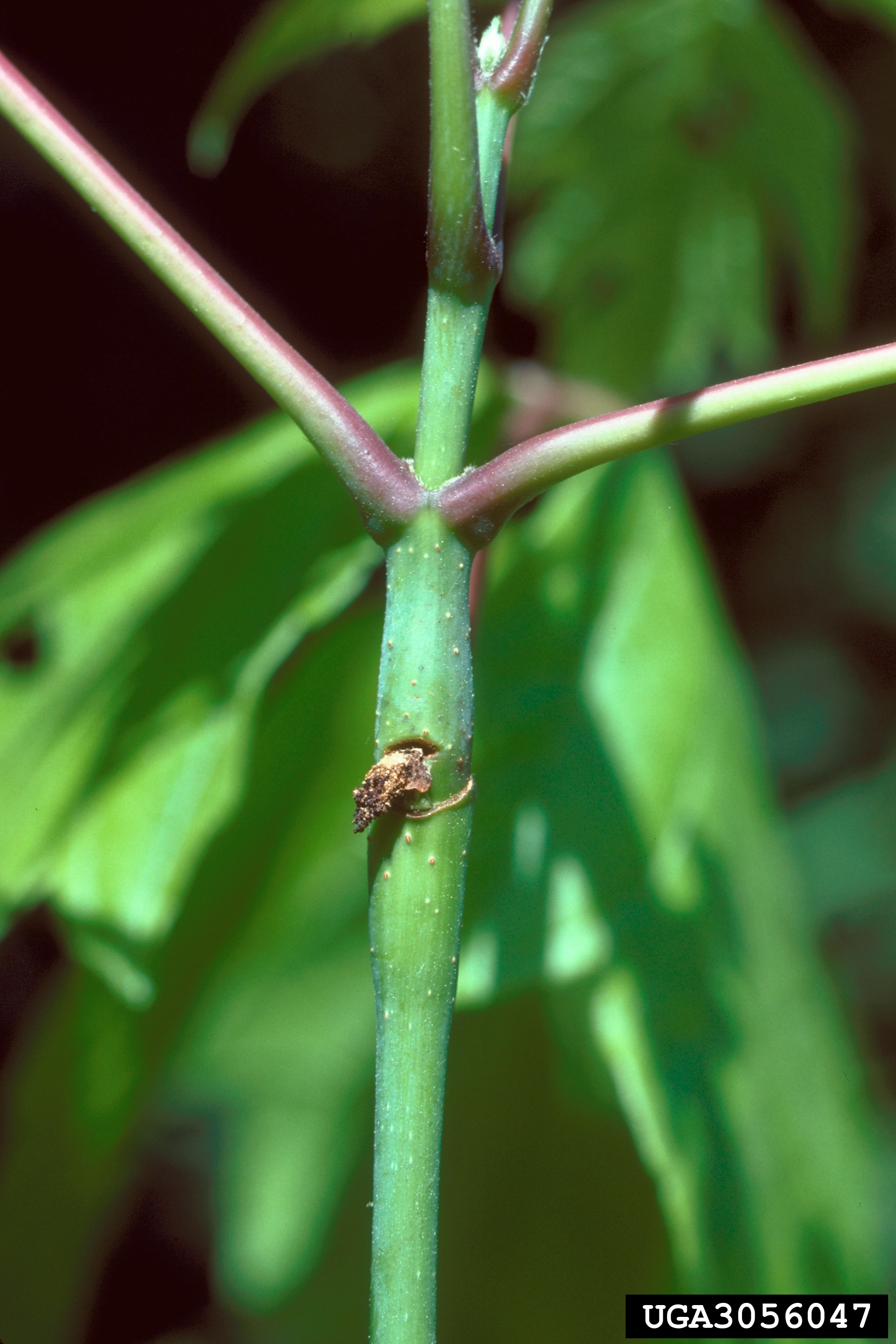
damage on Acer negundo from a boxelder twig borer Proteoteras willingana including twig swelling with frass at entrance hole

Twig borers are a number of species of beetles and moths that chew holes into small branches of trees and shrubs. Many of these insects are agricultural pests. Animals that are called twig borers include:

== Beetles ==
=== Family Bostrichidae ===
- Amphicerus bicaudatus (apple twig borer or grape cane borer)
- Amphicerus bimaculatus (grape cane borer beetle)
- Melalgus confertus (branch and twig borer)

=== Family Curculionidae ===
- Xylosandrus compactus (black twig borer or coffee twig borer)

=== Family Cerambycidae ===
- Chlorophorus varius (grape wood borer)
- Bacchisa fortunei (blue pear twig borer)
- Oberea tripunctata (dogwood twig borer)
- Oberea delongi (poplar twig borer)
- Xylotrechus pyrrhoderus (grape twig borer)

== Moths ==
=== Family Gelechiidae ===
- Coleotechnites bacchariella (coyote brush twig borer moth)
- Anarsia lineatella (peach twig borer)

=== Family Crambidae ===
- Terastia meticulosalis (erythrina twigborer)

=== Family Tortricidae ===
- Gypsonoma haimbachiana (cottonwood twig borer)
- Hystrichophora taleana (indigobush twig borer)
- Ecdytolopha insiticiana (locust twig borer)

==== Genus Proteoteras ====
- Proteoteras willingana (eastern boxelder twig borer moth)
- Proteoteras aesculana (maple twig borer)
- Proteoteras crescentana (northern boxelder twig borer moth)
- Proteoteras arizonae (western boxelder twig borer moth)
