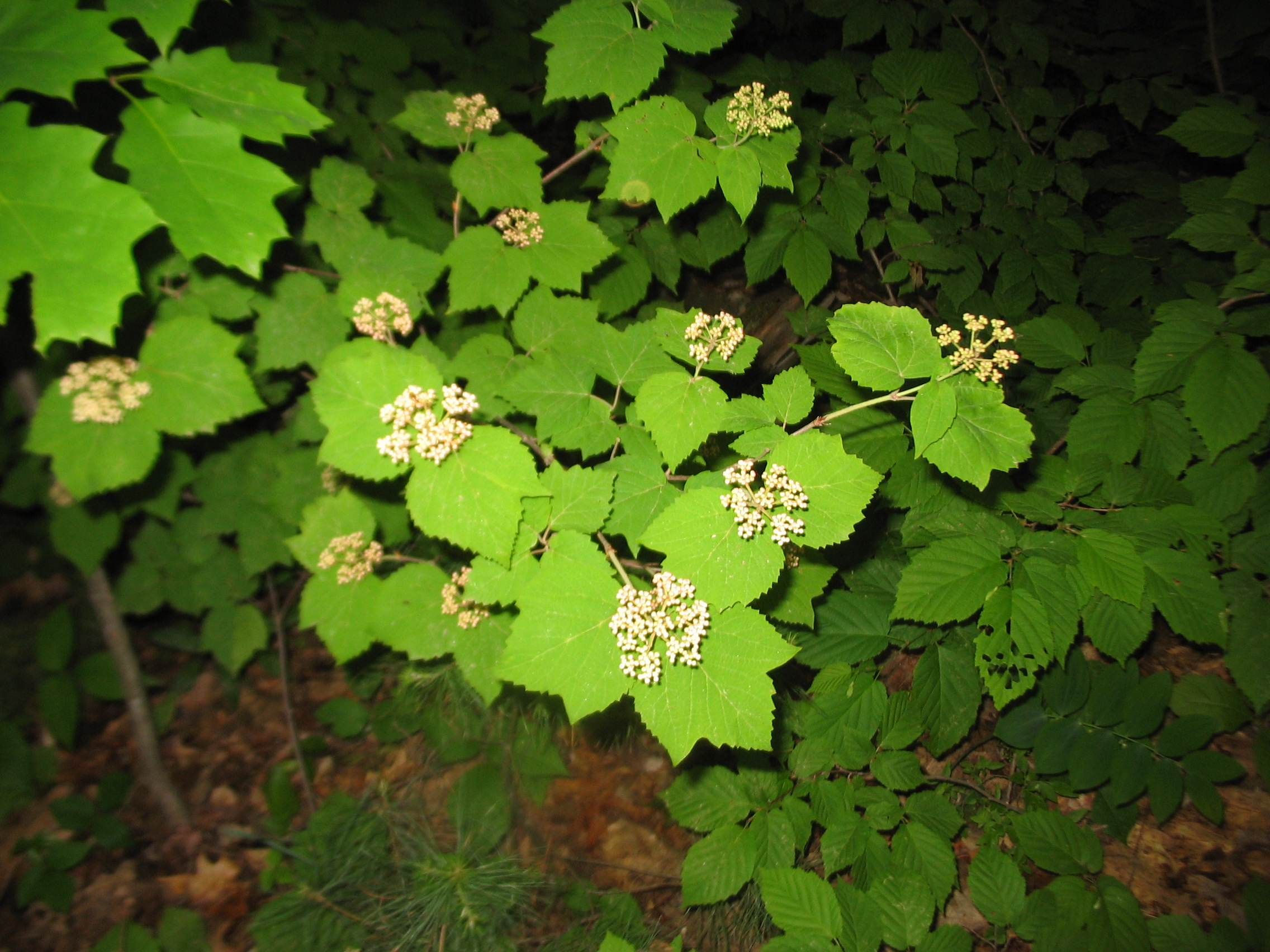

Conservation status
- Secure (NatureServe)

Scientific classification
- Kingdom: Plantae
- Clade: Tracheophytes
- Clade: Angiosperms
- Clade: Eudicots
- Clade: Asterids
- Order: Dipsacales
- Family: Adoxaceae
- Genus: Viburnum
- Species: V. acerifolium

Binomial name
- Viburnum acerifolium L.
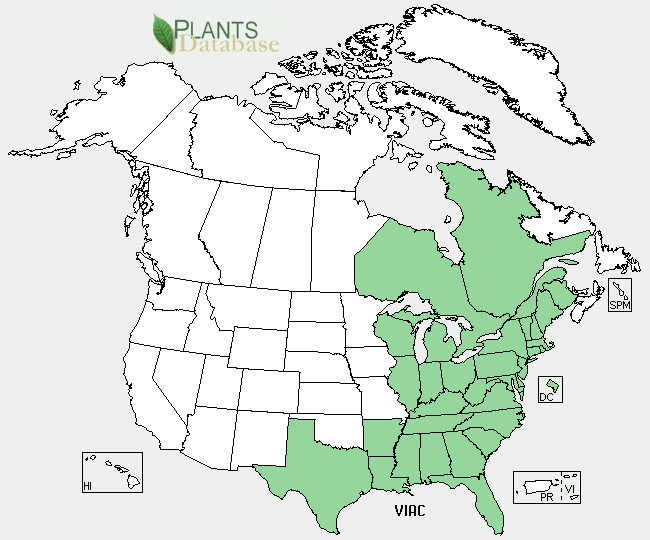
- Natural range in North America

= Viburnum acerifolium =

Species of flowering plant

Viburnum acerifolium, the mapleleaf viburnum, maple-leaved arrowwood or dockmackie, is a species of Viburnum native to eastern North America.

== Description ==
It is a shrub growing to 1–2 metres (3 1/2–6 1/2 ft) tall. The leaves are in opposite pairs, 5–10 centimetres (2–4 in) long and broad, three- to five-lobed, the lobes with a serrated margin, and the leaf surface has a fuzzy texture. This species exhibits a diverse range of autumn colors, from pale yellow to bright yellow, orange, or pink, rose, or red-purple, depending on light exposure and weather conditions. The flowers are white with five small petals, produced in terminal cymes 4–8 cm (1 1/2–3 in) in diameter. The fruit is a small red to purple-black drupe 4–8 millimetres (1/8–3/8 in) long.

The shrub often suckers and can form a colony in time.

== Distribution and habitat ==
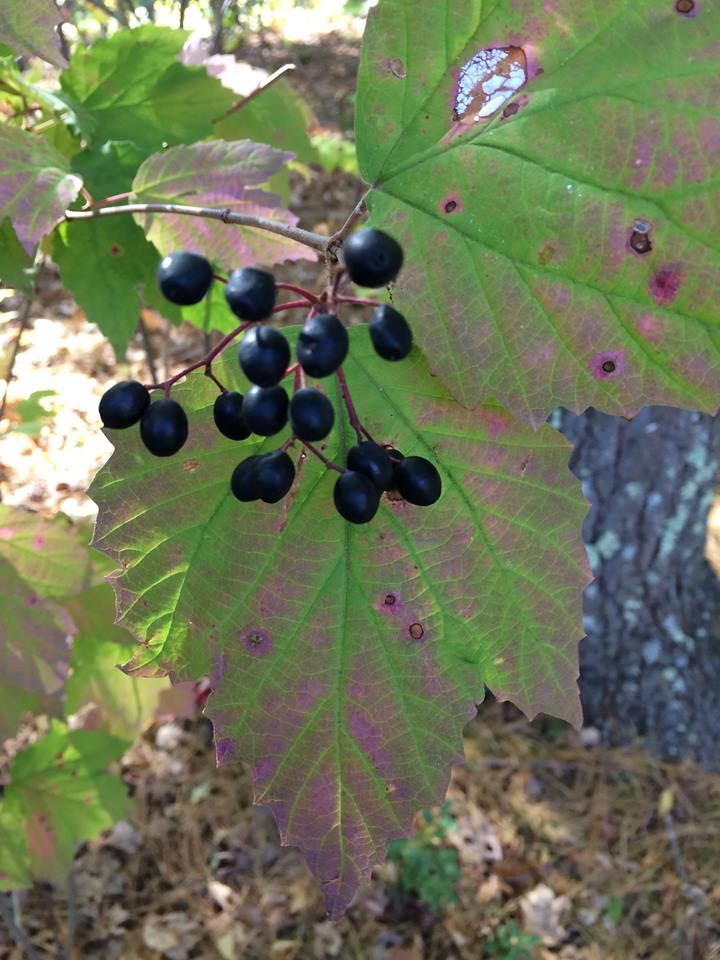
Autumn foliage and drupes, Massachusetts

Viburnum acerifolium is native to eastern North America, from southwestern Quebec and Ontario south to northern Florida and eastern Texas. It is found in the US states of Connecticut, Maine, Massachusetts, New Hampshire, Rhode Island, New York, Vermont, Illinois, Wisconsin, and Arkansas.

It is adapted for USDA hardiness zones of 4 to 8. It grows in and around upland forest, able to do well in full shade and dry soils. It grows mostly in acidic soil of pH 5.0 to 6.5, but can tolerate up to 7.5.

Landscape architects and designers have often recommended it for shady, dry locations for several decades, but it is only sold at a few large, diverse nurseries or specialty and native plant nurseries, and is not generally well known in the trade or among homeowners. Its native habitats include thickets, mixed woods, bluffs, and ravines.

== Ecology ==
The species' flowers are known for production of nectar and pollen which are then carried by the bee species from Andrenidae and Halictidae families as well as flies from the Empididae and Syrphidae families. The flowers also attract beetles, wasps and various butterflies (including skippers).

The fruit attracts butterflies and birds. Viburnum acerifolium is a larval host to the Celastrina ladon butterfly.

The berries are eaten by various mammals including skunks, rabbits, deer, the eastern chipmunk, white-footed mouse and deer mice. V. acerifolium also attracts various aphids, such as Viburnum leaf beetle, the wood-boring larvae of Oberea deficiens and Oberea tripunctata.

The scientific and common names refer to the superficial similarity of the leaves to those of some maples (Acer); the plant is occasionally mistaken for young maples, but is readily distinguished by the flowers and fruit; the viburnum produces small, purple berries, while maples produce dry, winged seeds.

== Uses ==
The mapleleaf viburnum was used in ethnobotany as a medicinal plant by Native Americans.

The Cherokee used the plant to make compound infusions. The infusions were used as an anticonvulsant and febrifuge as well as a treatment for sore tongue and smallpox. The Chippewa used infusions and decotions from the bark as an emetic and treatment for stomach cramps. The Iroquois used infusions made of several parts of the plant to treat excessive menses and urethral stricture. The Menominee used infusions made of the inner bark to treat cramps and colic.

The black berries, available from late summer to autumn, can be made into jam.
