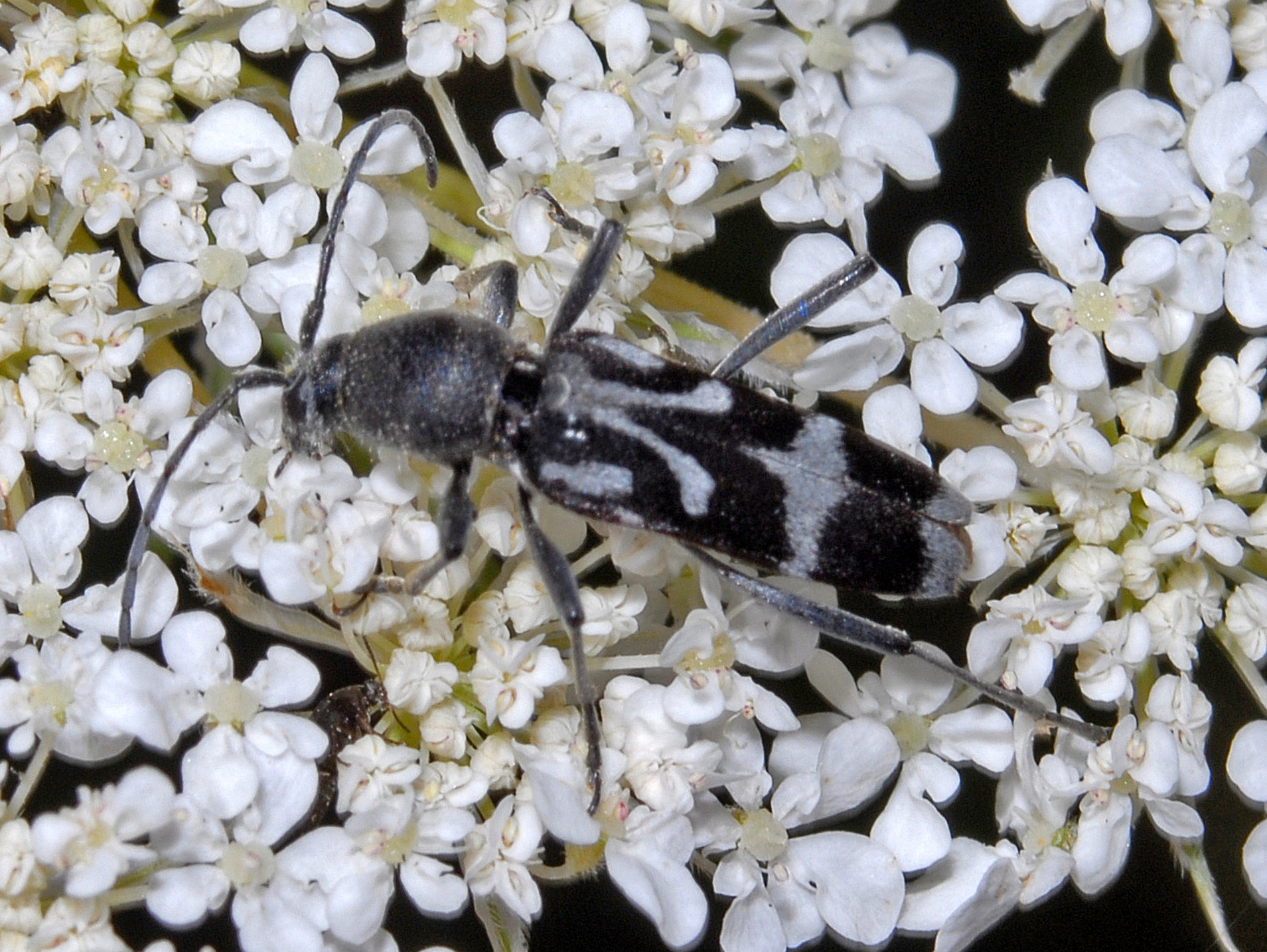
- Chlorophorus figuratus. Dorsal view

Scientific classification
- Kingdom: Animalia
- Phylum: Arthropoda
- Class: Insecta
- Order: Coleoptera
- Suborder: Polyphaga
- Infraorder: Cucujiformia
- Family: Cerambycidae
- Genus: Chlorophorus
- Species: C. figuratus

Binomial name
- Chlorophorus figuratus (Scopoli, 1763)

Synonyms
- Cerambyx figuratus Scopoli, 1763; Clytanthus figuratus (Scopoli, 1763); Cerambyx arietis Voet, 1778 (Unav.); Cerambyx (Callidium) leucozonias Gmelin, 1790; Clytus cordiger Aragona, 1830; Clytus plebejum Fabricius, 1781; Clytus plebejus Fabricius, 1801 (Missp.)

= Chlorophorus figuratus =

Species of insect

Chlorophorus figuratus is a species of round-necked longhorns belonging to the family Cerambycidae, subfamily Cerambycinae.

== Etymology ==
The genus name Chlorophorus derives from the Greek word chlorós meaning "green" and phorós meaning "wearing", while the specific name figuratus means "decorated with figures".

== Distribution ==
This widespread beetle is present in most of Europe (Albania, Austria, Belarus, Bosnia and Herzegovina, Bulgaria, Croatia, Czech Republic, France, Germany, Greece, Hungary, Italy, Montenegro, North Macedonia, Poland, Portugal, Romania, Russia, Serbia, Slovakia, Slovenia, Spain, Switzerland), and in the eastern Palearctic realm (Kazakhstan, Turkey, Armenia, Georgia, Iran).

== Habitat ==
These beetles mainly inhabit meadows and sunny forest edges.

== Description ==
Chlorophorus figuratus can reach a length of 8–13 millimetres (0.31–0.51 in). The body is elongated and cylindrical. The pronotum is about as wide as the elytra. The elytra are cut off at the end. Head, pronotum and elytra are black or brownish and the elytrae show various hairy gray stripes. This species is rather similar to Chlorophorus sartor, but in C. sartor the gray humeral stripe is missing.

== Biology ==
Adults can be encountered from May through Augusty., completing their life cycle in two year. Larvae are polyphagous in deciduous trees. They mainly feed on hazel (Corylus avellana), sweet chestnut (Castanea sativa), wild plum (Prunus domestica), blackthorn (Prunus spinosa) and spindle (Euonymus europaeus). The adults can be easily encountered on Apiaceae species.
