= Bamboo borer =

Bamboo borer may refer to:

- Chlorophorus annularis, a longhorn beetle native to Asia
- Dinoderus minutus, a woodboring beetle native to Asia
- Omphisa fuscidentalis, a Southeast Asian moth, the larvae of which feed off bamboo and which are considered a delicacy by the local population
