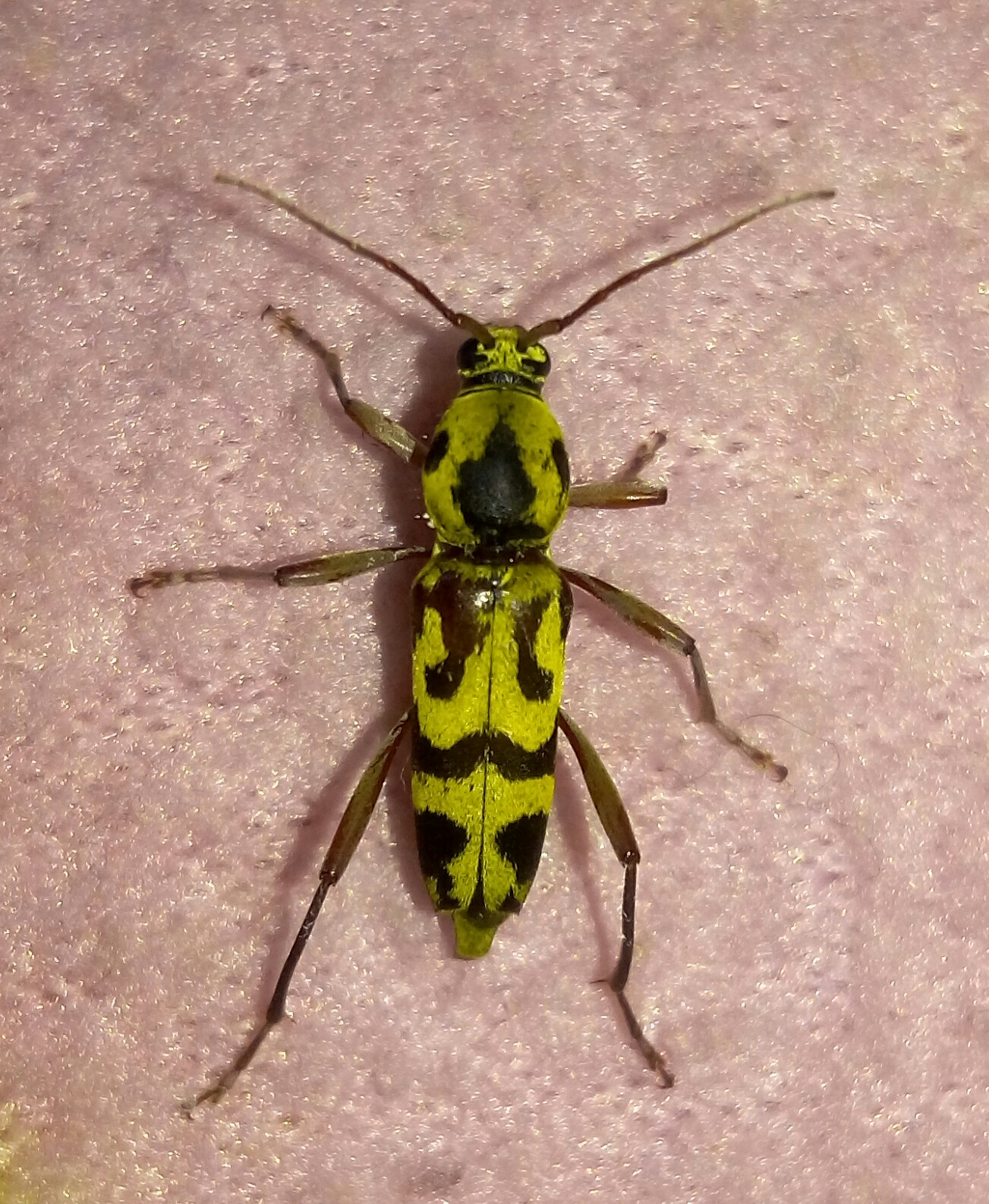

Scientific classification
- Domain: Eukaryota
- Kingdom: Animalia
- Phylum: Arthropoda
- Class: Insecta
- Order: Coleoptera
- Suborder: Polyphaga
- Infraorder: Cucujiformia
- Family: Cerambycidae
- Genus: Chlorophorus
- Species: C. agnatus

Binomial name
- Chlorophorus agnatus Chevrolat, 1863

Synonyms
- Caloclytus agnatus

= Chlorophorus agnatus =

Species of beetle

Chlorophorus agnatus is a species of longhorn beetle found in southern India. It was described in 1863 based on a specimen collected in the Nilgiris.

The beetle is 8-11 mm long and is covered in yellow pubescence abve with black markings. The antennae are half as long as the body in the female and longer in the male. The middle femora have a keel on each side while the hind pair have no such keeling.
