= Chlorophorus manillae =

Scientific classification
- Domain: Eukaryota
- Kingdom: Animalia
- Phylum: Arthropoda
- Class: Insecta
- Order: Coleoptera
- Suborder: Polyphaga
- Infraorder: Cucujiformia
- Family: Cerambycidae
- Genus: Chlorophorus
- Species: C. manillae

Binomial name
- Chlorophorus manillae Aurivillius, 1911

Species of beetle

Chlorophorus manillae is a species of beetle in the family Cerambycidae. It was described by Per Olof Christopher Aurivillius in 1911.
