= Chlorophorus boninensis =

Scientific classification
- Domain: Eukaryota
- Kingdom: Animalia
- Phylum: Arthropoda
- Class: Insecta
- Order: Coleoptera
- Suborder: Polyphaga
- Infraorder: Cucujiformia
- Family: Cerambycidae
- Genus: Chlorophorus
- Species: C. boninensis

Binomial name
- Chlorophorus boninensis Kano, 1933

Species of beetle

Chlorophorus boninensis is a species of beetle in the family Cerambycidae. It was described by Kano in 1933.
