= Chlorophorus gratiosus =

Scientific classification
- Domain: Eukaryota
- Kingdom: Animalia
- Phylum: Arthropoda
- Class: Insecta
- Order: Coleoptera
- Suborder: Polyphaga
- Infraorder: Cucujiformia
- Family: Cerambycidae
- Genus: Chlorophorus
- Species: C. gratiosus

Binomial name
- Chlorophorus gratiosus (Marseul, 1868)

Species of beetle

Chlorophorus gratiosus is a species of beetle in the family Cerambycidae. It was described by Marseul in 1868.
