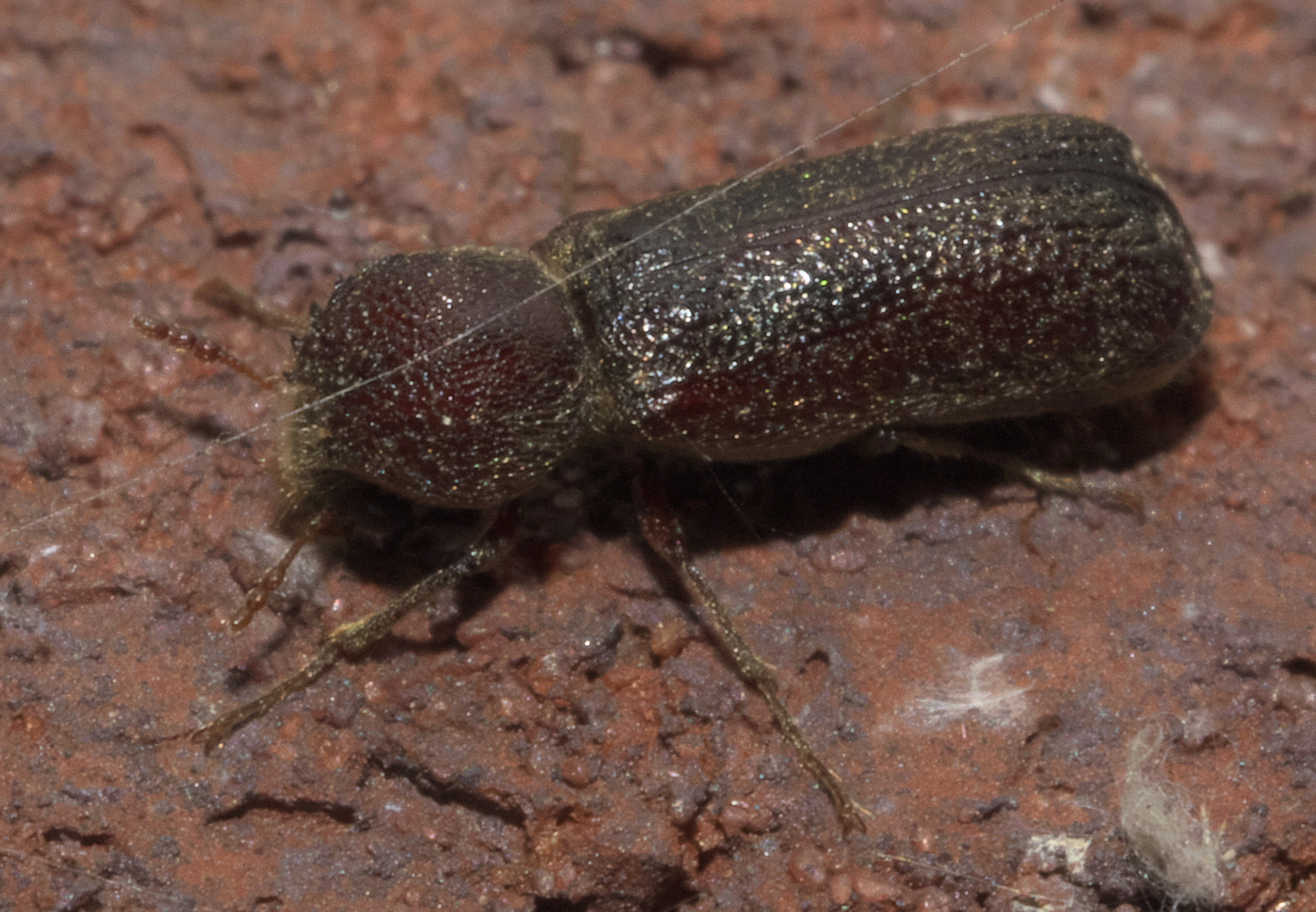

Scientific classification
- Kingdom: Animalia
- Phylum: Arthropoda
- Class: Insecta
- Order: Coleoptera
- Suborder: Polyphaga
- Family: Bostrichidae
- Tribe: Bostrichini
- Genus: Amphicerus; LeConte, 1861

Synonyms
- Caenophrada Waterhouse, 1888

= Amphicerus =

Genus of beetles

Amphicerus is a genus of horned powder-post beetles in the family Bostrichidae. There are about 14 described species in Amphicerus.

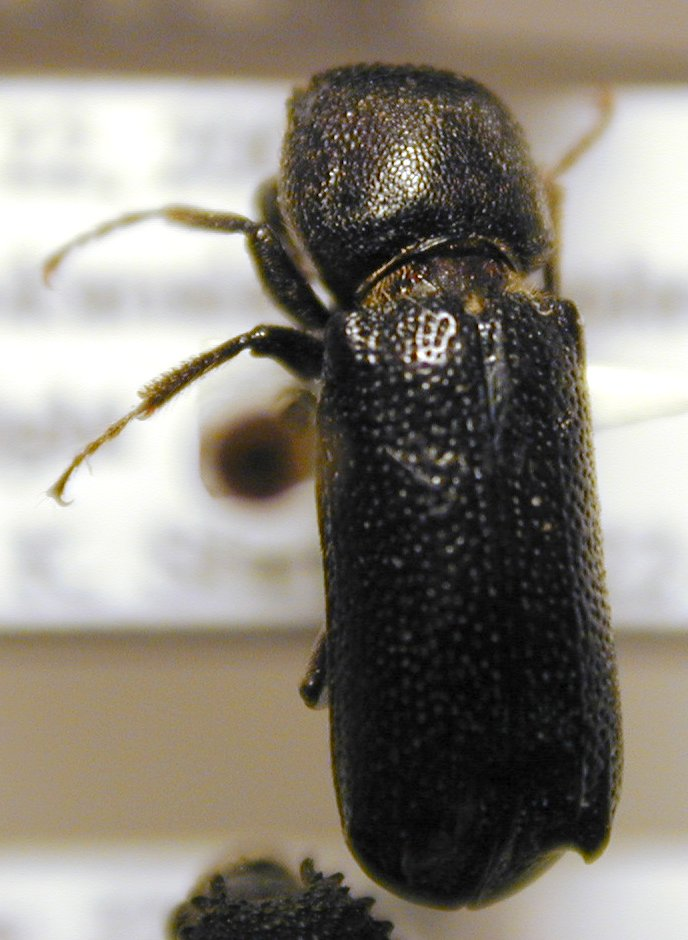
Amphicerus cornutus

== Species ==
These 14 species belong to the genus Amphicerus:

- Amphicerus anobioides (Waterhouse, 1888)^{i c g}
- Amphicerus bicaudatus (Say, 1824)^{i b} (apple twig borer)
- Amphicerus bimaculatus (Olivier, 1790)^{i c g b} (grape cane borer beetle)
- Amphicerus caenophradoides (Lesne, 1895)^{i c g}
- Amphicerus clunalis Lesne, 1939^{i c g}
- Amphicerus cornutus (Pallas, 1772)^{i c g b} (powderpost bostrichid)
- Amphicerus galapaganus (Lesne, 1910)^{i c g}
- Amphicerus hamatus (Fabricius, 1787)^{c g}
- Amphicerus lignator (Lesne, 1899)^{i c g}
- Amphicerus malayanus (Lesne, 1898)^{i c g}
- Amphicerus securimentum Lesne, 1939^{i c g}
- Amphicerus simplex (Horn, 1885)^{i c g b}
- Amphicerus teres Horn, 1878^{i c g b}
- Amphicerus tubularis (Gorham, 1883)^{i c g}

Data sources: i = ITIS, c = Catalogue of Life, g = GBIF, b = Bugguide.net
