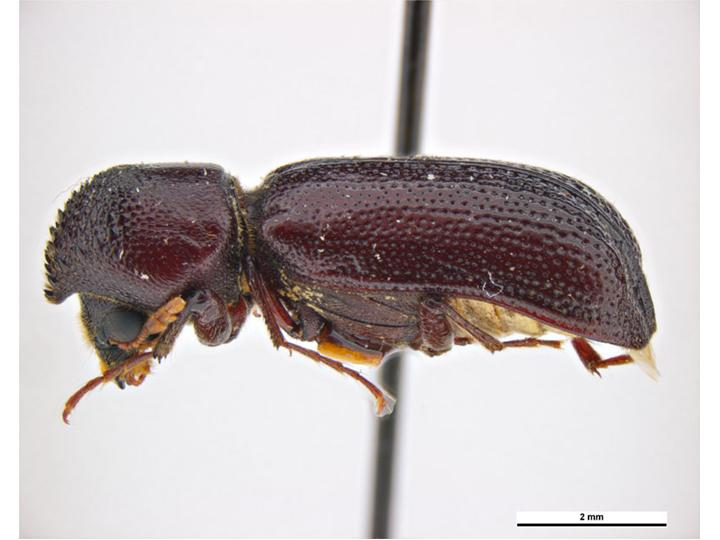

Scientific classification
- Domain: Eukaryota
- Kingdom: Animalia
- Phylum: Arthropoda
- Class: Insecta
- Order: Coleoptera
- Suborder: Polyphaga
- Family: Bostrichidae
- Tribe: Bostrichini
- Genus: Amphicerus
- Species: A. simplex

Binomial name
- Amphicerus simplex (Horn, 1885)

= Amphicerus simplex =

Species of beetle

Amphicerus simplex is a species of horned powder-post beetle in the family Bostrichidae. It is found in North America.
