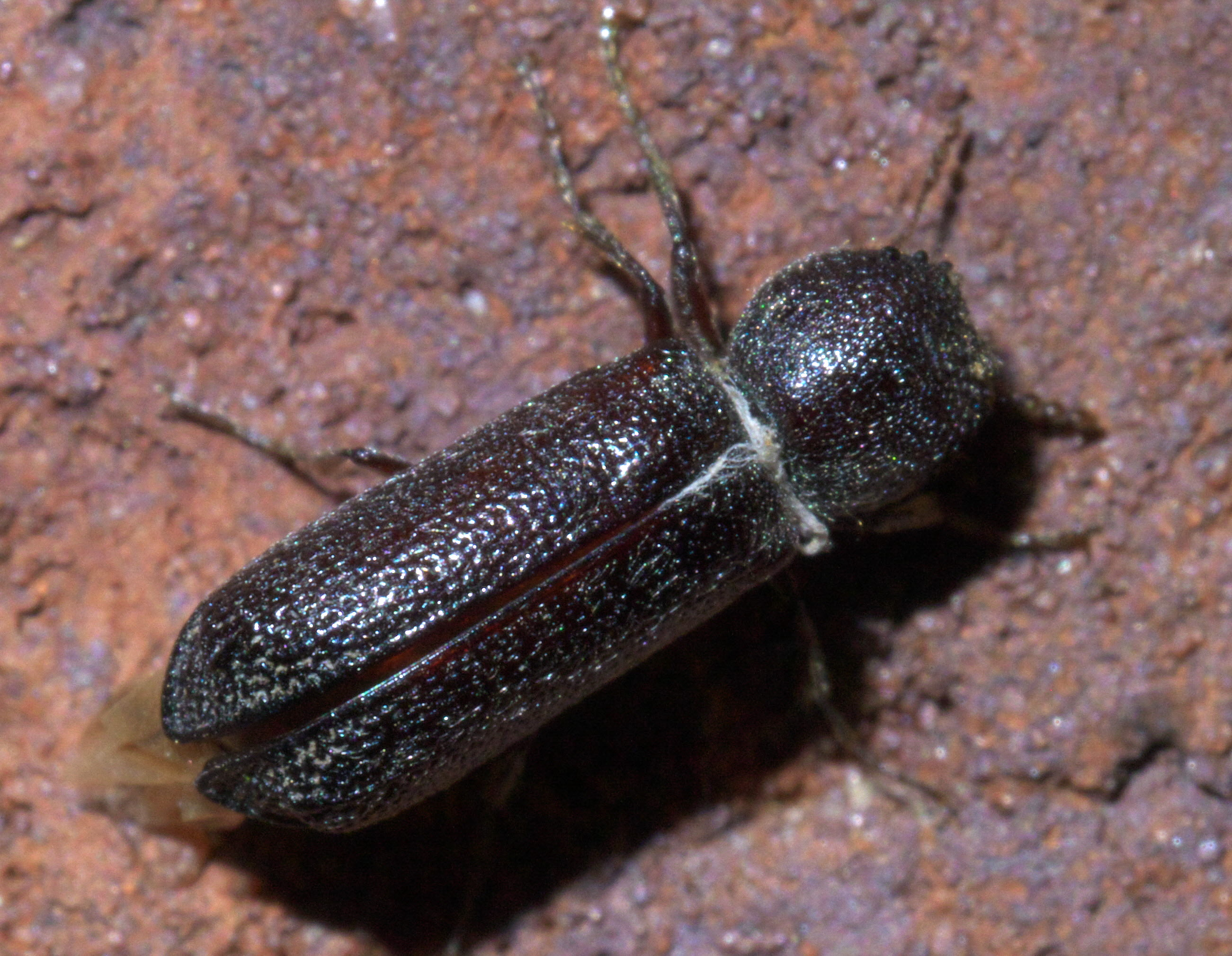

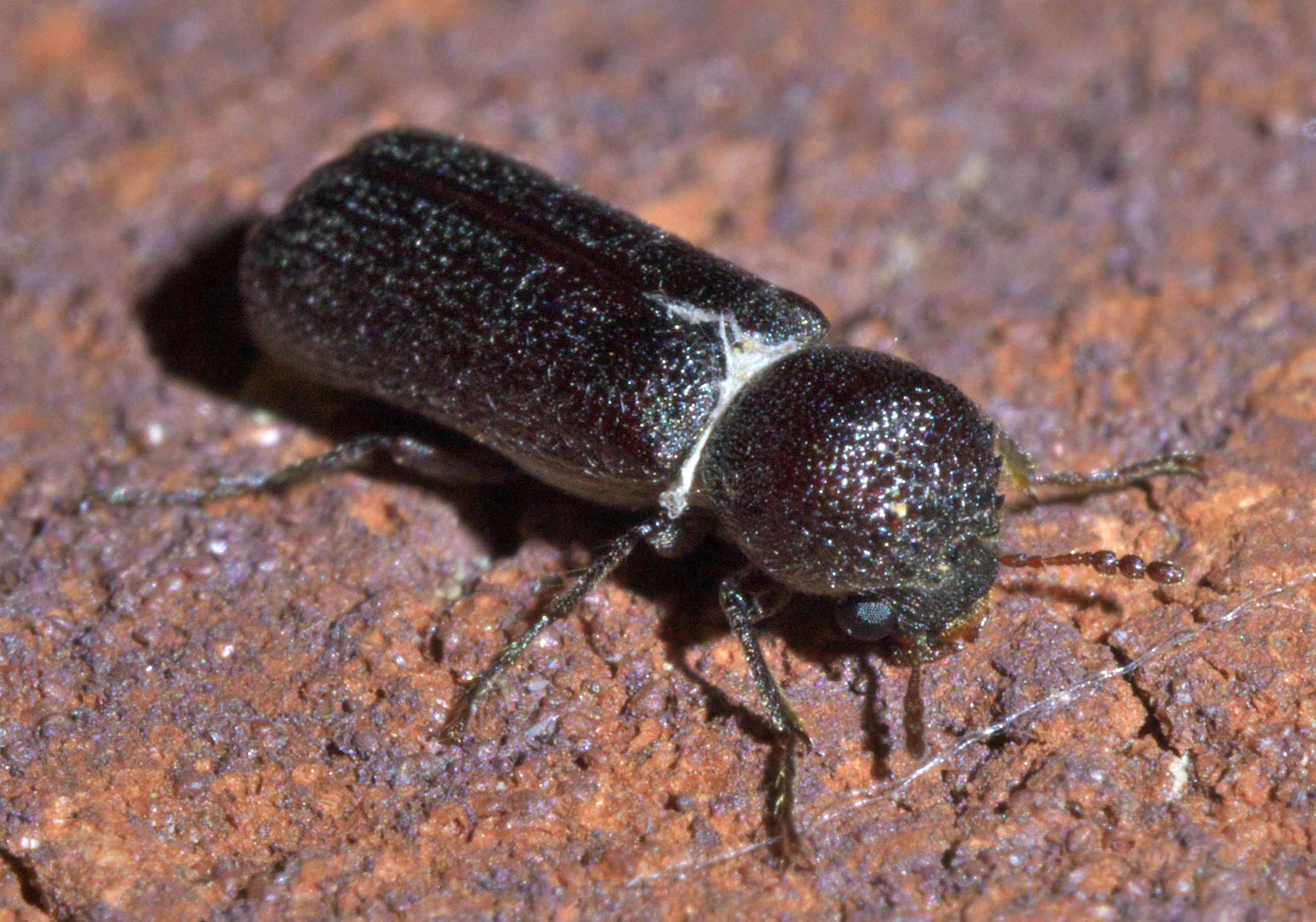

Scientific classification
- Domain: Eukaryota
- Kingdom: Animalia
- Phylum: Arthropoda
- Class: Insecta
- Order: Coleoptera
- Suborder: Polyphaga
- Family: Bostrichidae
- Genus: Amphicerus
- Species: A. bicaudatus

Binomial name
- Amphicerus bicaudatus (Say, 1824)

Synonyms
- Apate bicaudatus Say, 1824

= Amphicerus bicaudatus =

Apple Twig/Grape Cane Borer, beetle

Amphicerus bicaudatus, known generally as the apple twig borer or grape cane borer, is a species of horned powder-post beetle in the family Bostrichidae. It is a pest of cultivated orchard trees as well as grapes and other tree species.

== Description ==
Adults are long and cylindrical, about 6 to 13 millimeters long. Color can range from reddish brown to black. Larvae are white with a brown head and mandibles, about 10 millimeters long.

== Population dynamics ==
Allen et al., 1991 finds some periodicity and some chaos in its population dynamics while Allen et al., 1993 finds only periodicity and quasiperiodicity. Both examine the interaction of beetle, insecticide, cane removal, and the grapevine host. The 1991 model shows some chaotic solutions while 1993 never does.
