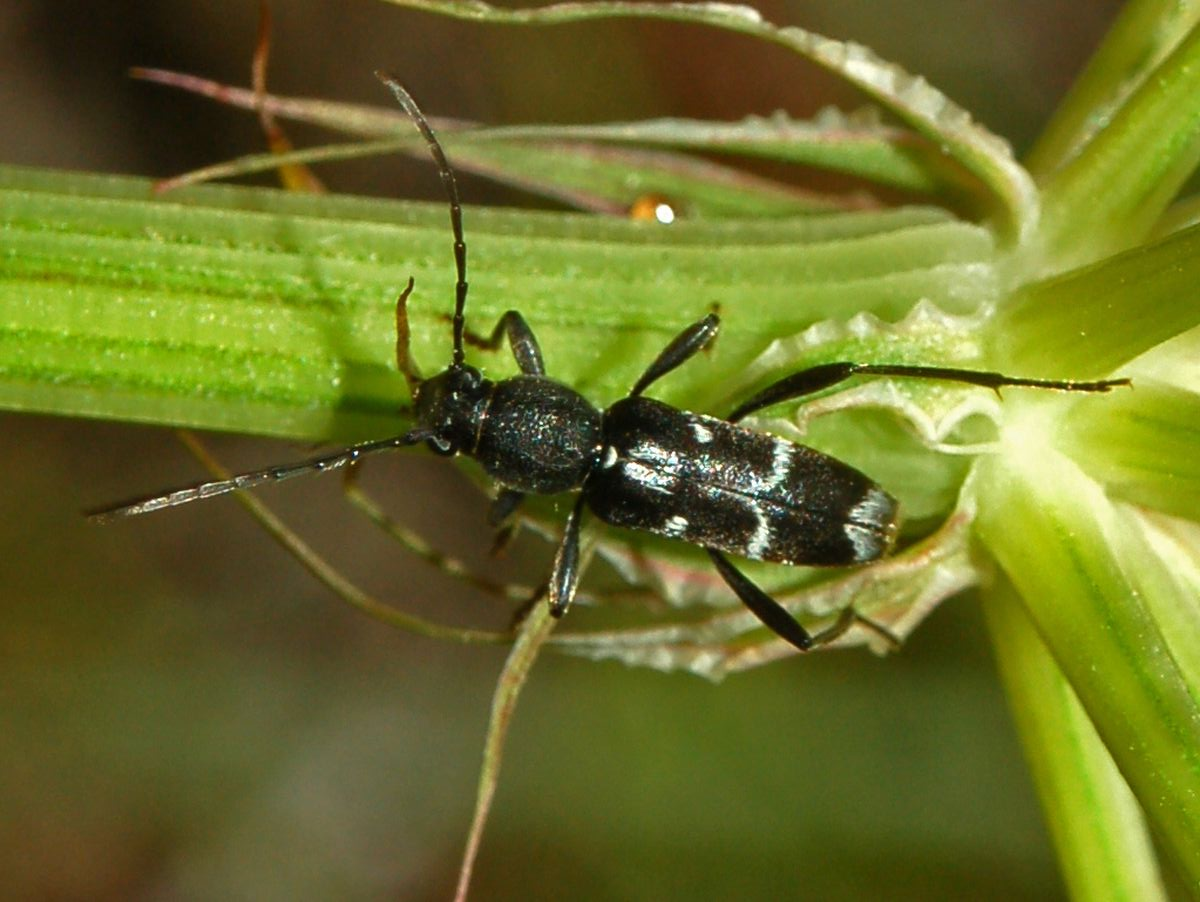
- Chlorophorus sartor. Dorsal view

Scientific classification
- Domain: Eukaryota
- Kingdom: Animalia
- Phylum: Arthropoda
- Class: Insecta
- Order: Coleoptera
- Suborder: Polyphaga
- Infraorder: Cucujiformia
- Family: Cerambycidae
- Genus: Chlorophorus
- Species: C. sartor

Binomial name
- Chlorophorus sartor (O.F. Müller, 1766)

Synonyms
- List: Cerambyx sartor (O.F. Müller, 1766); Chlorophorus massiliensis (Linnaeus); Leptura achilleae (Brahm, 1790); Leptura massiliensis (Linnaeus, 1767); Leptura sartor (Müller, Plavilstshikov, 1940)

= Chlorophorus sartor =

Species of beetle

Chlorophorus sartor is a species of beetle of the family Cerambycidae, subfamily Cerambycinae.

== Etymology ==
The genus name Chlorophorus derives from the Greek word chlorós meaning green and phorós meaning wearing, while the species name sartor means tailor.

== Distribution ==
This widespread and common beetle is present in most of Europe (Albania, Austria, Belarus, Bosnia and Herzegovina, Bulgaria, Croatia, Czech Republic, France, Germany, Greece, Hungary, Italy, Montenegro, North Macedonia, Poland, Portugal, Romania, Russia, Serbia, Slovakia, Slovenia, Spain, and Switzerland), in the eastern Palearctic realm, and in the Near East.

== Habitat ==
These beetles inhabit meadows and forest edges. In spring and summer they can be found on flowers of many plant species.

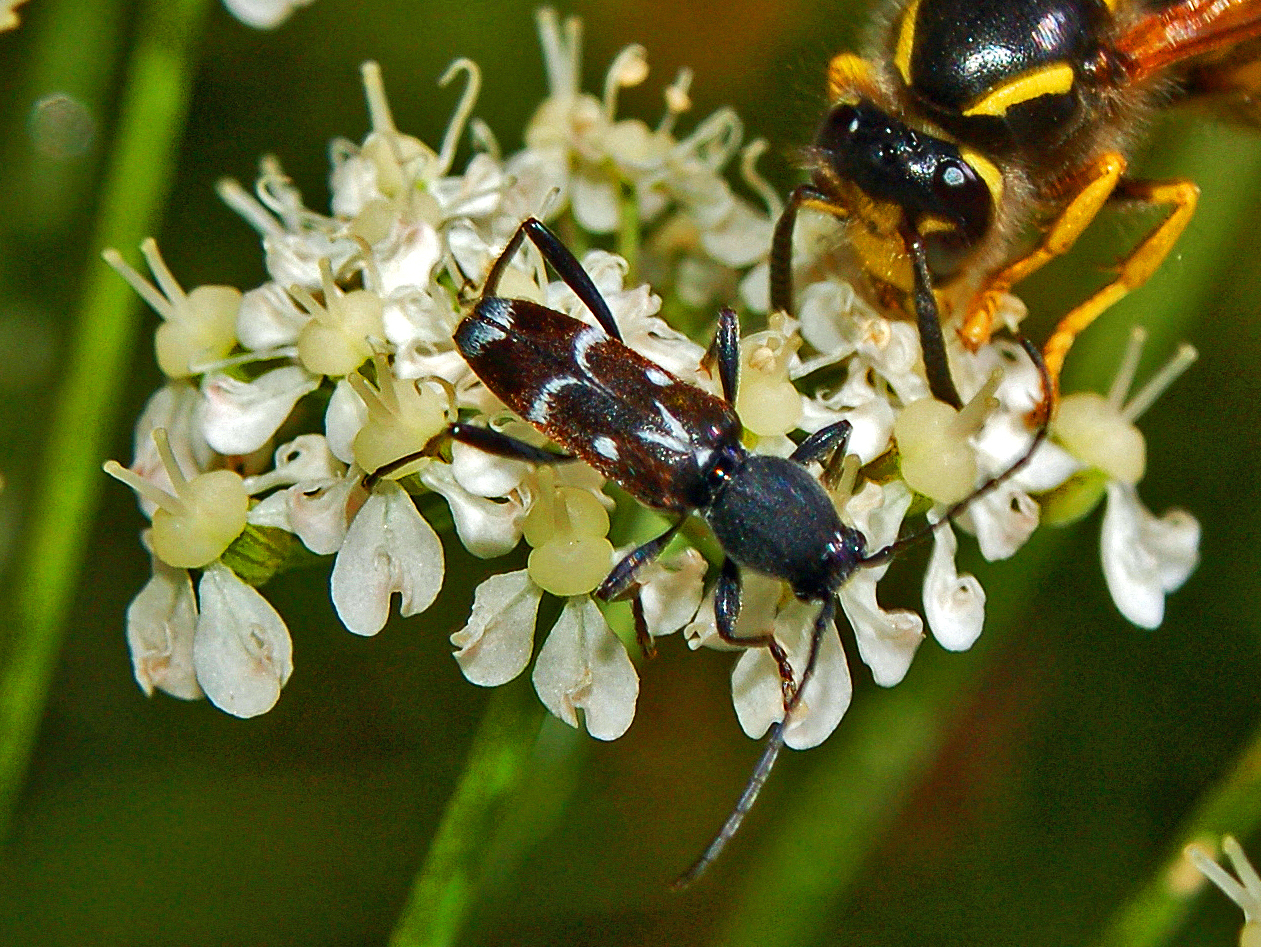
C. sartor – male

== Description ==
Chlorophorus sartor can reach a length of 6–10 millimetres (0.24–0.39 in). Head, pronotum and elytra are black or brownish and the elytrae show three light stripes and dots.

This species is rather similar to Chlorophorus pelleteri.

== Biology ==
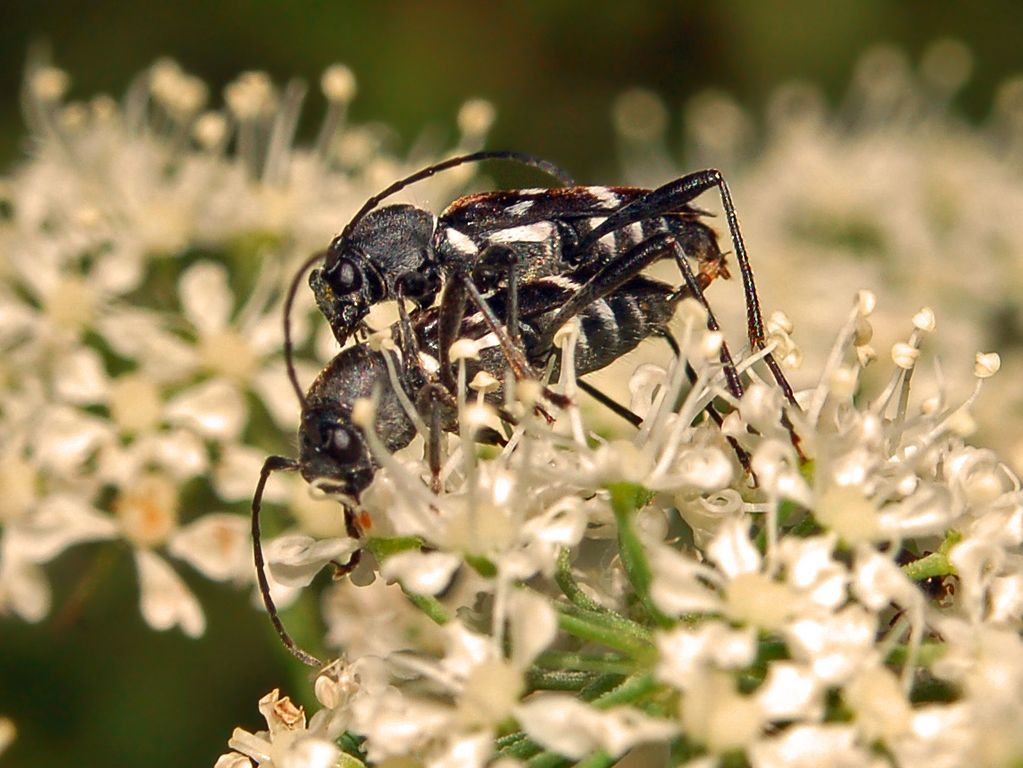
C. sartor – mating pair

Adults can be encountered from May through August, completing their life cycle in two year. The imagos fly the second year. They are polyphagous in deciduous trees.

Larvae mainly feed on Fagus sylvatica, Pistacia atlantica, Paliurus spina-christi, Ostrya carpinifolia, Celtis australis, Castanea sativa, Quercus pubescens, Ficus carica, Quercus ilex, but also on Ulmus and Crataegus species, Daucus carota, etc.. The adults can be easily encountered on Apiaceae species.
