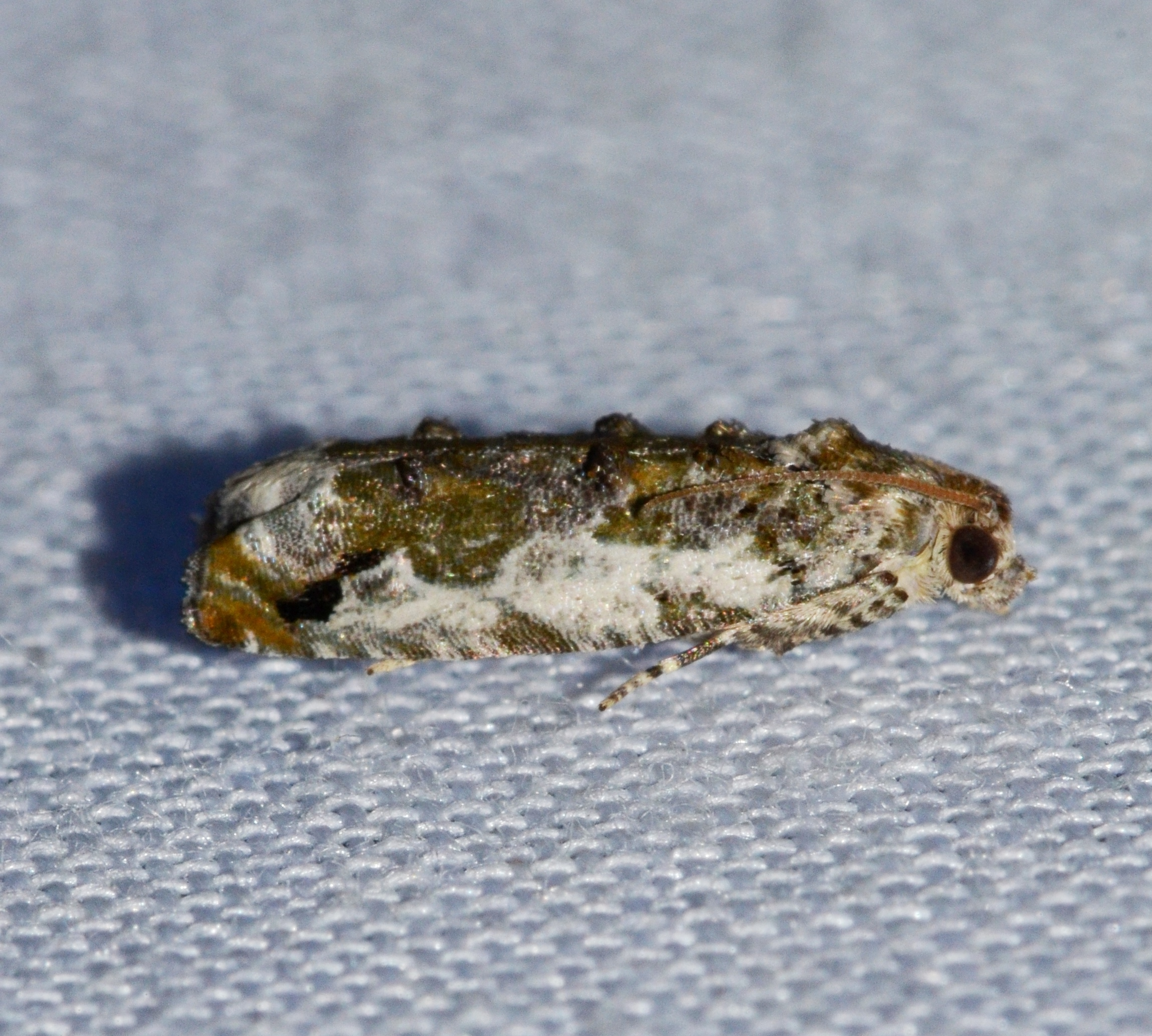

Scientific classification
- Domain: Eukaryota
- Kingdom: Animalia
- Phylum: Arthropoda
- Class: Insecta
- Order: Lepidoptera
- Family: Tortricidae
- Genus: Proteoteras
- Species: P. naracana

Binomial name
- Proteoteras naracana Kearfott, 1907

Synonyms
- Proteoteras praesinospila Meyrick, 1912

= Proteoteras naracana =

Species of moth

Proteoteras naracana is a moth of the family Tortricidae. It is found in North America, where it has been recorded from Alabama, Illinois, Indiana, Kentucky, Maryland, Massachusetts, Ohio, Pennsylvania, Tennessee, West Virginia and Wisconsin.

The wingspan is 15–17 mm. Adults are on wing from April to July.

The larvae feed on Acer species.
