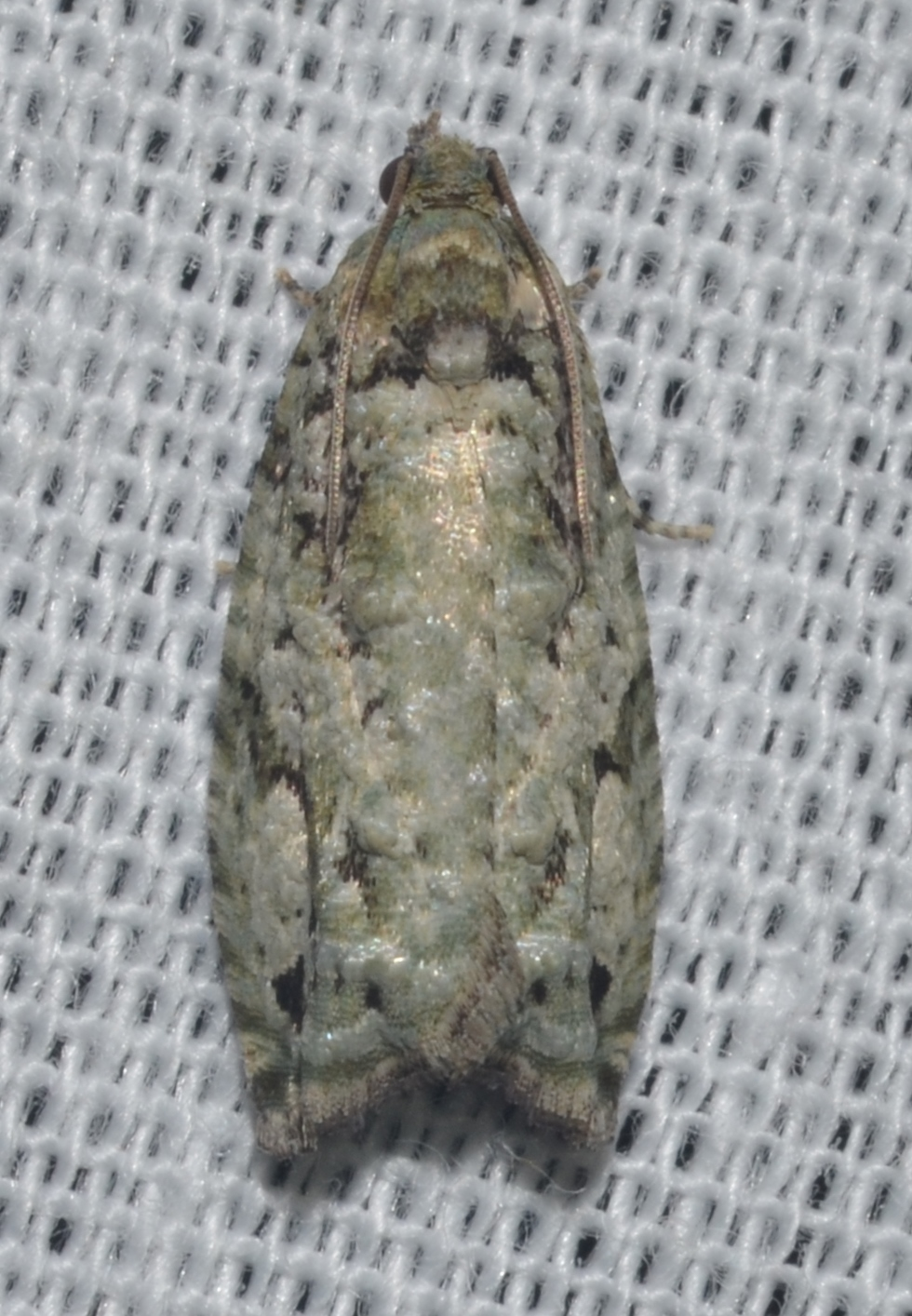

Scientific classification
- Domain: Eukaryota
- Kingdom: Animalia
- Phylum: Arthropoda
- Class: Insecta
- Order: Lepidoptera
- Family: Tortricidae
- Genus: Proteoteras
- Species: P. moffatiana

Binomial name
- Proteoteras moffatiana Fernald, 1905

= Proteoteras moffatiana =

Species of moth

Proteoteras moffatiana, known generally as the gray-flanked proteotera or maple shoot borer, is a species of tortricid moth in the family Tortricidae.

The MONA or Hodges number for Proteoteras moffatiana is 3235.

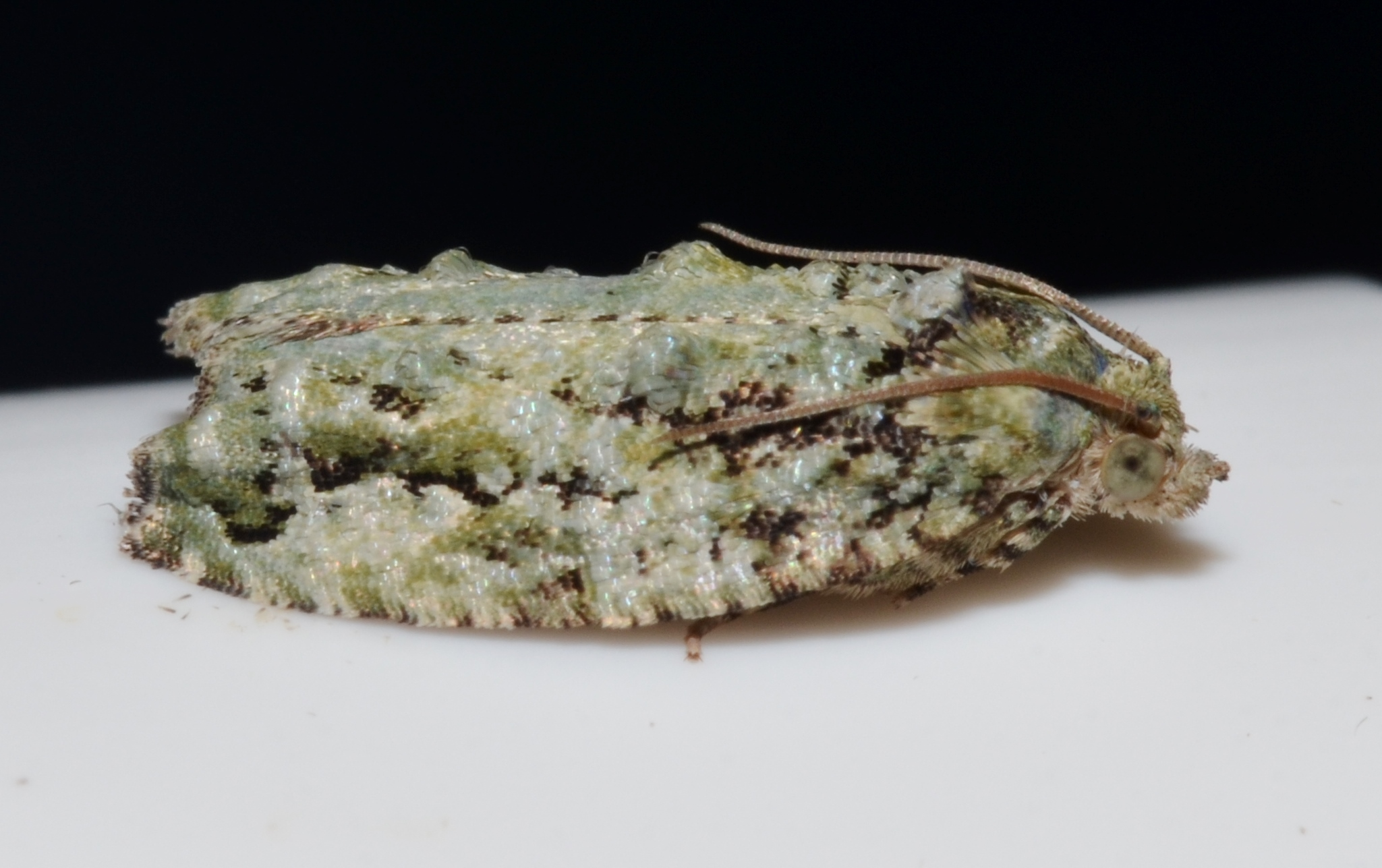
Gray-flanked proteoteras, Proteoteras moffatiana
