= Chlorophorus aritai =

Scientific classification
- Domain: Eukaryota
- Kingdom: Animalia
- Phylum: Arthropoda
- Class: Insecta
- Order: Coleoptera
- Suborder: Polyphaga
- Infraorder: Cucujiformia
- Family: Cerambycidae
- Genus: Chlorophorus
- Species: C. aritai

Binomial name
- Chlorophorus aritai (Ohbayashi, 1964)

Species of beetle

Chlorophorus aritai is a species of beetle in the family Cerambycidae. It was described by Ohbayashi in 1964.
