= Chlorophorus miwai =

Scientific classification
- Kingdom: Animalia
- Phylum: Arthropoda
- Class: Insecta
- Order: Coleoptera
- Suborder: Polyphaga
- Infraorder: Cucujiformia
- Family: Cerambycidae
- Genus: Chlorophorus
- Species: C. miwai

Binomial name
- Chlorophorus miwai Gressitt, 1936

Species of beetle

Chlorophorus miwai is a species of beetle in the family Cerambycidae. It was described by Gressitt in 1936.
