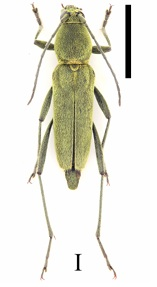

Scientific classification
- Kingdom: Animalia
- Phylum: Arthropoda
- Class: Insecta
- Order: Coleoptera
- Suborder: Polyphaga
- Infraorder: Cucujiformia
- Family: Cerambycidae
- Genus: Chlorophorus
- Species: C. eleodes

Binomial name
- Chlorophorus eleodes (Fairmaire, 1889)

Synonyms
- Clytus eleodes Fairmaire, 1889; Clytanthus insignifer Pic, 1902; Chlorophorus insignifer v. robustus Pic, 1920

= Chlorophorus eleodes =

Species of beetle

Chlorophorus eleodes is a species of beetle of the Cerambycidae family. This species is found in China (Sichuan, Hubei, Guizhou, Xizang, Shaanxi, Yunnan, Xinjiang, Jiangxi, Chongqing, Guangxi).
