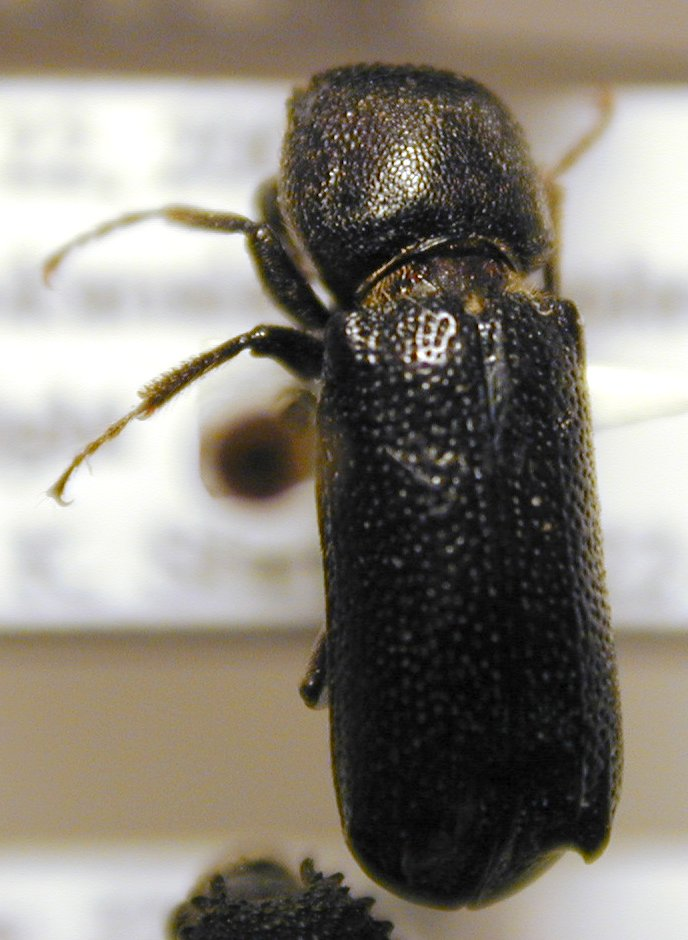

Scientific classification
- Domain: Eukaryota
- Kingdom: Animalia
- Phylum: Arthropoda
- Class: Insecta
- Order: Coleoptera
- Suborder: Polyphaga
- Family: Bostrichidae
- Genus: Amphicerus
- Species: A. cornutus

Binomial name
- Amphicerus cornutus (Pallas, 1772)

= Amphicerus cornutus =

Species of beetle

Amphicerus cornutus is a horned powderpost beetle species in the genus Amphicerus.
