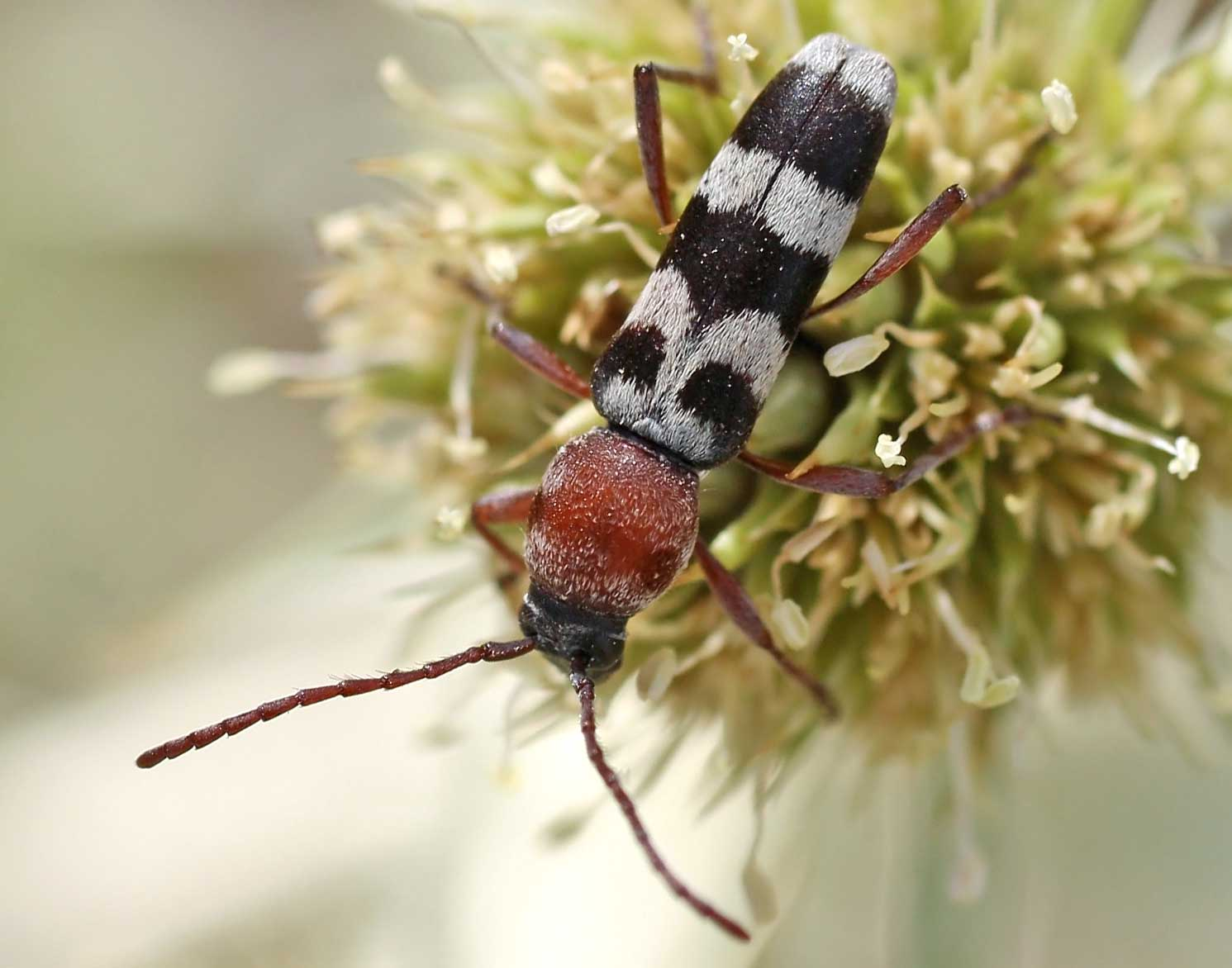

Scientific classification
- Kingdom: Animalia
- Phylum: Arthropoda
- Clade: Pancrustacea
- Class: Insecta
- Order: Coleoptera
- Suborder: Polyphaga
- Infraorder: Cucujiformia
- Family: Cerambycidae
- Genus: Chlorophorus
- Species: C. trifasciatus

Binomial name
- Chlorophorus trifasciatus (Fabricius, 1781)

= Chlorophorus trifasciatus =

Species of longhorn beetle

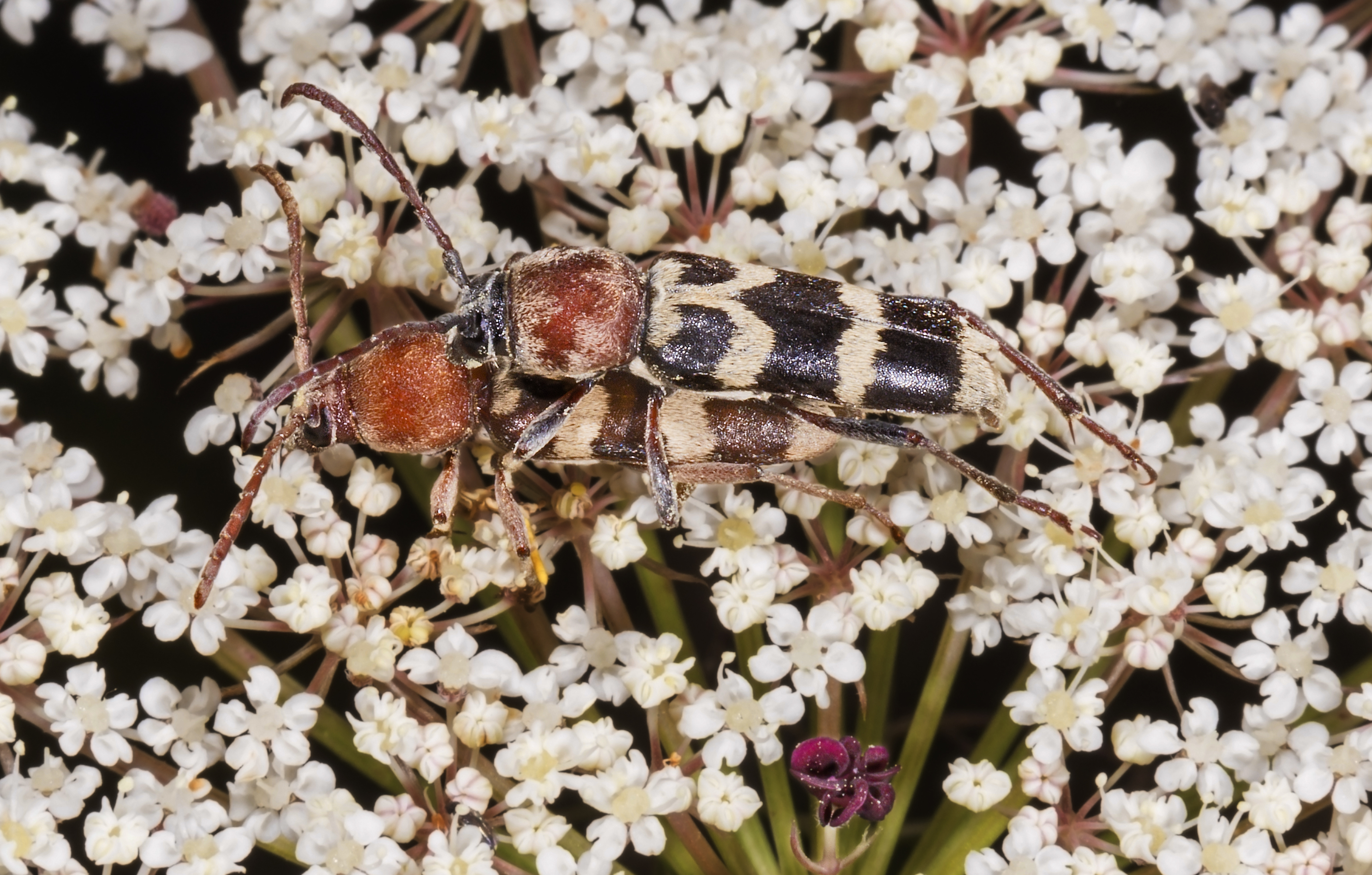
Mating

Chlorophorus trifasciatus is a species of longhorn beetle. It can be found on oak trees near the Mediterranean Basin.
