= Proteoteras willingana =

Scientific classification
- Domain: Eukaryota
- Kingdom: Animalia
- Phylum: Arthropoda
- Class: Insecta
- Order: Lepidoptera
- Family: Tortricidae
- Genus: Proteoteras
- Species: P. willingana

Binomial name
- Proteoteras willingana (Kearfott, 1904)

Synonyms
- Proteopteryx willingana Kearfott, 1904

Species of moth

Proteoteras willingana, the eastern boxelder twig borer moth, is a moth of the family Tortricidae. It is found in southern Canada and the eastern United States, west through the Great Plains.

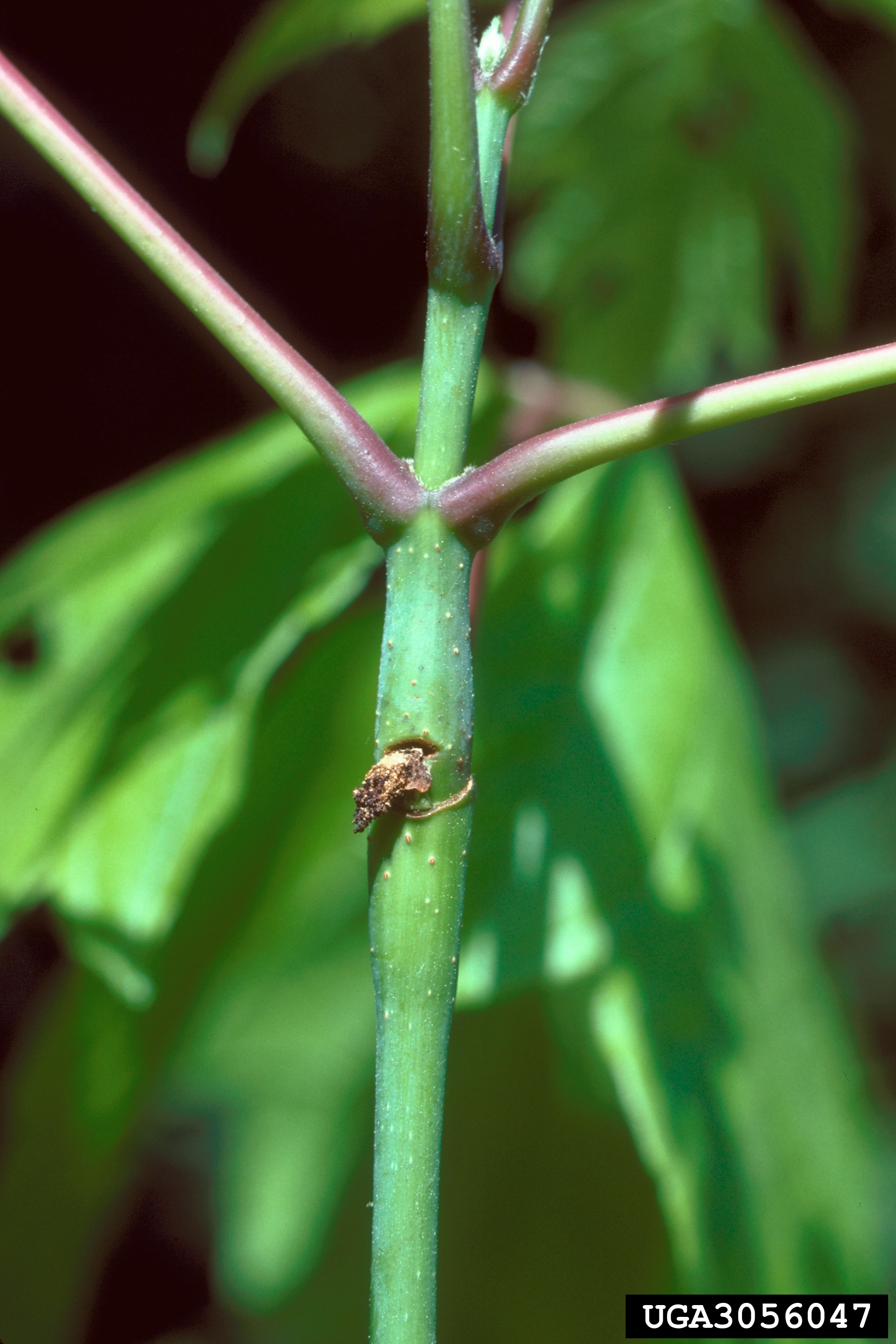
Damage

The wingspan is 15–25 mm.
