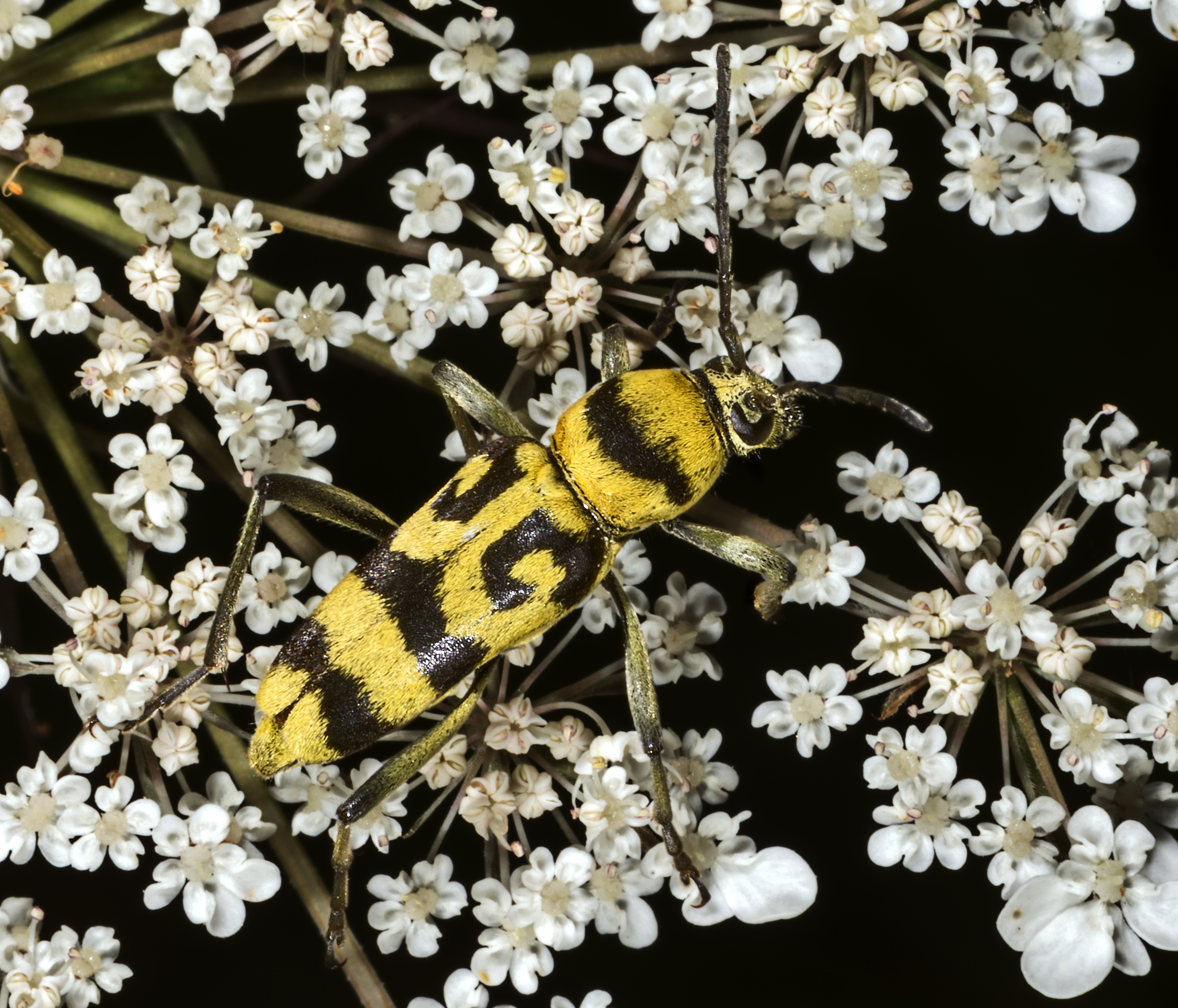

Scientific classification
- Domain: Eukaryota
- Kingdom: Animalia
- Phylum: Arthropoda
- Class: Insecta
- Order: Coleoptera
- Suborder: Polyphaga
- Infraorder: Cucujiformia
- Family: Cerambycidae
- Genus: Chlorophorus
- Species: C. varius

Binomial name
- Chlorophorus varius (O.F. Müller, 1766)

Synonyms
- Leptura varia O.F. Müller, 1766 (protonym); Chlorophorus verbasci Linné, 1767; Chlorophorus nigrofasciatus Goeze, 1777; Chlorophorus ornatus Herbst, 1784; Chlorophorus gammoides Geoffroy 1785; Chlorophorus duplex Scopoli, 1787; Chlorophorus strigosus Gmelin, 1790; Chlorophorus venustus Gmelin, 1790

= Chlorophorus varius =

Species of beetle

Chlorophorus varius, the grape wood borer, is a species of beetle in the family Cerambycidae.

== Taxonomy ==
It was described by O.F. Müller in 1766 under the original name of Leptura varia.

== Subspecies and varietas ==
Subspecies and varietas include:

- Chlorophorus varius damascenus Chevrolat, 1854
- Chlorophorus varius varius (O.F. Müller, 1766)
- Chlorophorus varius varius var. incarnus Plavilstshikov

== Distribution ==
This species is present in most of Europe (except the north) (Albania, Austria, Belarus, Bulgaria, Corsica, Croatia, Cyprus, Czech Republic, France, Germany, Greece, Hungary, Italy, Latvia, Malta, Montenegro, North Macedonia, Poland, Romania, Serbia, Slovakia, Slovenia, Spain, Sweden, Switzerland, Ukraine), Caucasus, Transcaucasia, Turkey, North Iran and in the Near East (Egypt, Israel, Jordan, Lebanon, Syria).

== Habitat ==
These beetles mainly inhabit sunny meadows and woodland edges, at an elevation of 60–800 metres (200–2,620 ft) above sea level.

== Description ==
Chlorophorus varius can reach a body length of 8–14 millimetres (0.31–0.55 in). The body of these beetles is elongated and rather variable in coloration and markings (hence the Latin species name varius). It is covered by a yellow-greenish pubescence, more rarely gray or whitish. The male has longer antennae (reaching mid-elytra) than the female. The pronotum is barred by a black band, sometimes limited to three black spots. The pronotum and elytra have the same width. Elytra are matt, with a C-shaped black marking and two other transversal wasp-like black bands. Legs and antennae are dark brown. Larvae reach a length of about 15 mm.

== Biology ==
Adults can be found from May to September. They feed on pollen and nectar of various flowers, especially of Apiaceae. The life cycle lasts 2 – 3 years. Larvae are saproxylic, mainly developing in the wood and dead branches of deciduous trees and shrubs (Vitis, Acer, Quercus, Populus, Malus, Crataegus, Juglans, etc.), sometimes of conifers. Pupation occurs in spring in the wood.

== Gallery ==
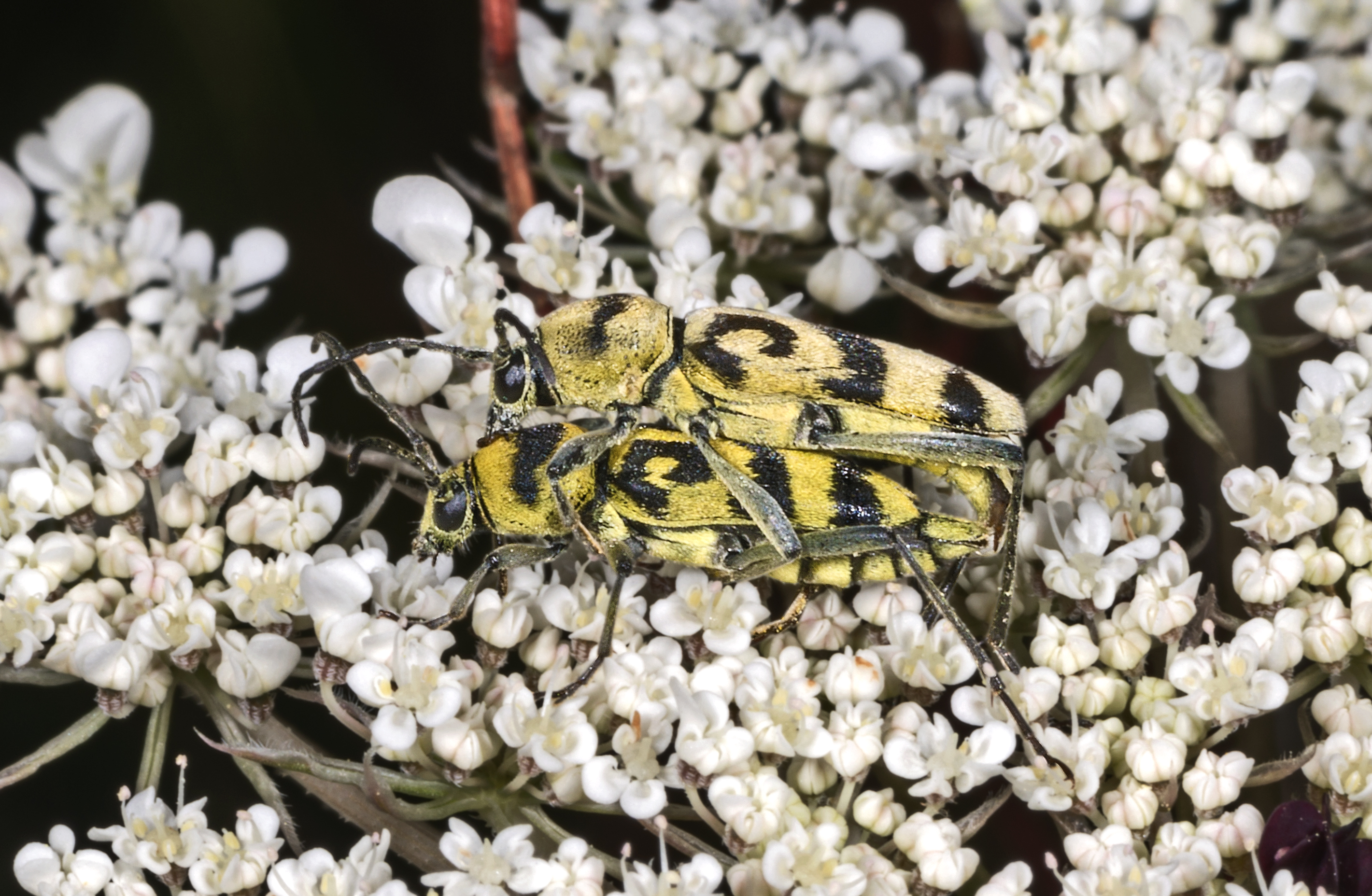
Chlorophorus varius. Mating

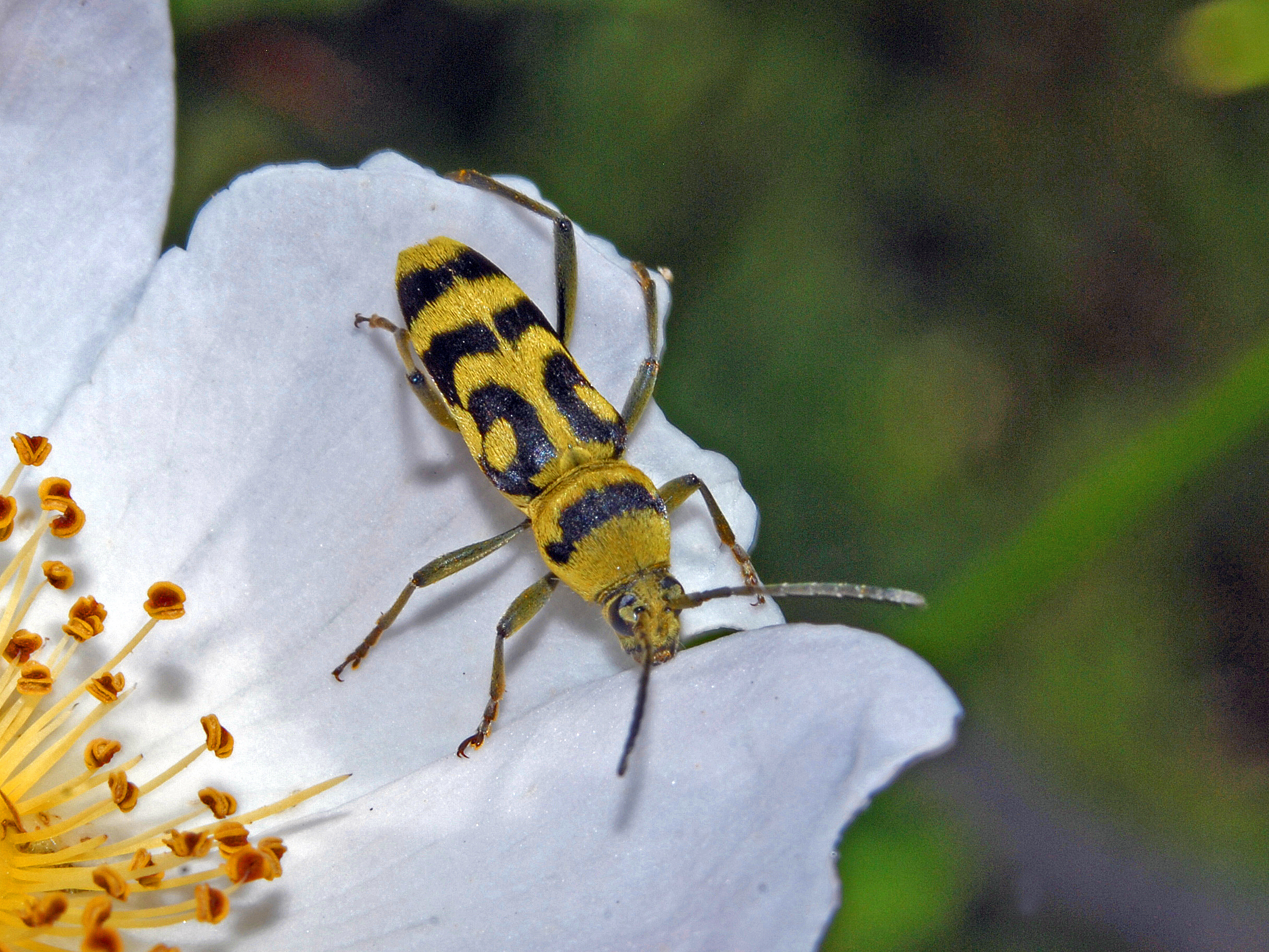
Chlorophorus varius varius. Female

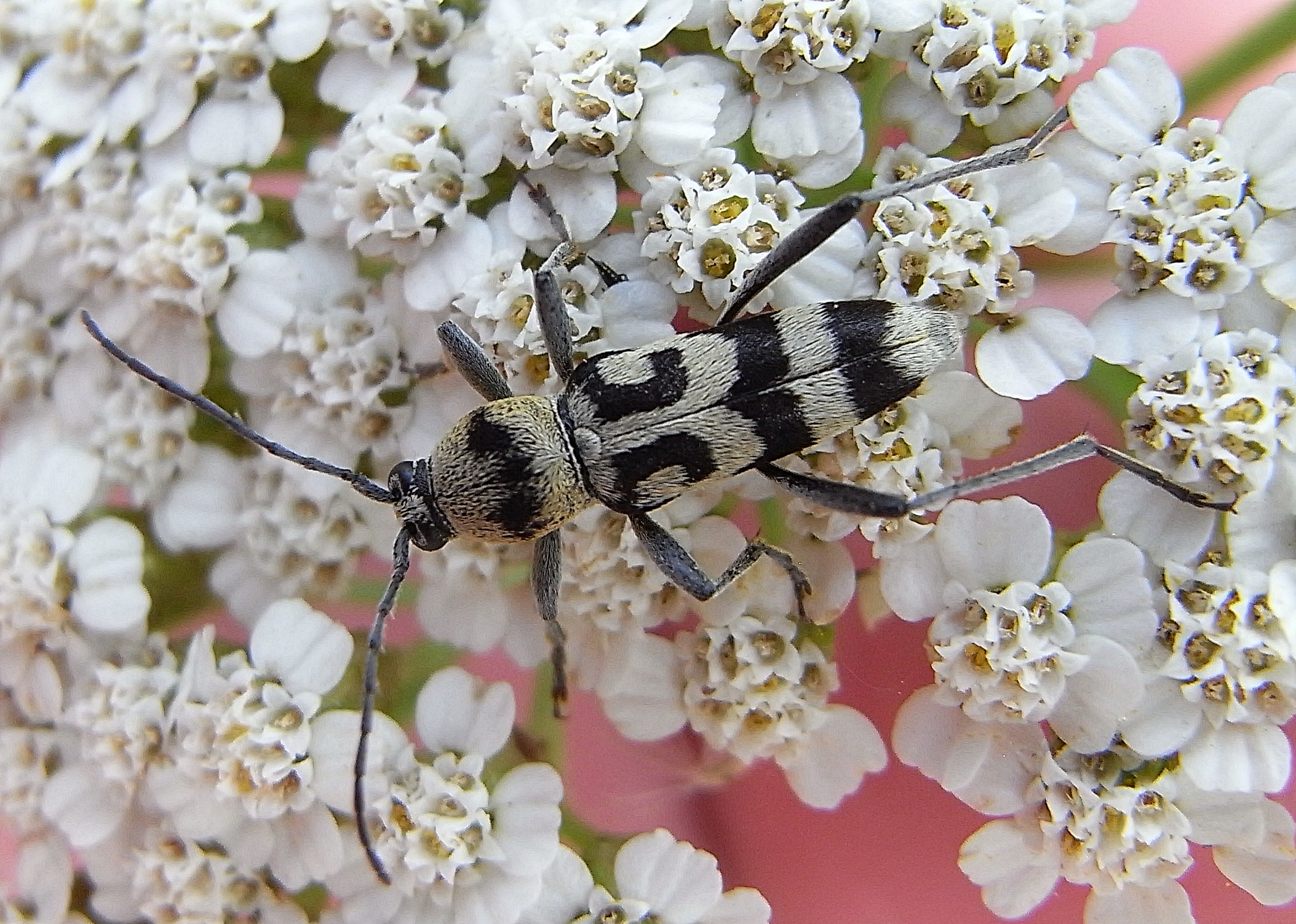
Chlorophorus varius varius var. incarnus

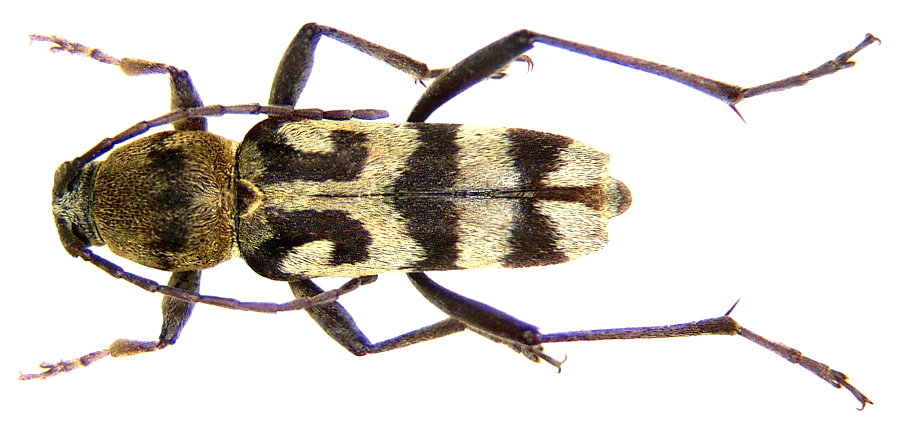
Male. Mounted specimen
