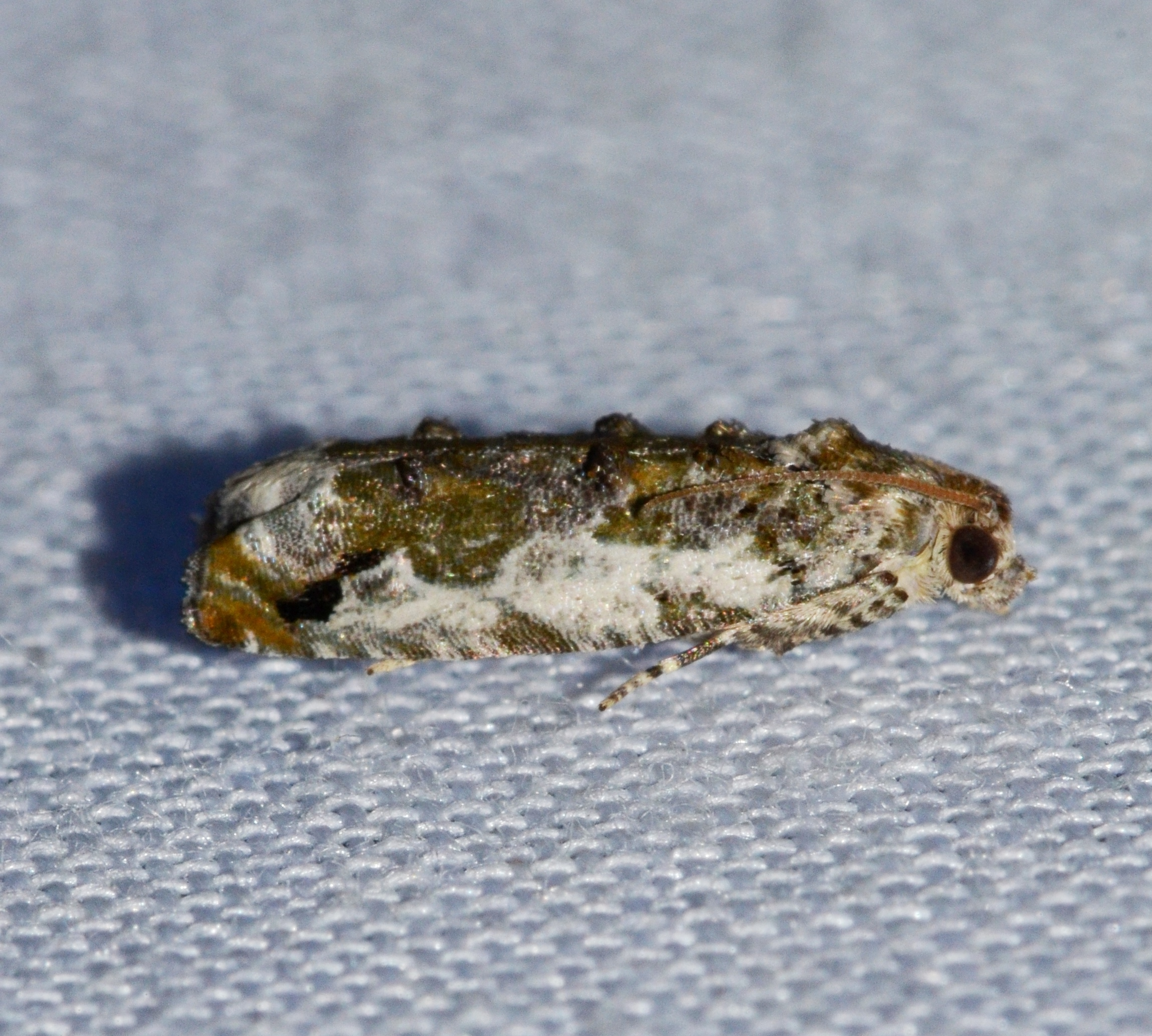
- Proteoteras naracana

Scientific classification
- Domain: Eukaryota
- Kingdom: Animalia
- Phylum: Arthropoda
- Class: Insecta
- Order: Lepidoptera
- Family: Tortricidae
- Tribe: Eucosmini
- Genus: Proteoteras; Riley, 1881

= Proteoteras =

Genus of tortrix moths

Proteoteras (boxelder twig borer moth) is a genus of moths belonging to the subfamily Olethreutinae of the family Tortricidae.

== Species ==
- Proteoteras aesculana Riley, 1881
- Proteoteras arizonae Kearfott, 1907
- Proteoteras crescentana Kearfott, 1907
- Proteoteras implicata Heinrich, 1924
- Proteoteras moffatiana Fernald, 1905
- Proteoteras naracana Kearfott, 1907
- Proteoteras obnigrana Heinrich, 1923
- Proteoteras willingana (Kearfott, 1904)

== See also ==
- List of Tortricidae genera
