= Roguing =

Agricultural act

In agriculture, roguing is the act of identifying and removing plants with undesirable characteristics from agricultural fields. Rogues are removed from the fields to preserve the quality of the crop being grown. Plants being removed may be diseased, of an unwanted variety, or undesirable for other reasons. For example, to ensure that the crop retains its integrity in terms of certain physical attributes, such as color and shape, individual plants that exhibit differing traits may be removed. Roguing is particularly important when growing seed crops, to prevent plants with undesirable characteristics from propagating into subsequent generations.
