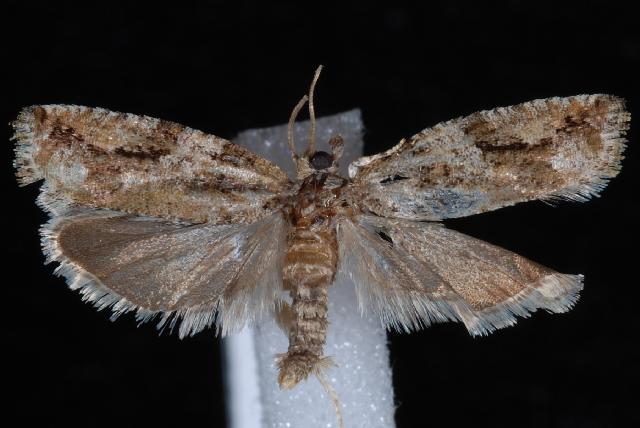

Scientific classification
- Kingdom: Animalia
- Phylum: Arthropoda
- Class: Insecta
- Order: Lepidoptera
- Family: Tortricidae
- Genus: Proteoteras
- Species: P. aesculana

Binomial name
- Proteoteras aesculana Riley, 1881

= Proteoteras aesculana =

Species of moth

Proteoteras aesculana, the maple twig borer, early proteoteras or maple tip moth, is a moth of the family Tortricidae. It is found from coast to coast in the northern United States, south to Mississippi in the east and to California in the west. It has a scattered distribution in Canada, from Nova Scotia to southern Alberta.

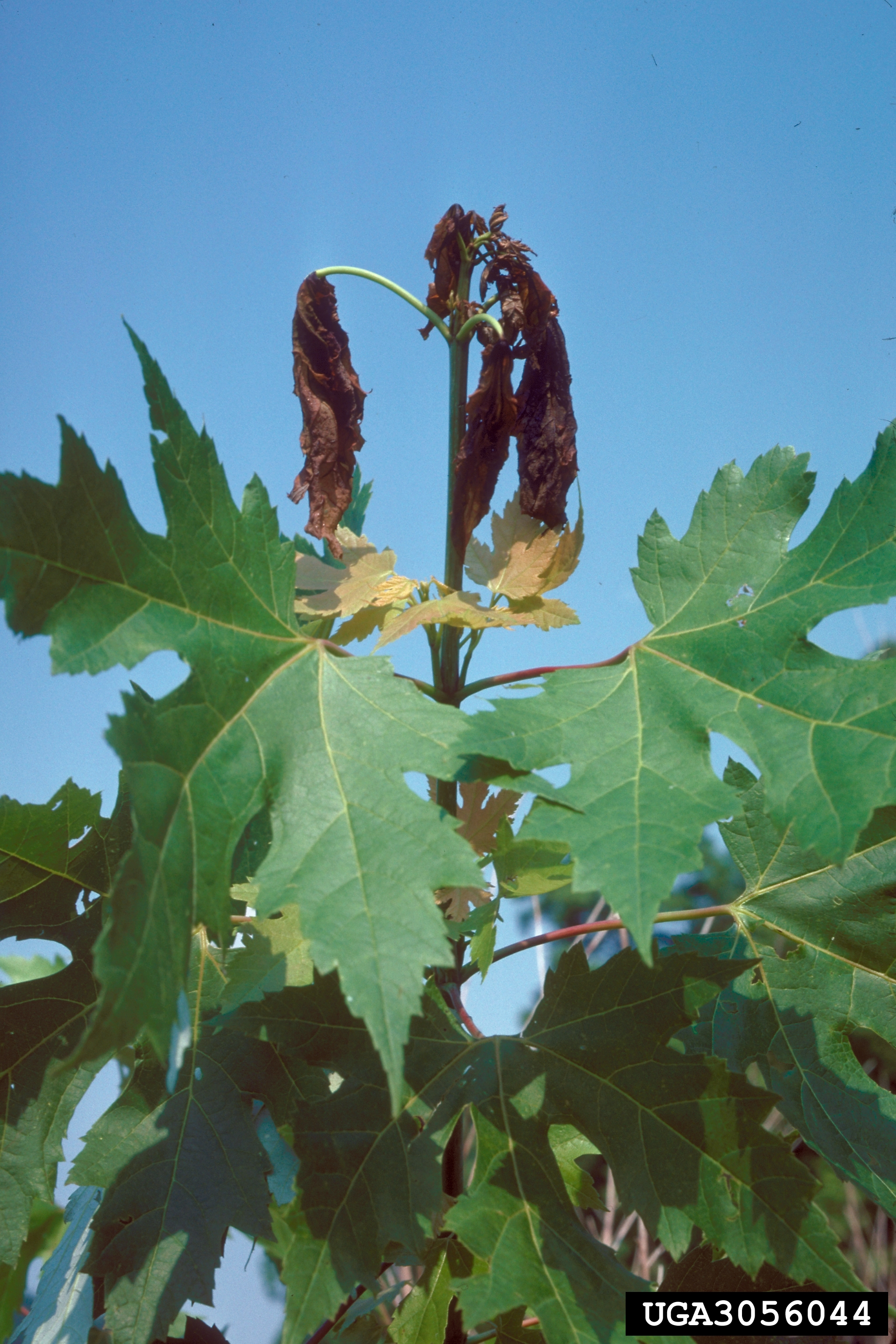
Damage

The wingspan is 11–18 mm.
