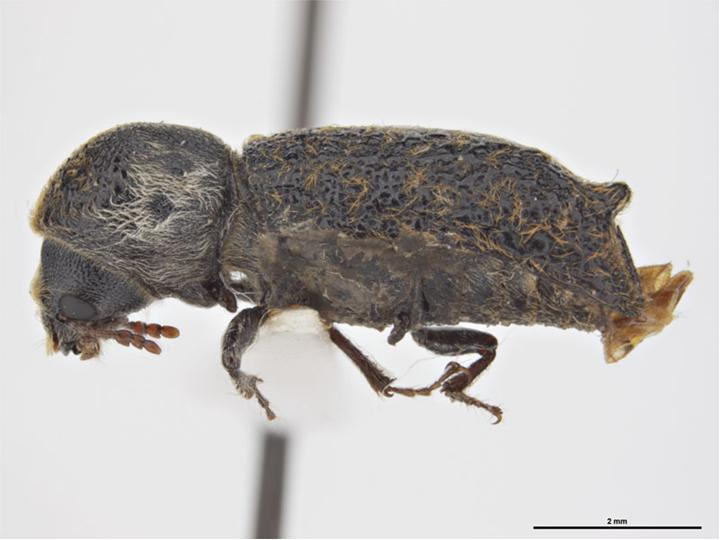

Scientific classification
- Kingdom: Animalia
- Phylum: Arthropoda
- Clade: Pancrustacea
- Class: Insecta
- Order: Coleoptera
- Suborder: Polyphaga
- Family: Bostrichidae
- Genus: Amphicerus
- Species: A. bimaculatus

Binomial name
- Amphicerus bimaculatus (Olivier, 1790)

= Amphicerus bimaculatus =

Species of beetle

Amphicerus bimaculatus, also known as the grape cane borer beetle, is a species of horned powder-post beetle in the family Bostrichidae. It is found in Africa, Europe and Northern Asia (excluding China), and North America.
