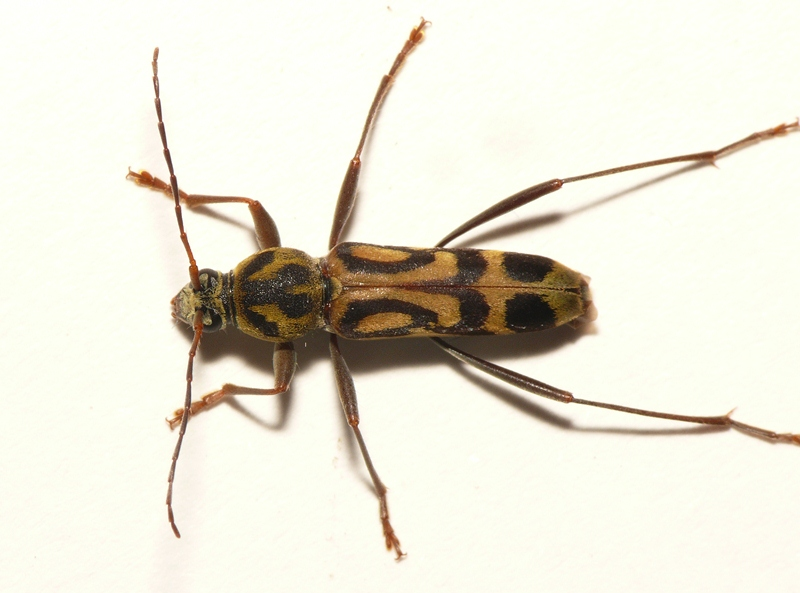

Scientific classification
- Kingdom: Animalia
- Phylum: Arthropoda
- Clade: Pancrustacea
- Class: Insecta
- Order: Coleoptera
- Suborder: Polyphaga
- Infraorder: Cucujiformia
- Family: Cerambycidae
- Genus: Chlorophorus
- Species: C. annularis

Binomial name
- Chlorophorus annularis (Fabricius, 1787)

= Chlorophorus annularis =

Beetle pest of bamboo, citrus, others

Chlorophorus annularis - the bamboo tiger longicorn, or bamboo borer - is a species of beetle in the family Cerambycidae.

== Hosts ==
Citrus spp., Vitis spp., Bambusa spp., Bambusa multiplex, Bambusa polymorpha, Bambusa tulda, Bambusa vulgaris, Dendrocalamus strictus, Dipterocarpus tuberculatus, Gossypium spp., Indosasa crassiflora, Phyllostachys reticulata, Saccharum officinarum, Sinocalamus spp., Zea mays, Bambusa spinosa, Derris microphylla, Liquidambar spp., Liquidambar formosana, Pyrus malus, Shorea spp., Shorea robusta, Sinobambusa gibbosa, Spondias spp., Tectona spp., and Tectona grandis.

== Control ==
=== Quarantine ===
Although methyl bromide is effective, it is an ozone depleting chemical. Sulfuryl fluoride is also effective and does not have that problem.
