= Oberea deficiens =

Scientific classification
- Kingdom: Animalia
- Phylum: Arthropoda
- Class: Insecta
- Order: Coleoptera
- Suborder: Polyphaga
- Infraorder: Cucujiformia
- Family: Cerambycidae
- Genus: Oberea
- Species: O. deficiens

Binomial name
- Oberea deficiens Casey, 1924

Species of beetle

Oberea deficiens is a species of beetle in the family Cerambycidae. It was described by Thomas Lincoln Casey Jr. in 1924. It is known from Canada.
