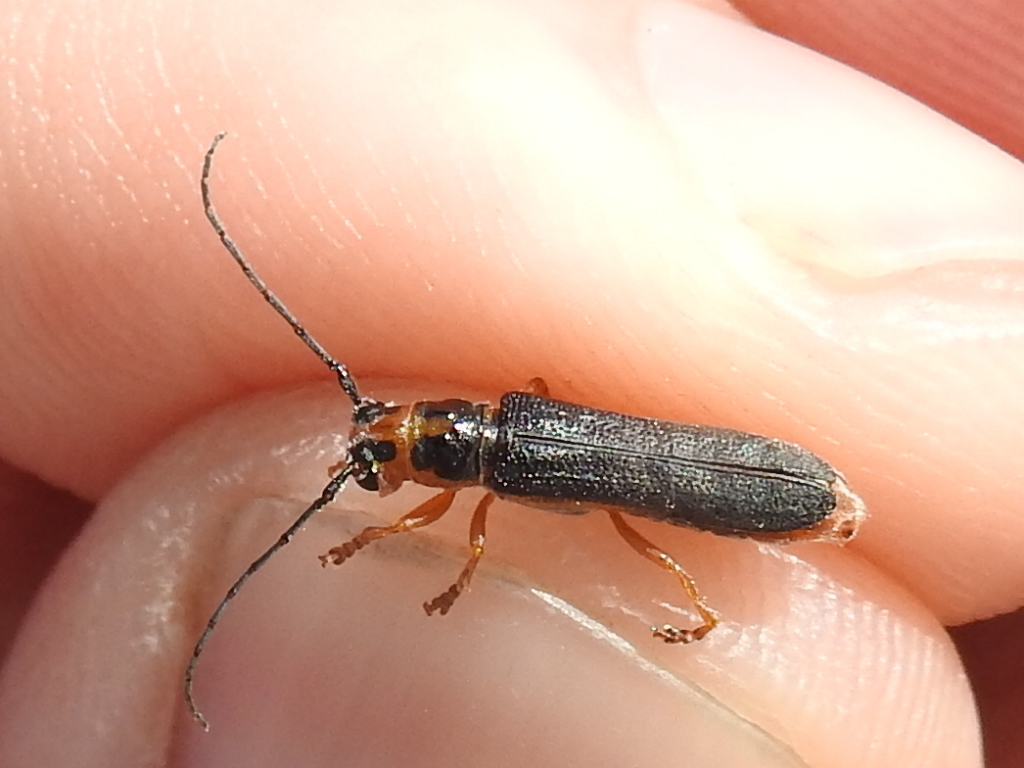

Scientific classification
- Domain: Eukaryota
- Kingdom: Animalia
- Phylum: Arthropoda
- Class: Insecta
- Order: Coleoptera
- Suborder: Polyphaga
- Infraorder: Cucujiformia
- Family: Cerambycidae
- Genus: Oberea
- Species: O. delongi

Binomial name
- Oberea delongi Knull, 1928

= Oberea delongi =

Species of beetle

Oberea delongi is a species of flat-faced longhorn beetle in the tribe Saperdini in the genus Oberea, discovered by Knull in 1928.
