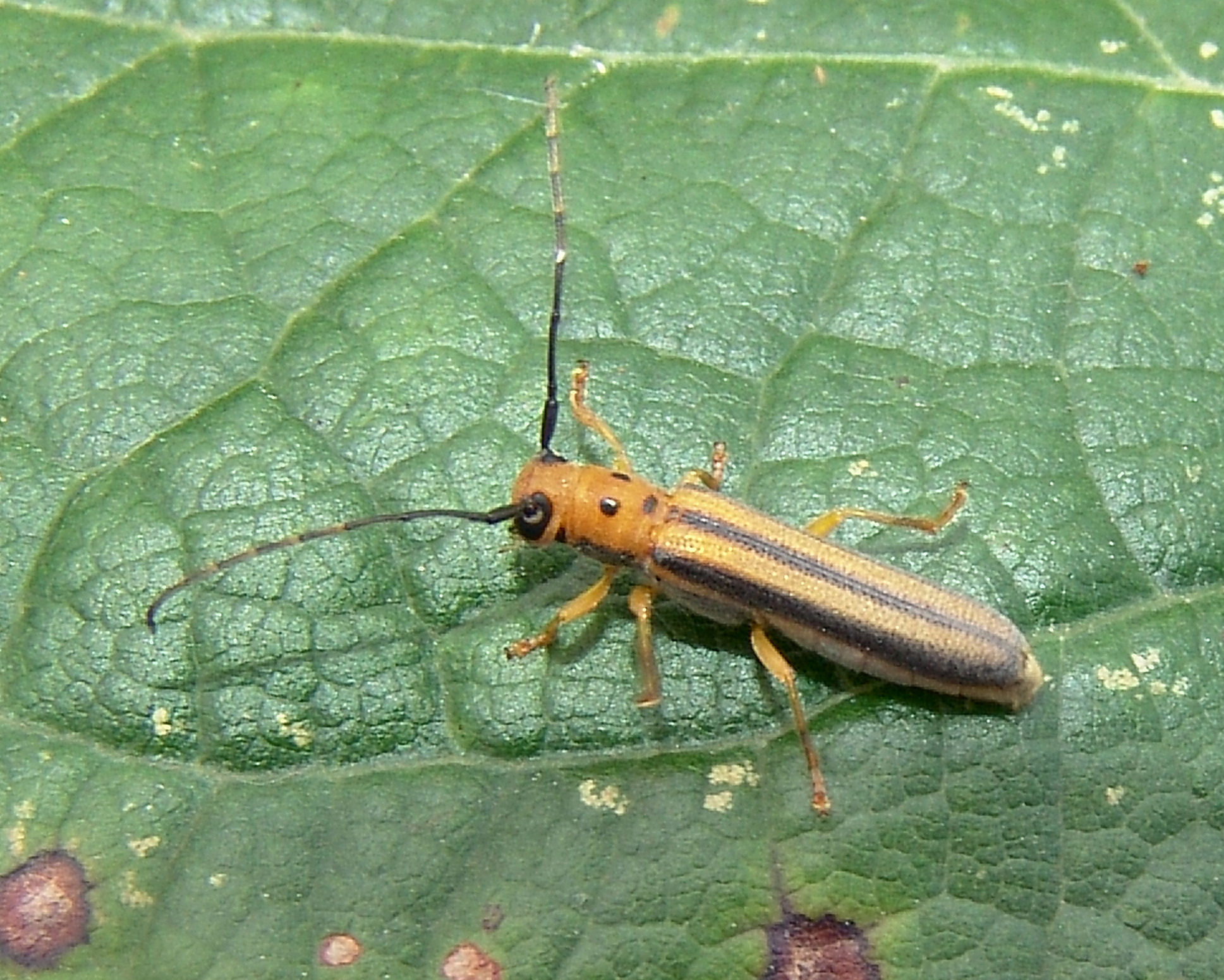

Scientific classification
- Kingdom: Animalia
- Phylum: Arthropoda
- Clade: Pancrustacea
- Class: Insecta
- Order: Coleoptera
- Suborder: Polyphaga
- Infraorder: Cucujiformia
- Family: Cerambycidae
- Genus: Oberea
- Species: O. tripunctata

Binomial name
- Oberea tripunctata Swederus, 1787

= Oberea tripunctata =

Species of beetle

Oberea tripunctata, the dogwood twig borer, is a species of longhorn beetle that is a widespread pest that attacks dogwood trees.

== Morphology ==
Dogwood twig borer adults have slender, elongated bodies like many other beetles of the genus Oberea. They are between 10 and 15 millimeters long and 3 millimeters wide. The head is dark to black and there are three prominent black spots arranged in a triangle on the beetles' thorax. The wing covers are a yellowish tan. There is a narrow black line on the inner edge and a broader, darker line on the outer wing on the lateral margin. There are also two distinct dots right behind the beetle's head.

The larvae of dogwood twig borers, in their final phase, are yellowish, legless and about 19 millimeters long.

== Diet ==
The dogwood twig borer is distributed in the United States of America wherever there are flowering dogwood trees. They are adaptable and although the bulk of a dogwood twig borer's diet is obtained from flowering dogwood trees, it can also feed on elm, azalea, and viburnum. Many species of fruit trees are attacked by the beetle. The beetle usually begins its infestation by attacking individual twigs, so wilting leaves on twigs and drooping and girdling of twig tips most likely indicate an infestation by the dogwood twig borer.

== Pest control ==
To control the dogwood twig borer, a common practice is to clip infested twigs several inches below the girdle, or the infected part of the twig, and then destroy it. This is usually done after wilting occurs, but before adult emergence during spring. This method is commonly recommended and has proved very effective at controlling the population of the dogwood twig borer. Another technique of eliminating the beetle is to spray with recommended insecticides before budding of the infected tree or shrub.

The species is considered a minor pest of the dogwood. It usually does not cause any major problems, unlike the dogwood borer (Synanthedon scitula).

== Life cycle ==
Dogwood twig borer adults emerge in early June, rarely in large numbers. They feed on dogwood twigs and cause girdling around the tips of branches. Females lay their eggs singly on healthy twigs. When the eggs hatch, larvae enter the twig and bore down into the centre. Parts of the twig are sometimes internally separated from the dogwood as a series of closely packed holes are drilled to remove the boring dust (frass). The beetle larvae winter in the stems. Some larvae continue to develop for up to two years. Larvae that pupate during the spring usually emerge from the stem between the middle of May and early June. Dogwood twig borer larvae are sometimes called Elm twig girdlers.
