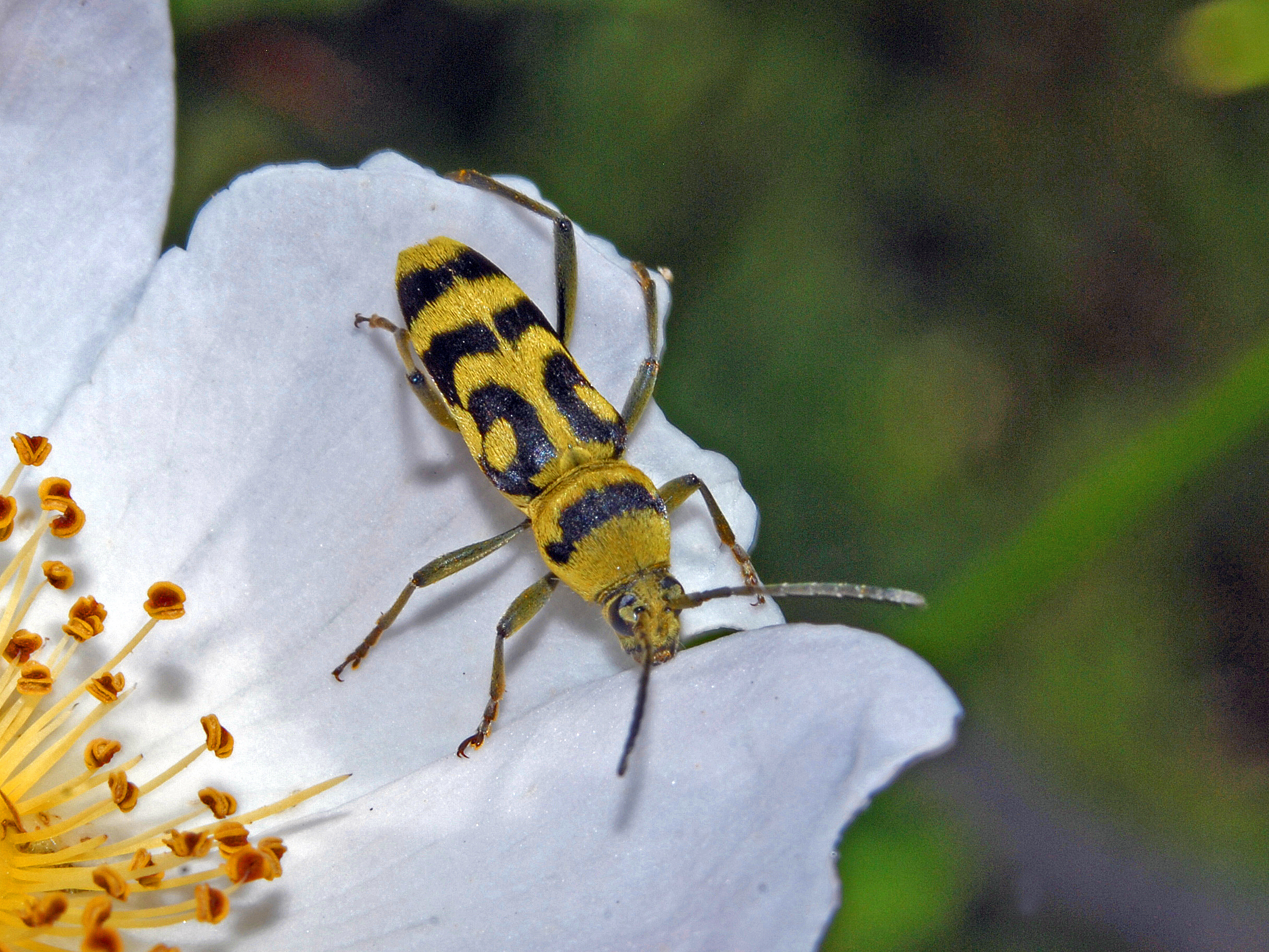
- Chlorophorus varius

Scientific classification
- Kingdom: Animalia
- Phylum: Arthropoda
- Class: Insecta
- Order: Coleoptera
- Suborder: Polyphaga
- Infraorder: Cucujiformia
- Family: Cerambycidae
- Tribe: Clytini
- Genus: Chlorophorus; Chevrolat, 1863

= Chlorophorus =

Genus of beetles

Chlorophorus is a genus of round-necked longhorn beetles belonging to the family Cerambycidae, subfamily Cerambycinae.

== Species ==
Species within this genus include:

- Chlorophorus abnepos Viktora, 2020
- Chlorophorus abruptulus Holzschuh, 1992
- Chlorophorus abyssinicus Aurivillius, 1921
- Chlorophorus acrocarpi Gardner, 1942
- Chlorophorus adelii Holzschuh, 1974
- Chlorophorus adlbaueri Dauber, 2002
- Chlorophorus adventicus Holzschuh, 2017
- Chlorophorus aegyptiacus (Fabricius, 1775)
- Chlorophorus agnatus Chevrolat, 1863
- Chlorophorus albopunctatus (Pic, 1916)
- Chlorophorus alboscutellatus Chevrolat, 1863
- Chlorophorus alfredpuchneri Schmid, 2014
- Chlorophorus alni Holzschuh, 1982
- Chlorophorus amami Hayashi, 1968
- Chlorophorus amoenus Laporte & Gory, 1836
- Chlorophorus ancora (Jordan, 1903)
- Chlorophorus angustulus (Macleay, 1886)
- Chlorophorus annamensis Pic, 1953
- Chlorophorus annularis (Fabricius, 1787)
- Chlorophorus annularoides Holzschuh, 1983
- Chlorophorus annulatus (Hope, 1831)
- Chlorophorus anticeconjunctus Pic, 1943
- Chlorophorus anticemaculata Schwarzer, 1925
- Chlorophorus anulifer Heller, 1926
- Chlorophorus apertulus Holzschuh, 1992
- Chlorophorus arciferus (Chevrolat, 1863)
- Chlorophorus arfakensis Viktora, 2019
- Chlorophorus aritai (Ohbayashi, 1964)
- Chlorophorus assimilis (Hope, 1931)
- Chlorophorus audax Viktora, 2019
- Chlorophorus aurantiacus Aurivillius, 1911
- Chlorophorus aurivillianus Plavilstshikov, 1921
- Chlorophorus aurivilliusi Schwarzer, 1926
- Chlorophorus austerus (Chevrolat, 1863)
- Chlorophorus bakeri Aurivillius, 1922
- Chlorophorus basilanus Heller, 1926
- Chlorophorus basispilus (Jordan, 1903)
- Chlorophorus belum Viktora, 2019
- Chlorophorus biinterruptus Pic, 1943
- Chlorophorus bonengensis Gressitt & Rondon, 1970
- Chlorophorus boninensis Kano, 1933
- Chlorophorus borneensis Fisher, 1935
- Chlorophorus brevenotatus Pic, 1922
- Chlorophorus butleri Pic, 1920
- Chlorophorus capensis (Castelnau & Gory, 1836)
- Chlorophorus capillatus Holzschuh, 2006
- Chlorophorus caragana Xie & Wang, 2012
- Chlorophorus carinatus Aurivillius 1913
- Chlorophorus castaneorufus Fairmaire, 1895
- Chlorophorus chiue Nakamura, 1974
- Chlorophorus cingalensis (Gahan, 1906)
- Chlorophorus circularis Holzschuh, 2003
- Chlorophorus clemenceaui Pic, 1918
- Chlorophorus congruus Holzschuh 2003
- Chlorophorus coniperda Holzschuh, 1992
- Chlorophorus convexifrons Holzschuh, 1981
- Chlorophorus copiosus Holzschuh, 1991
- Chlorophorus coruscus Holzschuh, 2017
- Chlorophorus crassipes Pesarini & Sabbadini 2015
- Chlorophorus cursor Rapuzzi & Sama, 1999
- Chlorophorus curvatofasciatus Aurivillius, 1922
- Chlorophorus dahanshanus Niisato & Chou, 2017
- Chlorophorus damascenus (Chevrolat, 1854)
- Chlorophorus decoratus (Pascoe, 1869)
- Chlorophorus deterrens Pascoe, 1862
- Chlorophorus dimidiatus Aurivillius, 1922
- Chlorophorus dinae Rapuzzi & Sama, 1999
- Chlorophorus distiguendus Perroud, 1855
- Chlorophorus diversicolor Holzschuh, 2016
- Chlorophorus dodsi Peringuey, 1908
- Chlorophorus dohertii Gahan, 1906
- Chlorophorus dominator Viktora, 2019
- Chlorophorus dominici Sama, 1996
- Chlorophorus douei (Chevrolat, 1863)
- Chlorophorus drouini Viktora, 2019
- Chlorophorus drumonti Dauber, 2004
- Chlorophorus duo (Fairmaire, 1888)
- Chlorophorus dureli Pic, 1950
- Chlorophorus durvillei (Laporte & Gory, 1841)
- Chlorophorus eckweileri Holzschuh, 1992
- Chlorophorus elaeagni Plavilstshikov 1956
- Chlorophorus eleodes (Fairmaire, 1889)
- Chlorophorus emili Viktora, 2021
- Chlorophorus eximius Aurivillius, 1911
- Chlorophorus exploratus Viktora, 2019
- Chlorophorus externenotatus Pic, 1925
- Chlorophorus externesignatus Pic, 1936
- Chlorophorus faldermanni (Faldermann, 1837)
- Chlorophorus favieri (Fairmaire, 1873)
- Chlorophorus fictus Viktora, 2019
- Chlorophorus flavopubescens Hayashi, 1968
- Chlorophorus fraternus Holzschuh, 1992
- Chlorophorus fristedti (Aurivillius, 1893)
- Chlorophorus funebris Gressitt & Rondon, 1970
- Chlorophorus furcillatus Holzschuh, 1989
- Chlorophorus furtivus Gressitt & Rondon, 1970
- Chlorophorus gaudens Holzschuh, 1992
- Chlorophorus glaucus (Fabricius, 1781)
- Chlorophorus golestanicus Vorisek, 2011
- Chlorophorus grandipes Pic, 1943
- Chlorophorus graphus Holzschuh, 1998
- Chlorophorus gratiosus (Marseul, 1868)
- Chlorophorus griseomaculatus Pic, 1925
- Chlorophorus grosseri Sama & Rapuzzi, 2011
- Chlorophorus hainanicus Gressitt, 1940
- Chlorophorus hariolus Viktora, 2019
- Chlorophorus hauseri Pic, 1931
- Chlorophorus hederatus Heller, 1926
- Chlorophorus hefferni Dauber, 2002
- Chlorophorus henriettae Holzschuh, 1984
- Chlorophorus hircanus (Pic, 1905)
- Chlorophorus hirsutulus Gressitt & Rondon, 1970
- Chlorophorus hovorkai Schmid, 2015
- Chlorophorus hrabovskyi Kratochvíl, 1985
- Chlorophorus hubenyi Viktora, 2019
- Chlorophorus huilaensis Schmid, 2015
- Chlorophorus hungaricus Seidlitz, 1891
- Chlorophorus ictericus Holzschuh, 1991
- Chlorophorus ignobilis (Bates, 1878)
- Chlorophorus impressithorax Pic, 1950
- Chlorophorus inhumeralis Pic, 1918
- Chlorophorus insidiosus Holzschuh, 1986
- Chlorophorus intactus Holzschuh, 1992
- Chlorophorus interneconnexus Pic, 1925
- Chlorophorus jacobsoni Schwarzer, 1926
- Chlorophorus javanus Pic, 1943
- Chlorophorus jendeki Holzschuh, 1992
- Chlorophorus jucundus Perroud 1855
- Chlorophorus juheli Adlbauer, 2003
- Chlorophorus kabateki Holzschuh, 1998
- Chlorophorus kanekoi Matsushita, 1941
- Chlorophorus kanoi Hayashi, 1963
- Chlorophorus karausi Viktora, 2021
- Chlorophorus kejvali Holzschuh, 2003
- Chlorophorus kinganus (Pic, 1903)
- Chlorophorus kobayashii Komiya, 1976
- Chlorophorus krantzi Gahan, 1904
- Chlorophorus kusamai Sato, 1999
- Chlorophorus latens Viktora, 2019
- Chlorophorus latus Dauber, 2010
- Chlorophorus lineatus Dauber, 2002
- Chlorophorus lingnanensis Gressitt, 1951
- Chlorophorus linsleyi Gressitt & Rondon, 1970
- Chlorophorus lituratus (Laporte & Gory, 1836)
- Chlorophorus ludens Gahan, 1894
- Chlorophorus luxatus (Pascoe, 1869)
- Chlorophorus macaumensis (Chevrolat, 1845)
- Chlorophorus malaccanus Pic, 1925
- Chlorophorus manillae Aurivillius, 1911
- Chlorophorus marginalis (Chevrolat, 1863)
- Chlorophorus masatakai Niisato & Karube, 2006
- Chlorophorus medanensis Pic, 1925
- Chlorophorus mediolineatus Pic, 1925
- Chlorophorus melancholicus Chevrolat, 1906
- Chlorophorus micheli Pic, 1950
- Chlorophorus minamiiwo Satô & Ohbayashi, 1982
- Chlorophorus minutus Aurivillius, 1922
- Chlorophorus miwai Gressitt, 1936
- Chlorophorus mjoebergii Aurivillius, 1917
- Chlorophorus moestus Chevrolat, 1863
- Chlorophorus monachus Viktora, 2020
- Chlorophorus montanus (Nonfried, 1894)
- Chlorophorus moultoni Aurivillius, 1911
- Chlorophorus moupinensis (Fairmaire, 1888)
- Chlorophorus muscifluvis Gressitt, 1951
- Chlorophorus mushanus (Bates, 1873)
- Chlorophorus namibiensis Adlbauer & Dauber, 1999
- Chlorophorus navratili Holzschuh, 1981
- Chlorophorus nepalensis Hayashi, 1979
- Chlorophorus niehuisi Adlbauer, 1992
- Chlorophorus nigerrimus (Chevrolat, 1863)
- Chlorophorus nivipictus (Kraatz, 1879)
- Chlorophorus nodai Makihara, 1986
- Chlorophorus nouphati Gressitt & Rondon, 1970
- Chlorophorus obliteratus (Ganglbauer, 1889)
- Chlorophorus oezdikmeni Sama & Rapuzzi, 2011
- Chlorophorus optabilis Viktora, 2019
- Chlorophorus orbatus Holzschuh, 1991
- Chlorophorus palavanicus Aurivillius, 1922
- Chlorophorus parens Allard, 1894
- Chlorophorus patricius (Gahan, 1906)
- Chlorophorus pelleteri (Laporte & Gory, 1836)
- Chlorophorus perornatus Jordan, 1894
- Chlorophorus perroti Fuchs, 1966
- Chlorophorus petaini Pic, 1943
- Chlorophorus pinguis Holzschuh, 1992
- Chlorophorus praecanus Holzschuh, 2006
- Chlorophorus praetextus (Pascoe, 1869)
- Chlorophorus proannulatus Gressitt & Rondon, 1970
- Chlorophorus probsti Holzschuh, 1989
- Chlorophorus procus Viktora, 2019
- Chlorophorus prodromus Viktora, 2020
- Chlorophorus pseudoswatensis Holzschuh, 1983
- Chlorophorus quatuordecimmaculatus (Chevrolat, 1863)
- Chlorophorus rectefasciatus Dauber, 2012
- Chlorophorus ringenbachi Sama, 2004
- Chlorophorus ringleticus Viktora, 2019
- Chlorophorus robustior (Pic, 1900)
- Chlorophorus rotundicollis Dauber, 2010
- Chlorophorus rubricollis (Laporte & Gory, 1836)
- Chlorophorus ruficornis (Olivier, 1790)
- Chlorophorus rufimembris Gressitt & Rondon, 1970
- Chlorophorus sagittarius Gahan, 1906
- Chlorophorus salicicola Holzschuh, 1993
- Chlorophorus salomonum (Aurivillius, 1908)
- Chlorophorus sappho Gressitt & Rondon, 1970
- Chlorophorus savuensis Viktora, 2020
- Chlorophorus scenicus (Pascoe, 1869)
- Chlorophorus scriptus (Dalman in Schoenherr, 1817)
- Chlorophorus seclusus (Pascoe, 1869)
- Chlorophorus semiformosus Pic, 1908
- Chlorophorus semikanoi Hayashi, 1974
- Chlorophorus seniculus Holzschuh, 2006
- Chlorophorus separatus Gressitt, 1940
- Chlorophorus sexguttatus (Lucas, 1849)
- Chlorophorus shoreae Gardner, 1941
- Chlorophorus siegriedae Holzschuh, 1993
- Chlorophorus signaticollis (Laporte & Gory, 1836)
- Chlorophorus signatipennis Gahan, 1907
- Chlorophorus smithi Gressitt, 1941
- Chlorophorus socius (Gahan, 1906)
- Chlorophorus sollicitus Viktora, 2019
- Chlorophorus sparsus (Reitter, 1886)
- Chlorophorus strobilicola Champion, 1918
- Chlorophorus sulcaticeps (Pic, 1924)
- Chlorophorus sumatrensis (Laporte & Gory, 1836)
- Chlorophorus sumbavae Aurivillius, 1911
- Chlorophorus swatensis Holzschuh, 1974
- Chlorophorus t-nigrum Jordan, 1894
- Chlorophorus taihorensis Schwarzer, 1925
- Chlorophorus taiwanus Matsushita, 1933
- Chlorophorus tixieri (Pic, 1902)
- Chlorophorus tohokensis Hayashi, 1968
- Chlorophorus tonkineus Fairmaire, 1895
- Chlorophorus torquilla Pascoe, 1869
- Chlorophorus touzalini Pic, 1920
- Chlorophorus tredecimmaculatus (Chevrolat, 1836)
- Chlorophorus trifasciatus (Fabricius, 1781)
- Chlorophorus trivialis Holzschuh, 2010
- Chlorophorus trusmadensis Dauber, 2006
- Chlorophorus tsitoensis (Fairmaire, 1888)
- Chlorophorus undosus Viktora, 2014
- Chlorophorus ursus Viktora, 2020
- Chlorophorus varius (Muller, 1766)
- Chlorophorus vartianae Holzschuh, 1974
- Chlorophorus vehemens Holzschuh, 2009
- Chlorophorus verus Holzschuh, 1998
- Chlorophorus vicinus Dauber, 2002
- Chlorophorus viridulus Kano, 1933
- Chlorophorus viticis Gressitt & Rondon, 1970
- Chlorophorus vulpinus Holzschuh, 1992
- Chlorophorus werneri Adlbauer & Bjornstad, 2012
- Chlorophorus wewalkai Holzschuh, 1969
- Chlorophorus yachovi Sama, 1996
- Chlorophorus yakitai Niisato, 2005
- Chlorophorus yamdenaensis Viktora, 2020
- Chlorophorus yayeyamensis Kano, 1933
- Chlorophorus yedoensis (Kano, 1933)
- Chlorophorus zelus Holzschuh, 1989
- Chlorophorus ziczac Holzschuh, 2017
