= Integrated pest management (cultural property) =

Monitoring and managing pest and environmental information with pest control methods

Integrated pest management in museums, libraries, archives and private collections is the practice of monitoring and managing pest and environmental information with pest control methods to prevent pest damage to collections and cultural property. Preserving cultural property is the ultimate goal for these institutions. The pests come in many different forms: insects, mites, rodents, bats, birds, and fungi and the two most common types are insects and fungi. It is widely recommended that every museum have some form of pest control in place and monitoring system to protect their collection and that museums review their storage and museum facilities to determine how to best control and prevent pest infestations while utilizing an Integrated Pest Management plan.

== Integrated Pest Management components ==
Museum IPM is a sub specialty of Integrated pest management that focuses specifically on the application in museums and cultural institutions. The primary difference between IPM and Museum IPM is that in the context of a museum, the main focus is placed on the protection of collections from pests.

Integrated Pest Management is a ‘holistic’ approach to controlling pests” that seeks to understand what pests are attracted to, their habits, and life cycles. Part of this program is to identify what types of pests are located in the building, establish the museum's short- and long-term goals for their IPM program, and build a consensus amongst the staff. The museum should “consult experts if necessary and choose the most appropriate and safe control methods for (the) eradication” of the pests. It is important not to panic and rush to rash decisions if a few pests are discovered. A museum should be thoughtful and plan out of their steps before taking any action.

Integrated Pest Management requires the museum to allocate time and energy for the implementation and monitoring the progress of their program. An IPM program “will require the coordinated effort of all staff members to properly implement, and may initially be more expensive than traditional pest management”.

=== Implementation ===
The implementation of integrated pest management should be done in steps. To begin, a museum should review a floor plan of the building and determine all “doors, windows, water and heat sources, and drains”, as well as all furniture and other objects within the museum. The museum can place traps that have been numbered and dated throughout the building using the floor plan as a guide of potential problem areas. The location of the traps should be documented and marked on the floor plan. Once the traps are in place, they should be monitored. Detailed notes should be made on the finding in the traps, which pests are being trapped, how they are accessing the museum, and what do these trapped pests look for in a food source. After the first few months, the trap placement should be refined to insure the best outcome.

=== Isolation and quarantine of any infested cultural objects ===
Before any new items or objects enter the collection storage area, the contents should be inspected for any signs of insect activity. If an object is found, or even thought to be infested, it should be immediately isolated and put into quarantine. The museum should next look to identify the pest and determine what type of harm the pests can cause. Infested objects should be place into sealed plastic bags before moving them into the collection area. It is important to secure the object and make sure that no other eggs or larvae fall from the object and possibly spread the infestation. The objects around the quarantined object should also be examined to determine the extent of the infestation.

=== Monitoring and Inspection ===
The museum must monitor all of their pest management programs to ensure they are effective. Routine monitoring will provide information about the points of entry, amount of insects, where they reside in the building, and what they are feeding on. With this information, a museum will be able to identify the damaged areas and what pests are infesting the museum. The staff should be careful in the placement of these traps to ensure that they do not come into contact with objects from the collection. When traps are placed in a new location in the building they should be checked within the first 48 hours. This will help confirm where the problem areas are located and if adjustments need to be made to the trap locations. The next step should be weekly and then monthly inspections. Once the pests have been identified and the best location confirmed, then the traps should be changed every two months, or sooner if they are full or have lost their stickiness.

When the staff conducts their insect monitoring, the staff member “should use a bright flashlight during inspections, looking for live adults and larvae and the presence of shed larval skins or feces”. It is important for the museum staff to continually review all components of the pest management program and determine if adjustments are needed.

=== Identification and documentation ===
A key component in Integrated Pest Management for museums is the ability to identify the pests causing issues so the museum staff can establish a plan of attack to remove the pest from the building. Traps can be used to identify the pests, the extent of infestation, and determine the source of the infestation. All of the identification information on the pests should be documented to keep track of the pests, points of entry, and potential damage the pest may cause. Having these “records of inspection results...will help identify seasonal risk factors and areas with a high frequency of problems”. The museum should review the data and ask “can we simply remove the pest? are eggs present? what is the least damaging approach to treatment?”. Once a museum have this information written down and confirmed by all those involved in the program, a treatment strategy can be planned and implemented.

=== Treatment action ===
- Traps: Traps are an important part of Integrated Pest Management and they come in different shapes, sizes, and odors. Traps will help to identify the museums pest problem, and should be periodically emptied as the dead pests will attract and be food for other pests. Before any treatment action is executed, it is important to consult the curator, the conservator, and review any history on the object affected.
- Sticky traps: The most common traps are sticky traps or glue boards. These traps should be placed in high risk areas and will provide the museum’s staff insight into the pests that are infesting the building and “can be used to give information on the pest, an indication of their number and seasonal cycles and where they congregate … (the best place these trap are) … in corners, near doors, vents, fireplaces and other potential entry points for insects”. Sticky traps should be inspected weekly and all findings clearly reported.
- Pheromone traps: Pheromone traps have natural scents that attract a target pest group. These traps can serve as an effective warning system, and are typically also deployed with/as sticky traps. Currently pheromone traps are only available for “webbing clothes moths, drug store beetles, cigarette beetles, and the German cockroach, but more are being developed”.
- Light traps: Light Traps emit ultraviolet light to attract moths and flies. Most insects are drawn towards light, but these traps should not be used on their own. Other traps, usually sticky traps, should be installed near light traps to help encourage and trap more pests.
- Chemical control of museum pests: Pesticides should only be used as a last resort as “pesticides used in museum pest control are generally some of the same products used for household or other structural pest control”. These chemicals can be damaging to the health to the staff and to anyone else that visits the building. Chemicals “can cause acute symptoms such as nausea, vomiting, and breathing difficulty”. Chemicals can also cause damage to the museum’s collection such as metal corrosion, deterioration of proteins (fur, feather, leather, and wool), deterioration of paper, stiffening/softening of plastic and change the pigments. Pesticides will do nothing to prevent the infestation, they only kill the pests after the fact, once the damage has already been done. Museum objects should avoid direct treatment, however, if the object requires pesticides to remove pests it should be fumigated. All fumigation should be performed by a professional.

== Common pests in cultural property institutions ==
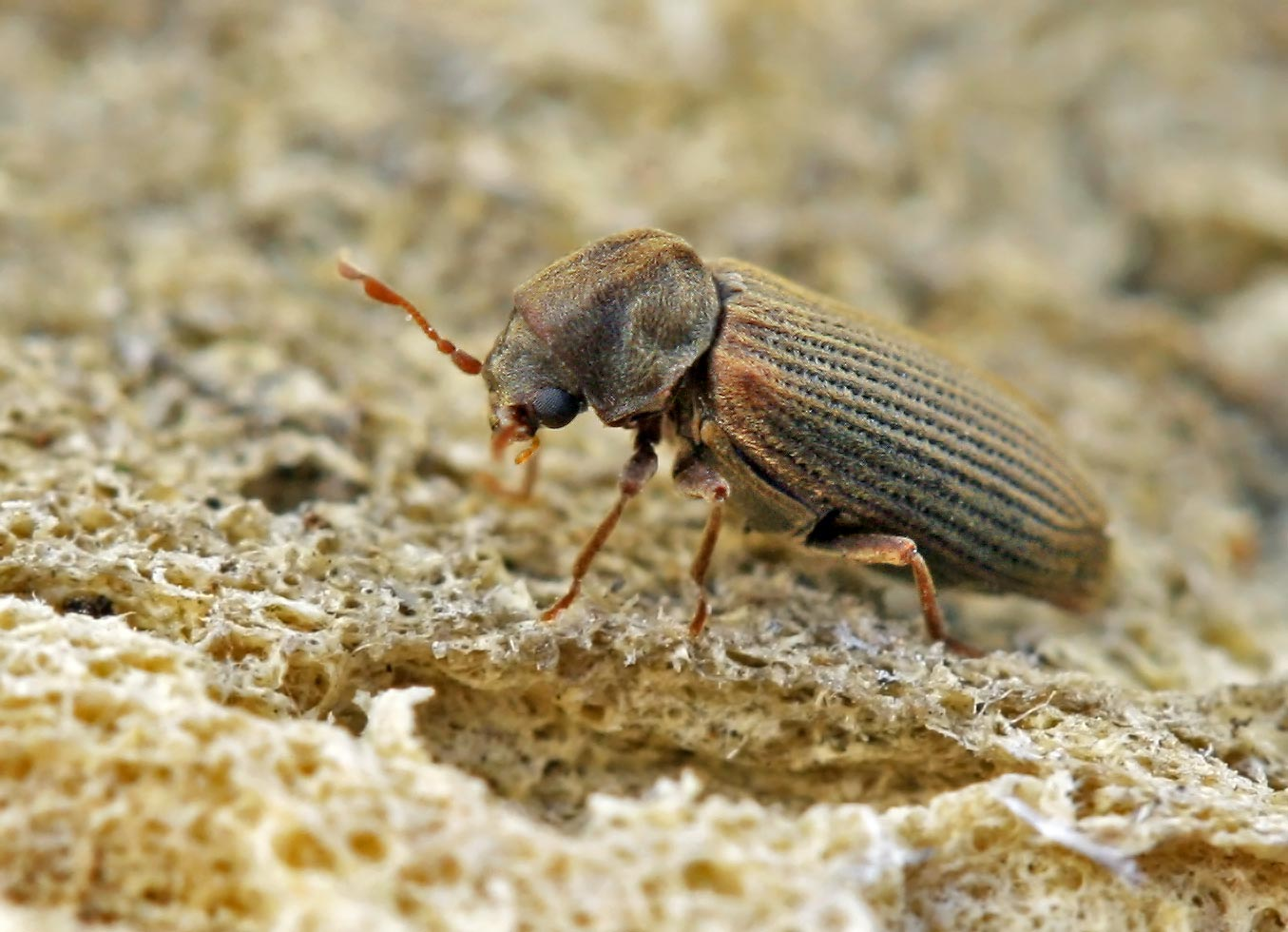
the common furniture beetle or common house borer (Anobium punctatum)

There are many different type of pests that can affect a museum and its collection. It will be important for the museum staff to identify the pests, as well as understand how they will act and what they will feed on. Insects will cause damage not only through their feeding habits but their tracks, tunnel and nesting habits may also cause damage. Most damage will occur when the insect is in its larva stage – when most of the feeding takes place – though some insects like booklice will continue to damage objects past the larva stage. Rodents can cause further damage through the increased risk of fire when they gnaw on wires. Birds and bats can cause indirect damage to cultural materials and are more disruptive to heritage structures. Aside from being a source of inconvenience around the area through their irritating smell and health risks, their introduction of detritus is more concerning for the cultural materials. As they not only cause soiling but also attracts other pests, mainly insects. Fungi (moulds) are ubiquitous and may colonize organic and inorganic materials exposed to adverse environmental conditions, particularly the presence of nutrients and moisture.

=== Insects ===
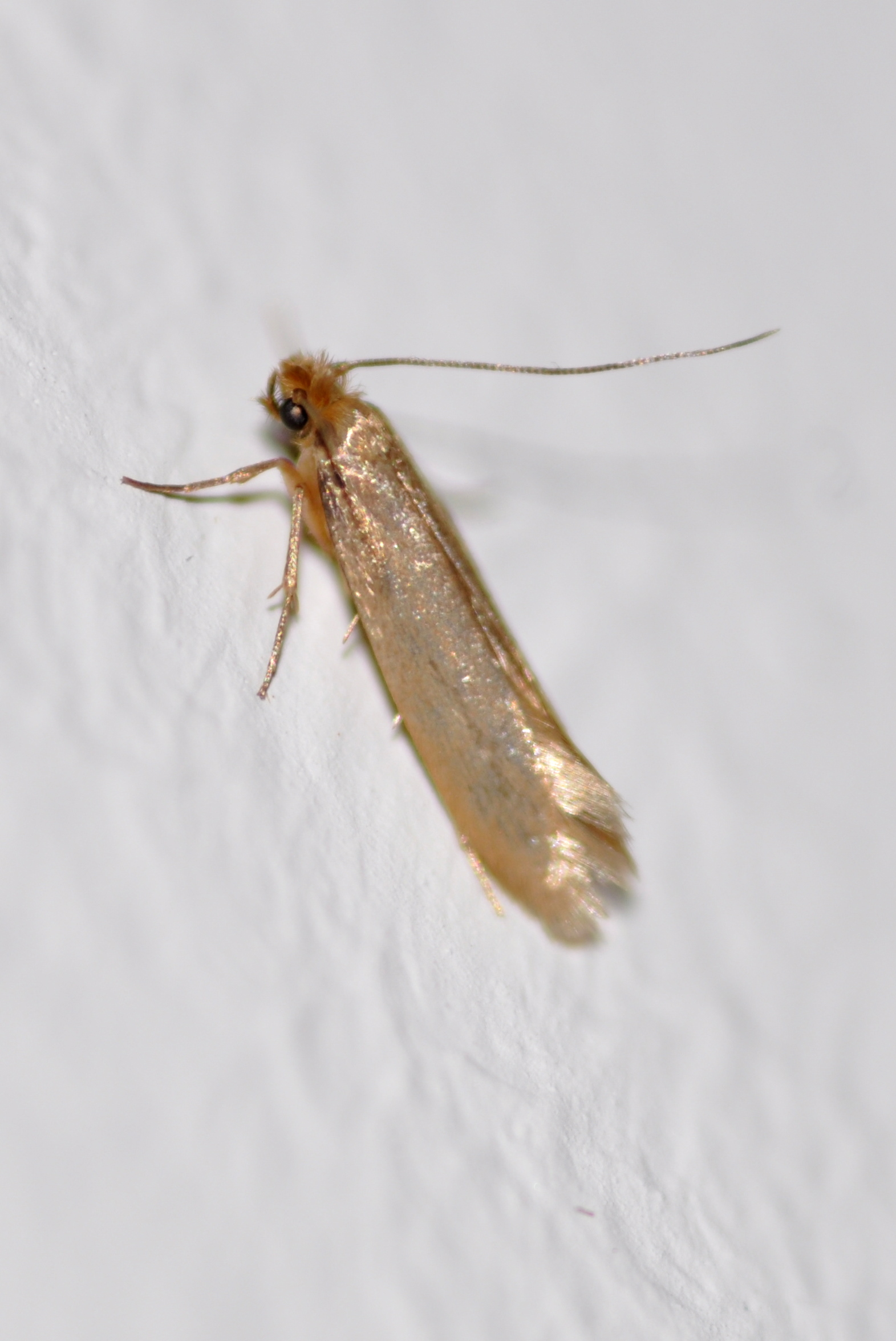
- common clothes moth
  Fabric pests: There are two groups of fabric pests that are common in museums: carpet beetles and clothes moths. These pest eat proteins like wool, fur, feathers, dead animals and horns. These pests are known to burrow into materials such as storage bins or little-used drawers.
- Wood pests: The most common wood pests are woodboring beetles and dry wood termites. These pests are known to attack and damage objects made of wood and often go undetected on the surface as they burrow into the wood.
- Stored product pests: The most common stored product pests or pantry pests are the cigarette beetle and the drugstore beetle. These pests are known to infest “seeds, nuts, grains, spices, dried fruits, and vegetables," items which many museums include.
- Moisture pests: Moisture can be damaging not only to the building but also to the objects in the collection that “may attract a number of moisture-loving pests that can do additional damage”. Mold is damaging on its own but it also attracts pests like Psocoptera to feed on the objects that are affected by mold. It is important for museums to keep their facilities and collection areas free from any dampness and immediately deal with leaks or possible water damage.
- General pests: General pests are any household pests that enter into a building through windows, doors, cracks, and any other entrance to the museum. These pest include cockroaches, rodents, silverfish, and ants and will cause damage to the museum and their objects. The most common damage occurs from the nesting and feeding behaviors.

=== Rodents ===
It will become apparent if your museum has a rodent infestation as the pests leave behind droppings and gnaw marks. Rodents will breed rapidly and begin shredding and nest in objects they come into contact with. Rodents “will not discriminate between valuable objects, packing or rubbish”. It is important to never use rodent bait, because “poisoned rodents often crawl away and die in unreachable areas such as between walls and under furniture, and their carcasses provide food for other pests”. Traps should be used to remove rodents from the museum in a more humane manner that will prevent the rodents from attracting more pests or causing larger problems.

=== Birds ===
Birds can cause damage to the exterior of the museum when they roost or nest on “windowsills, ledger, and other architectural features”. Bird droppings can cause staining and damage to the building and any fabric attached to the building. Museum staff will also need to be careful when they are around birds and items infested by birds as they can “pose a health hazard to humans ... as (they) carry parasites and disease”. Bird droppings can also be tracked into the museum and collection space, and by working to remove the birds from entrances, the tracking of the droppings can be controlled.

=== Bats ===
Bats can cause damage and mess with their droppings.

=== Fungi ===
In the presence of nutrients and under unfavourable climatic conditions such as excessive humidity, moulds can colonize both organic and inorganic surfaces. Moulds and mildew are generally conidial fungi as they grow on the surface of the initiated airborne objects. These conidia typically come with large airborne spores (pollen grain, textile fibres, skin cells, starch, grains, inorganic particles) called airspora, which are available in the air and can settle to an object's surface. Fungi excrete metabolic products (enzymes, glycerol, biofilm, organic acids, and pigments) that could cause damage to their substrates. For instance, objects like ceramics and stones could be corroded or etched by organic acid by-products of fungal germination such as citric, oxalic, succinic, glutamic, fumaric, malic and acetic acids.

The most vulnerable organic materials are paper and parchment, which are common carriers of valuable information. Moulds and mildew feed on them because they are cellulosic, proteinaceous, and include fatty components. They are relatively soft, entirely digested, and cellularly permeable. Furthermore, the resulting damage is disfiguring due to these qualities. Fungal activity on the paper, for example, or their contact with the substrate, results in discolouration known as fox spots. These could be colored conidia or other fungal components entangled in the paper fibers, such as hyphae and sclerotia.

== Common museum pests ==
Common name	Latin Name
American cockroach	Periplaneta americana
Australian Spider Beetle	Ptinus tectus
Black carpet beetle	Attagenus unicolor
Black larder beetle	Dermestes ater
Black rat	Rattus rattus
Book lice	Order Psocoptera
Brown-banded cockroach	Supella longipalpa
Brown house moth	Hofmannophila pseudospretella
Brown marmorated stink bug	Halyomorpha halys
Brown rat	Rattus norvegicus
Case-bearing clothes moth	Tinea pellionella
Cigarette beetle	Lasioderma serricorne
Common furniture beetle	Anobium punctatum
Deathwatch beetle	Xestobium rufovillosum
Drugstore beetle	Stegobium paniceum
Firebrat	Thermobia domestica
Furniture carpet beetle	Anthrenus flavipes
German cockroach	Blattella germanica
Harlequin ladybird	Harmonia axyridis
Hide beetle	Dermestes maculatus
House mouse	Mus domesticus
House sparrow	Passer domesticus
Larder beetle	Dermestes lardarius
Minute brown scavenger beetles	Family Latridiidae
Odd beetle	Thylodrias contractus
Old-house borer	Hylotrupes bajulus
Oriental cockroach	Blatta orientalis
Pigeon	Columba livia
Powderpost beetles	Subfamily Lyctinae
Silverfish	Lepisma saccharina
Springtails	Order Collembola
Varied carpet beetle	Anthrenus verbasci
Vodka beetle	Attagenus smirnovi
Voles	Microtus spp.
Warehouse beetle	Trogoderma variabile
Webbing clothes moth	Tineola bisselliella
Western conifer seed bug	Leptoglossus occidentalis
White-shouldered house moth	Endrosis sarcitrella
Woodlouse spider	Dysdera crocata

== Dirty dozen ==
The "Dirty Dozen" are the top offenders within a museum and an IPM program must take all of these pests into account.

The Dirty Dozen of Museum Pests
Common name	Latin Name	Description
Black Carpet Beetle	Attagenus unicolor	Attagenus unicolor The black carpet beetle is similar to the common carpet beetle. This type of beetle attacks animal products like, feathers, furs, leather, silk, bone and hides and is known to hide along furniture.
Book Lice or Psocids	Liposcelis sp.	Psocoptera Psocids or book lice infest object that are damp and/or moldy. The book lice feeds on the mold that can be found on “dried plants, insect collections, manuscripts, cardboard boxes”, and the paper and starchy glues found in books.
Casemaking Clothes Moth	Tinea pellionella (Linnaeus)	Tinea.pellionella.mounted The Casemaking Clothes Moth has blurred dark spots on their wings. These moths avoid light as they prefer dark areas, such as storage rooms and closets, and "tend to live in corners or in folds of fabric”. Casemaking Clothes Moths are known to eat stored wool, hair, fur, silk, felt, and feathers.
Cigarette beetle	Lasioderma serricorne (Fabricius)	Drugstore beetle 03 The cigarette beetle is a stored product pest and gets its name from the tobacco it can be found living within. The beetles are attracted to dried plants and books in the collection.
Drugstore Beetle	Stegobium paniceum (Linnaeus)	Stegobium paniceum bl The drugstore beetle feeds on books and paper products within the museum collection, including a variety of foods and spices.
Furniture Beetle	Anobium punctatum (DeGeer)	Anobium.punctatum The Furniture beetle are similar to the common carpet beetle and the two can be easily mistaken for one another. These beetles eat a number of common materials found in a museum, including tortoise shell, fur, feathers, silk, horns, wool and furniture.
German Cockroach	Blattella germanica (Linnaeus)	German cockroach The German cockroach can cause damage to objects in a museum's collection by “spitting brown fluid called attar…(this) … can get stuck on artifacts and is very bad to get out”. It is important to identify if your infestation includes young cockroaches as this means you have an infestation and nesting. If these pests have wings and legs this could be a sign that you also have mice. If this is the case, you should not use rodent bait to deal with the mice, as cockroaches are attracted to the rodent bait; it “is loaded with anti-coagulants, a blood thinner which have no effect on insects …(and) … will only aggravate the roach situation”.
Larder Beetle	Dermestes lardarius (Linnaeus)	Klannebille topp The larder beetle are winged insects with coarse yellow hairs and usually have dark spots along their back. These beetles are known to lay eggs on other dead insects, then the larvae eats the dead insects. Larder Beetles are known to damage the furs, hides, and feather objects in the museum's collection.
Silverfish	Lepisma saccharina (Linnaeus)	Silverfish are nocturnal insects that enjoy “cool and moist conditions”. These insects feed on the starch from paper and wallpaper, as well as feed on dead insect parts. The silverfish eats around the ink of the paper it damages and may prevent conservation from easily taking place.
Varied Carpet Beetle	Anthrenus verbasci (Linnaeus)	Anthrenus verbasci The various carpet beetles are active scavengers. These beetles damage carpets, animal products such as feathers, furs, leather, silk, bone, and hides. The carpet beetle is known to live along baseboards and behind furniture.
Warehouse Beetle	Trogoderma variabile (Ballion)	Trogoderma variabile The warehouse beetle is lively and grows at a rapid rate. These beetles can be found in stored food and are attracted to plants and insect collections in a museum. The beetle can be found in the dark, storage areas or in cracks in the building.
Webbing Clothes Moth	Tineola bisselliella (Hummel)	MiteTineola 1233096 The Webbing Clothes Moth are considered to be the “biggest problem in museums across the world … primarily because of pigeons”. The moths feed on feather, wool, hair, fur, and animal protein. The feathers from pigeons, and their nests on the roof of a museum, can attract the moths. A single female moth can lay hundreds of eggs and quickly become an infestation.

== Pest prevention ==
There are a number of steps that a museum can put in place to help to prevent pests within their buildings. It is important to inspect any item that is coming in the storage area such as a new accessions or loans. Museums should maintain good housekeeping and restrict food in the museum to help prevent pests in the first place. It is important for the museum to keep the environments in exhibition galleries and the collection storage areas stable with low, controlled humidity and temperature.

A museum may also install sweeps and gaskets on exterior doors, screens on all drains and windows, while also caulking all cracks in the building. Museums can make their facilities less attractive to pest by removing any plants growing near the building, cleaning the gutters, using sodium vapor lighting, minimizing dust, vacuuming the floors, and eliminating clutter.

=== Routes of entry ===
Pest will always find a way into your building, so it is important to determine how pests are entering your building. The location of the building should be taken into account as every "building has their own ecosystem based on their location and other historic factors". It is important to secure the exterior of the building. It does not matter how many pests you trap and kill; if there is a way for more to enter your building you will never completely remove all pests from the building. All of the cracks and holes in the foundation should be sealed and repaired. All exterior trash receptacles should be placed away from the building, and plants should be at least a foot away from the building. Having grass growing against the building gives insects another way into the building and a place to hide and tunnel under the foundation.

- Windows

All windows should be tightly sealed. Weatherstripping can be placed around the windows to insure that the window is tightly sealed.

- Doors

All doors should be checked and confirmed that they are firmly on their hinges and brush sweepers are installed. Brush sweepers are highly effective against pests, especially rodents. Having sticky traps placed around the sides of doors may prevent pests and monitor what types of pests can be entering the museum.

=== Storage condition ===
Collection storage areas are especially at risk from pests as they can be darker, tight spaces that often go undisturbed for long periods of time. If these tight spaces are left undisturbed and unmonitored for months or years at a time, they will provide an atmosphere for pests to nest in high quantities. All collection areas should be fully cleaned at least twice a year with regular inspections once a month.

=== Water sources ===
Insects and other pests are attracted to water and damp areas. Common sources of water within the building are water pipes that can be found running throughout the building for restrooms, kitchens, water fountains, custodial closets, and climate control equipment. Water can also be found standing on the roof or in basement. If there are any unused pipes or drains, they should be screened or sealed off to not house unwanted guests.

=== Lights ===
It is important to reduce the attractiveness of the building to pests, and one of the ways that this can be achieved is through the lighting. A museum should use light shields, curtains, and keep windows closed to minimize the attractiveness of entering the building. Any “lighting affixed to the building should be made with sodium vapor and not mercury” and should have a yellowish tint. Sodium vapor repels insects, and installing these lights outside of the building can help reduce the pests.

=== Housekeeping ===
One of the most important compotes of preventing pests is having good housekeeping skills. The building should be regularly vacuumed, mopped, and dusted, and food debris should be removed. When the museum is vacuumed, the edge tool around the furniture and baseboards should be used as pests tend to hide in these locations. The collection storage area should be kept clean and free of clutter. Every six months the entire collection storage area should be cleaned, and every month a visual inspection should be conducted throughout the space.

=== Temperature and humidity ===
Pests can be controlled and growth even slowed when the humidity and temperature is controlled. Humidity should be kept below a maximum of 50%. In some cases the pest infestation can be directly related to the humidity and temperature within the building. The optimum temperature should around 68 °F.

=== Screens, caulking, and filters ===
Museum can use screens, filters, and caulking to prevent the entry of pests. Screens should be placed over windows and drains. Filters should be used on all of the air vents and replaced on a regular basis. Caulk can be used to seal cracks and holes in the walls, floors, and round pipes.

=== Food sources ===
Pests can find many sources of food within a museum; “pests are normally wild creatures but they are opportunistic and if material is available that resembles their preferred natural food or nesting, they will readily adapt and possibly thrive." Food sources can range from human food, to plants and trash. Human food should be consumed in restricted area and have any food put away quickly after use. Plants can come in many forms, including potted plants, cut flowers, and dying plants. Trash should also be collected and removed from the building daily.

== Pest removal ==
- Heat

Treating an object with heat is a method used to disinfect objects by either an oven or a commercial kiln. When the internal temperature reaches “130°F for three hours it will kill any insect”; however, this kind of heat can damage veneer, damage finish of specimens, warp lumber, or melt glues.

- Freezing

Freezing an object is one of the best ways to disinfect and to destroy pests. This process should be done in a controlled freezer that can reach temperatures below 0 °F. “Books, mammal, ethnographic materials and bird collections have been successfully frozen for insect control,” though freezing is not always the best option for certain objects such as certain woods, bone, lacquers, some painted surfaces, and leather. Before an object is frozen for one to two weeks, it should be wrapped tightly in plastic or in a plastic bag.

- Vacuuming

Vacuuming an infested object can remove pests. It is important to ensure that the “materials are not fragile or deteriorated" if they are to be vacuumed. Vacuuming should remove all of the hatched pest, but some eggs may remain as they can be microscopic. After the object has been vacuumed, it should be placed in a plastic bag isolating the object. During the isolation, the objects should be monitored to make sure that no pests remain on the object, and after the pests life cycle is completed the cleaning process may needed to be repeated.

- Microwave

Microwaving an infested object is still an experimental technique but has been known to “kill cockroach, silverfish, and psocids inside books ... the average infested book is microwaved on high for 20-30 seconds”.
