= Takabuti =

Ancient Egyptian mummy

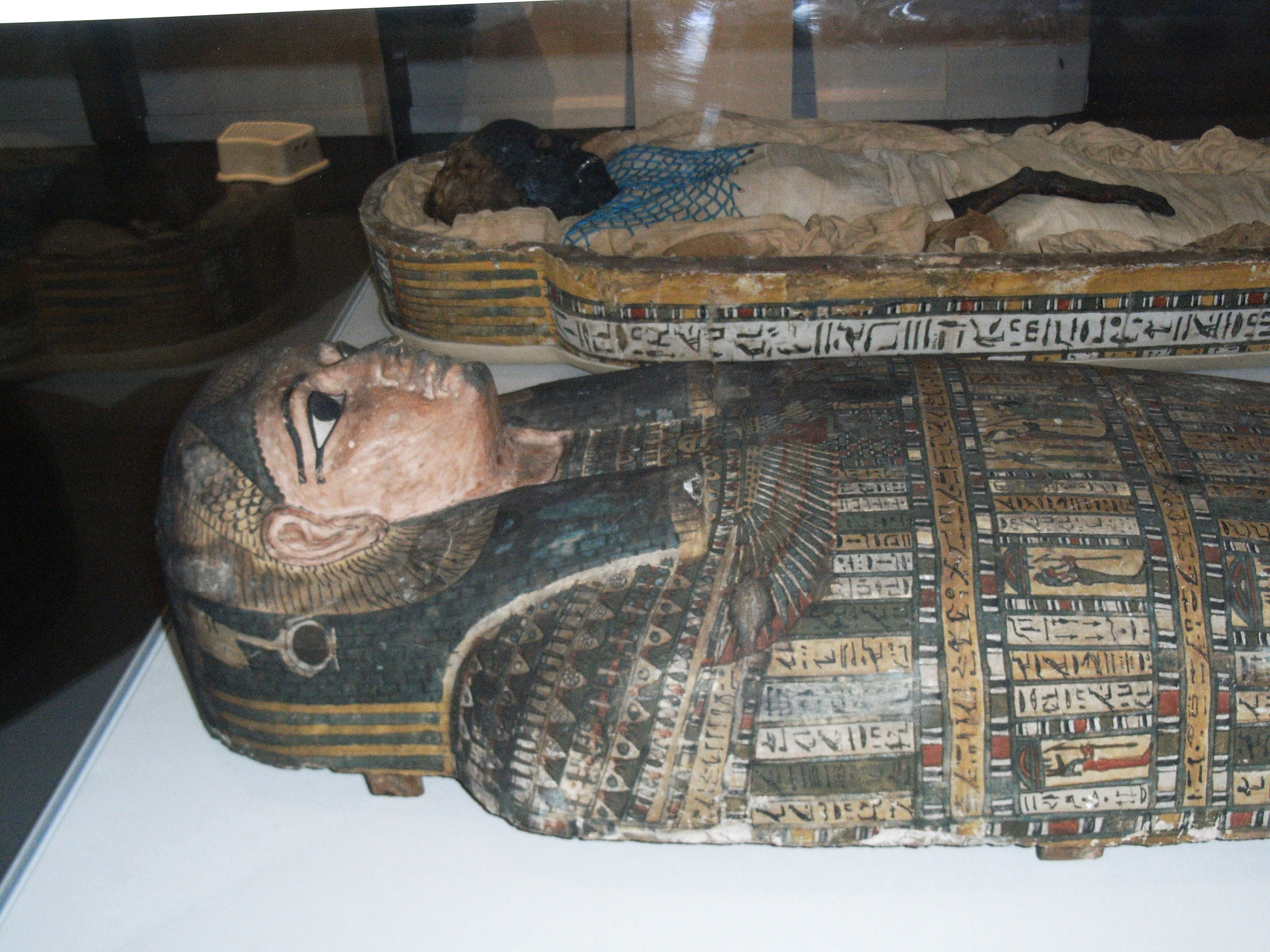
- The mummy and coffin of Takabuti on display in Ulster Museum
- Died: c. 660 BC, 20-30 years old
- Burial place: Thebes
- Parents: Nespare (father); Tasenirit (mother)

Takabuti was an ancient Egyptian married woman who reached an age of between twenty and thirty years. She lived in the Egyptian city of Thebes at the end of the Twenty-fifth Dynasty of Egypt, c. 660 BC. Her mummified body and mummy case are in the Ulster Museum in Belfast, Northern Ireland. Takabuti was the first mummy to be unwrapped in Ireland, in 1835.

The coffin was opened and the mummy unrolled on 27 January 1835 in Belfast Natural History Society's museum at College Square North. Edward Hincks, a leading Egyptologist from Ireland, was present and deciphered the Egyptian hieroglyphs which revealed that she was a noblewoman and the mistress of a great house. Her mother's name was Tasenirit and her father was Nespare, a priest of Amun. She was buried in a cemetery west of Thebes. It was initially suggested that Takabuti was murdered due to knife wounds found on her body.

After the Napoleonic Wars, there was a brisk trade in Egyptian mummies. Takabuti was purchased in 1834 by Thomas Greg of Ballymenoch House, Holywood, County Down. At that time, the unwrapping of a mummy was of considerable scientific interest (as well as curiosity) and later studies revealed beetles later identified as Necrobia mumiarum Hope, 1834, Dermestes maculatus DeGeer, 1774 (as D. vulpinus) and Dermestes frischi Kugelann, 1792 (as D. pollinctus Hope, 1834). The painted coffin was itself of considerable interest and the wrappings of fine linen were given much attention in the town that was the commercial centre of the Irish linen industry. One hundred and seventy years later Takabuti remains a popular attraction for visitors.

In April of 2021, a new book on Takabuti was published, revealing that she had not been killed by a knife, but instead by an axe, probably while she was attempting to escape from her assailant (speculated to either be an Assyrian soldier or one of Takabuti's own people). The wound was found in her upper left shoulder, and was more than likely instantaneously fatal. It was also found that Takabuti's heart had not been removed (as previously thought), and she possessed two very rare mutations: an extra tooth (which appears in 0.02 per cent of the population) and an extra vertebra (which occurs in 2 per cent of the population).

== DNA research ==
In 2020, the University of Manchester's KNH Centre analysed Takabuti's mitochondrial DNA (mtDNA). Takabuti's mtDNA haplogroup was determined to be H4a1, described as "a predominantly European haplogroup", and indicative of "European heritage". In the archaeological record H4a1 has previously been reported in Guanche remains from the Canary Islands (6th-14th century CE), in Bell Beaker and Únětice remains from Germany (c. 2500–1800 BCE), and in an individual from early Bronze Age Bulgaria (c. 2200 BCE). The oldest reported H4a1 samples are from Cardial Neolithic contexts in Spain and Portugal, dating from c. 5300 BC. According to Fregel et al. (2019, 2020), the presence of H4a1 in ancient samples from the Canary Islands corresponds with "Eurasian prehistoric intrusions in North Africa", whilst the frequency of H4a1 in Bronze Age Europe further supports the idea of migrations in North Africa after the Neolithic period. Both European Neolithic Farmer and Central European Bell Beaker ancestry have been identified in Guanche remains from the Canary Islands. The H4a1 variant possessed by Takabuti is relatively rare in modern populations, with a modern distribution including ~ 2% of a southern Iberian population, ~ 1% in a Lebanese population and ~ 1.5% of multiple Canary Island populations.

Analysis of Takabuti's well-preserved hair found that it was naturally auburn in colour.

== See also ==
- Genetic history of Egypt
