= Dermestes matthewsi =

Scientific classification
- Kingdom: Animalia
- Phylum: Arthropoda
- Clade: Pancrustacea
- Class: Insecta
- Order: Coleoptera
- Suborder: Polyphaga
- Family: Dermestidae
- Genus: Dermestes
- Subgenus: Derbyana; Lawrence & Ślipiński, 2005
- Species: D. matthewsi

Binomial name
- Dermestes matthewsi Lawrence & Slipinski, 2005

Synonyms
- Derbyana matthewsi

Species of beetle

The species Dermestes (Derbyana) matthewsi, also called Derbyana matthewsi or Dermestes matthewsi, is a species of beetle in the family Dermestidae.

It is currently the only species in the subgenus Derbyana. Formally, the species was the only species of the genus Derbyana and it was considered a very distinctive and presumably native genus to Australia. However, after a study to the molecular phylogeny of the Dermestidae family, it was revealed that the taxonomic placement of Derbyana matthewsi was nested in the Dermestes genus. Both Dermestes ater and Dermestes lardarius are species from the Dermestes s. str. subgenus. The species D. matthewsi is closer related to Dermestes ater than Dermestes lardarius is to Dermestes ater. After this revelation, the status of Derbyana was changed to subgenus rank.

The species is found in northern Western Australia. This includes Central Kimberley, Dampierland, Northern Kimberley, Ord Victoria Plain and Victoria Bonaparte.
