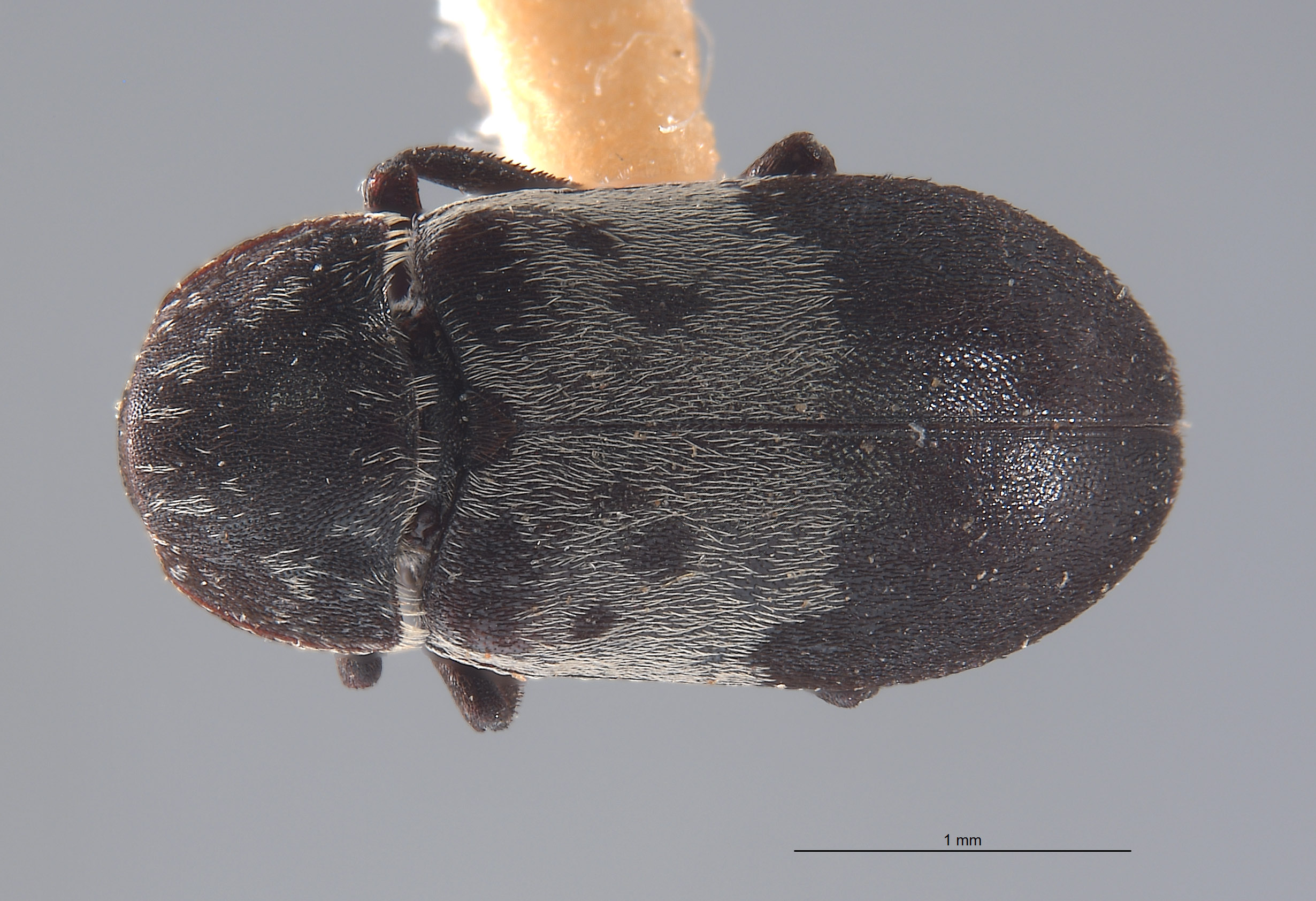
- Dorsal image
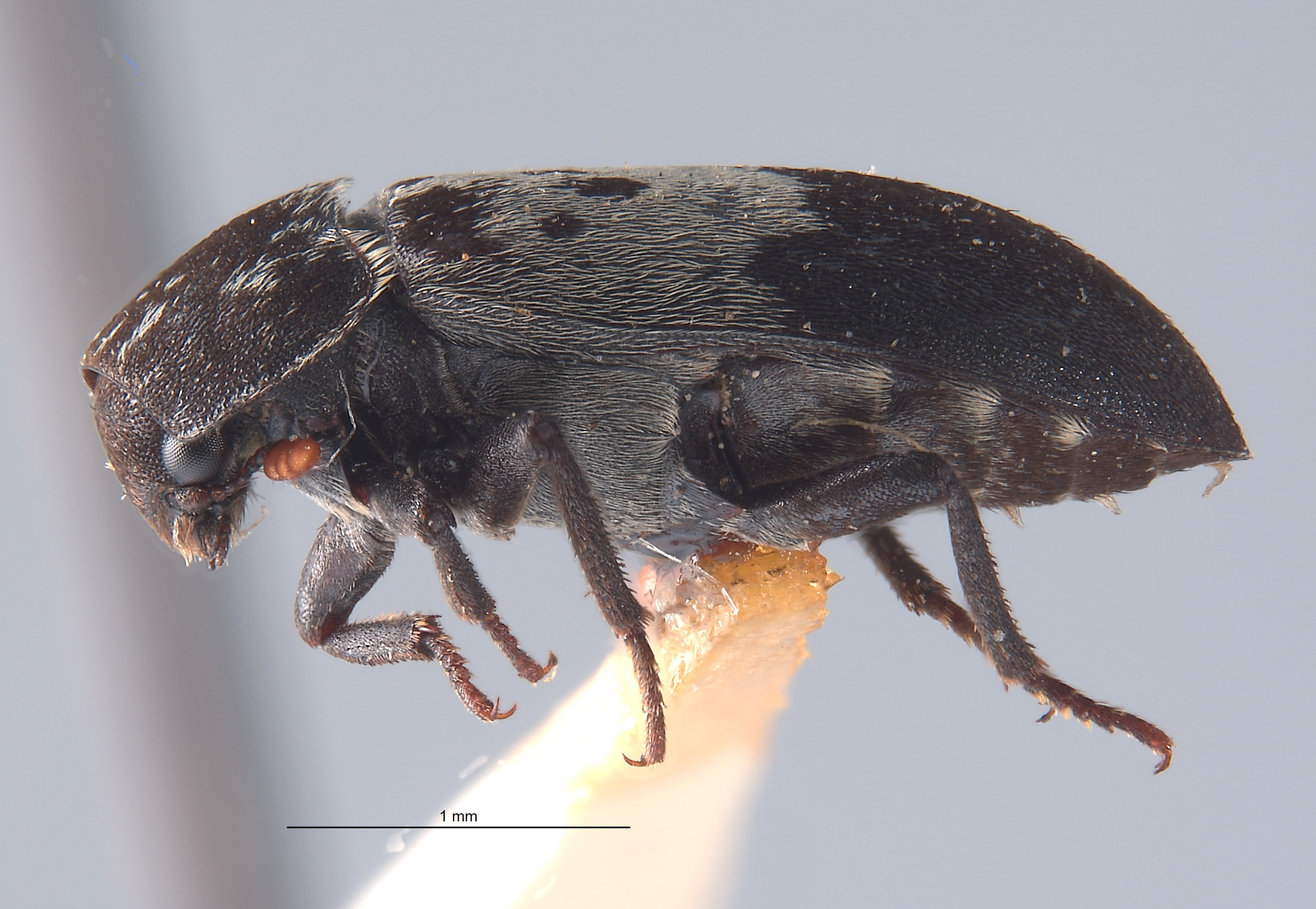
- Lateral image

Scientific classification
- Domain: Eukaryota
- Kingdom: Animalia
- Phylum: Arthropoda
- Class: Insecta
- Order: Coleoptera
- Suborder: Polyphaga
- Family: Dermestidae
- Genus: Dermestes
- Species: D. reductus

Binomial name
- Dermestes reductus Kalík, 1952

= Dermestes reductus =

Species of beetle

Dermestes reductus is a species of dermestid beetle found in North America. The appearance of the beetle closely resembles a more common larder beetle (Dermestes lardarius) and belongs to the same species group.

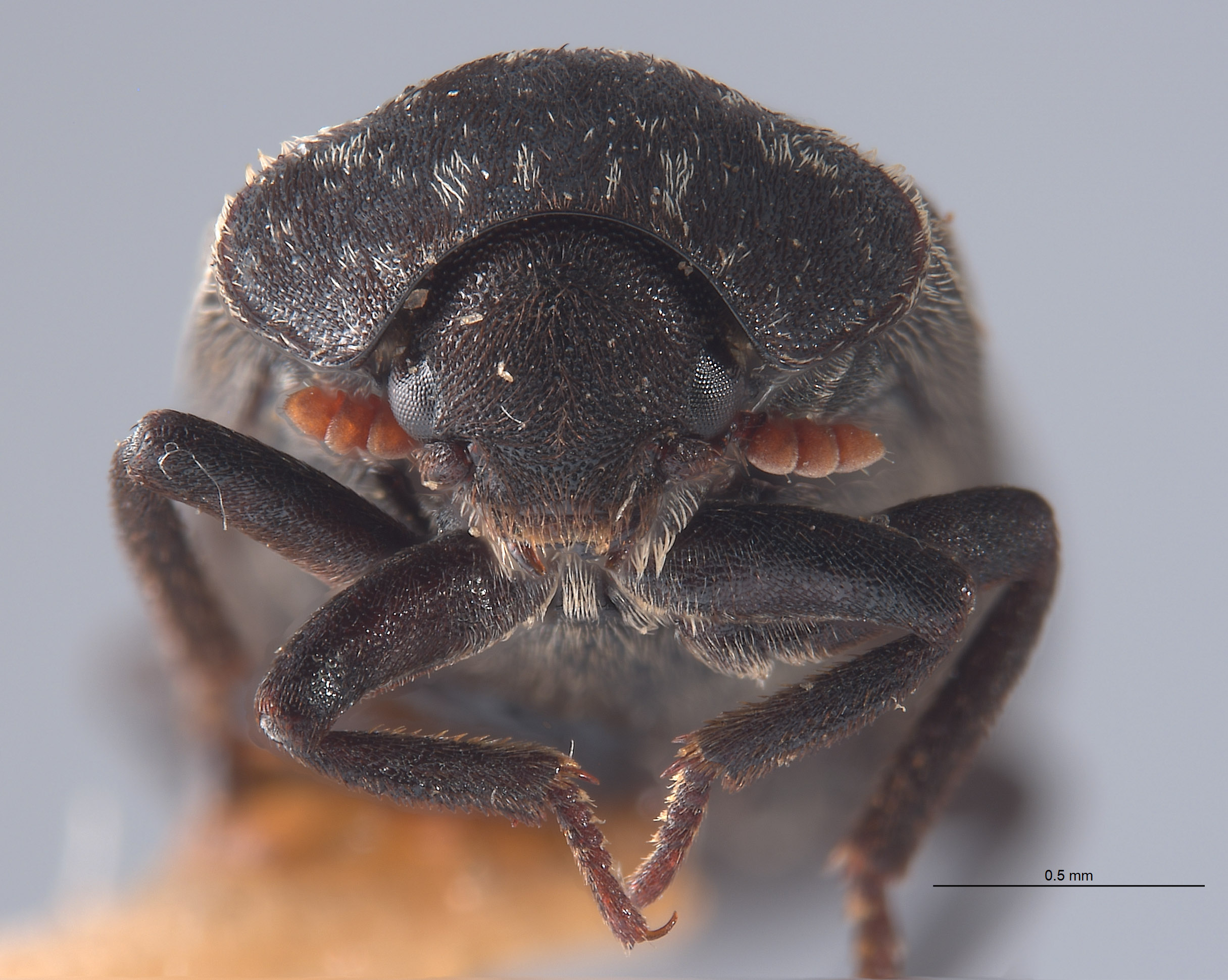
Dermestes reductus. Head view

== Key characteristics ==
Dermestes reductus can be distinguished from Dermestes lardarius using the following visual characteristics:

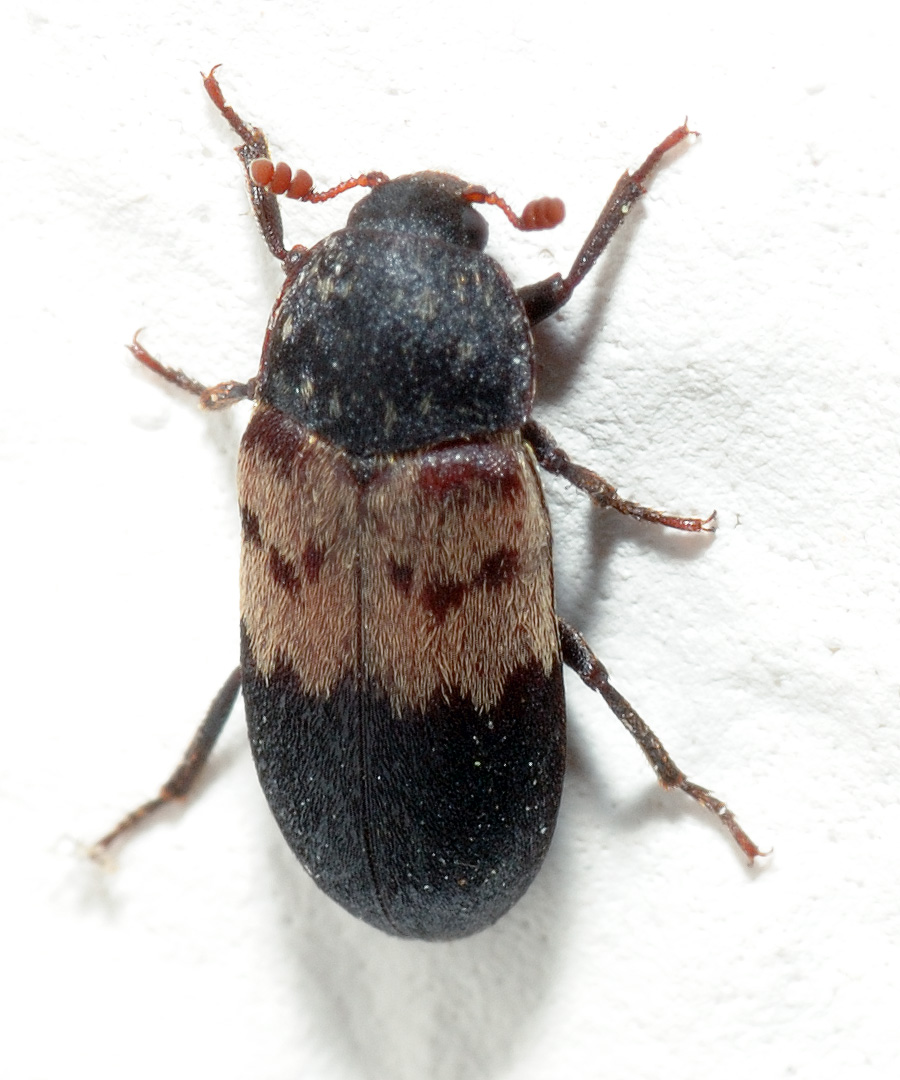
Dermestes lardarius

Individuals are smaller (6-6.5 mm long compared to 7–8.5 mm in D. lardarius, although specimens of D. lardarius ranging from 6 to 9 mm long have been found); the light patch on basal 2/5 of the elytra of D. reductus is made of grey hair (while it is made of light yellow/light brown hair in D. lardarius); except for the light elytral patch, the adult is all black (in D. lardarius, the area posterior to the light elytral patch is said to be red to brown, but perhaps this is rather the case for individuals dead for a while); the sides of the elytra are relatively more parallel, the lateral margins of the prothorax less raised, and the body flatter than D. lardarius; the aedeagus of males is narrow in the middle (in D. lardarius it is relatively the same width throughout). Dermestes reductus is found in wooded areas, typically under tree bark, and never in associations with humans dwellings or activities, unlike D. lardarius which is commonly found in man made buildings.

== See also ==
Other species from species group "lardarius":

- Dermestes lardarius (cosmopolitan)
- Dermestes signatus (North America)
- Dermestes vorax (Asia)
