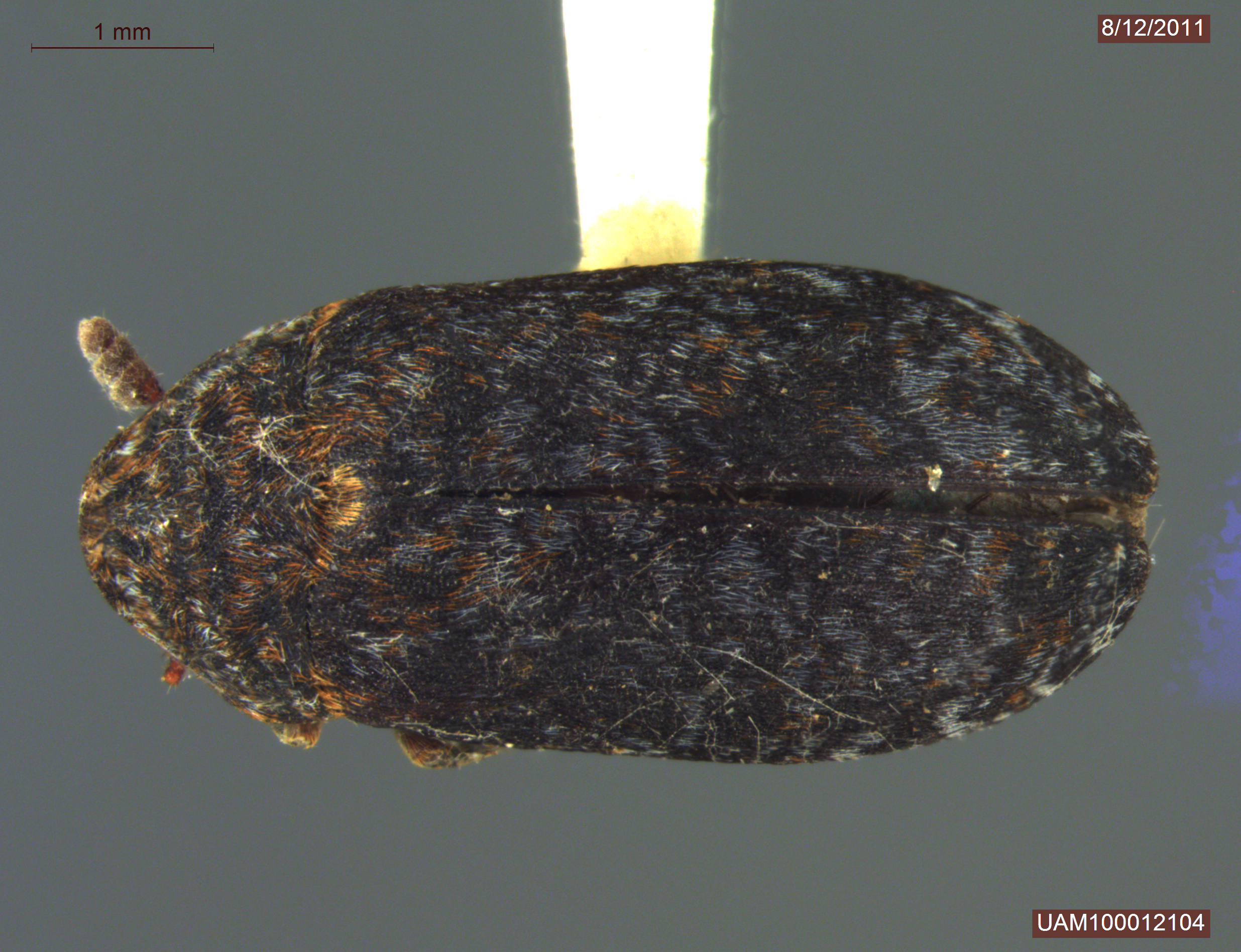

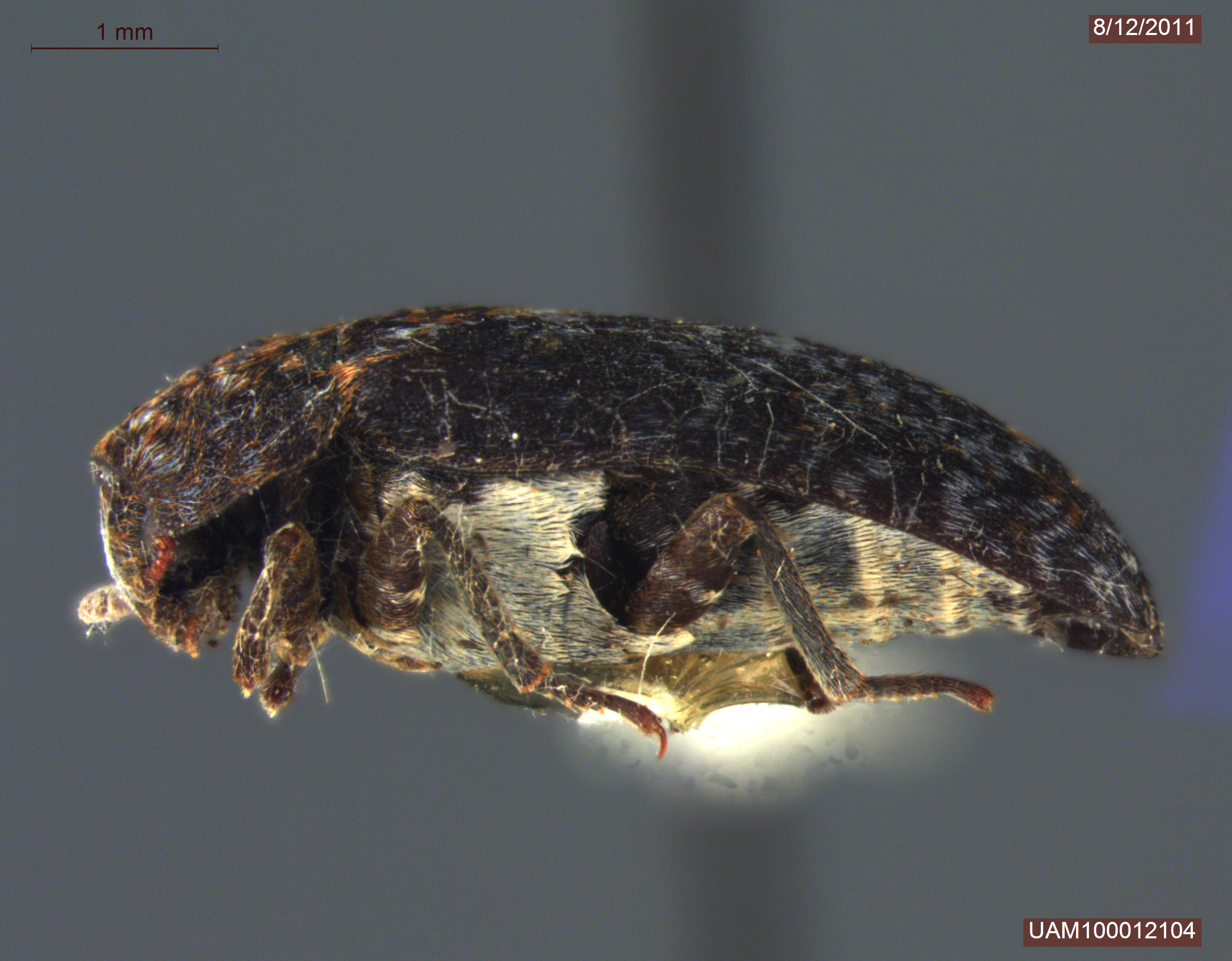

Scientific classification
- Domain: Eukaryota
- Kingdom: Animalia
- Phylum: Arthropoda
- Class: Insecta
- Order: Coleoptera
- Suborder: Polyphaga
- Family: Dermestidae
- Genus: Dermestes
- Species: D. talpinus

Binomial name
- Dermestes talpinus Mannerheim, 1843

= Dermestes talpinus =

Species of beetle

Dermestes talpinus, the hide and tallow dermestid, is a species of carpet beetle in the family Dermestidae. It is found in North America.
