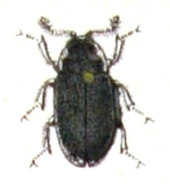

Scientific classification
- Kingdom: Animalia
- Phylum: Arthropoda
- Clade: Pancrustacea
- Class: Insecta
- Order: Coleoptera
- Suborder: Polyphaga
- Family: Dermestidae
- Genus: Dermestes
- Species: D. frischii

Binomial name
- Dermestes frischii Kugelann, 1792

Synonyms
- Dermestes frischi; Dermestes pollinctus Hope, 1834

= Dermestes frischii =

Species of beetle

Dermestes frischii is a species of beetle found in the Palearctic, including Europe, tropical Africa, the Near East, the Nearctic, North Africa and East Asia. In Europe, it is known from Albania, Bosnia and Herzegovina, Bulgaria, Corsica, Croatia, the Czech Republic, mainland Denmark, European Turkey, Finland, mainland France, Germany, mainland Greece, Hungary, mainland Italy, Kaliningrad, Moldova, North Macedonia, mainland Norway (doubtful), Poland, Russia, Sardinia, Sicily, Slovakia, mainland Spain, Sweden, Ukraine and Yugoslavia.

The species was described by German entomologist Johann Gottlieb Kugelann in 1792.

== Description ==
Adults of D. frischii are 6–9.5 mm long, black/dark brown in colour and oval in shape. The sides of the pronotum are covered in yellowish-white hairs. The antennae are 11-segmented with the last 3 segments forming a club. The sexes can be distinguished by the presence (males) or absence (females) of a tuft of black-brown hairs in the middle of the fourth abdominal sternite.

Larvae are 13–15 mm long when mature, and are dark with a pale band along the dorsal surface of the body. They are covered in reddish-brown hairs of varying lengths. On the ninth abdominal segment is a pair of horn-like protrusions (urogomphi) which curve anteriorly. They are similar to larvae of D. maculatus, but one difference is that the dorsal band is disrupted on the prothorax (not disrupted in D. maculatus).

== Life cycle ==
Adult females begin egg-laying in spring and may lay 40 to over 400 eggs during a 2-month period. Eggs are laid on materials of animal origin (carrion, dried meat, dried fish etc.) that will be used as food. Larvae hatch 5–9 days later and begin feeding and growing. There are 5-9 larval instars.

Eventually the larvae stop feeding and seek shelter inside the material to pupate. The pupa stage lasts for approximately 10 days, after which adults emerge.

The rate of development is mainly affected by temperature. Dermestes frischii develops faster and with fewer instars at 26 °C compared to 23 °C.

== Importance to humans ==
Dermestes frischii is a pest that feeds on various animal products such as dried meat, dried fish, cheese, fur and leather. It can also damage non-food materials such as wood, cork and plaster, as it bores through these materials while searching for pupation sites.

This species is used in forensic entomology to estimate the post-mortem interval (the time that a human corpse has been dead for). Dermestes frischii may colonise corpses either alone or with another Dermestes species such as D. undulatus. These beetles are useful for corpses in hot and dry conditions, as such conditions are favourable for them but unfavourable for fly larvae.
