= Dermestes caninus =

Scientific classification
- Domain: Eukaryota
- Kingdom: Animalia
- Phylum: Arthropoda
- Class: Insecta
- Order: Coleoptera
- Suborder: Polyphaga
- Family: Dermestidae
- Genus: Dermestes
- Species: D. caninus

Binomial name
- Dermestes caninus Germar, 1824

Synonyms
- Dermestes mormonalis Casey, 1924

Species of beetle

Dermestes caninus is a species of carpet beetle in the family Dermestidae. It is found in North America and Oceania.

== Subspecies ==
These three subspecies belong to the species Dermestes caninus:

- Dermestes caninus caninus Germar, 1824
- Dermestes caninus compactus Casey
- Dermestes caninus nubipennis Casey
