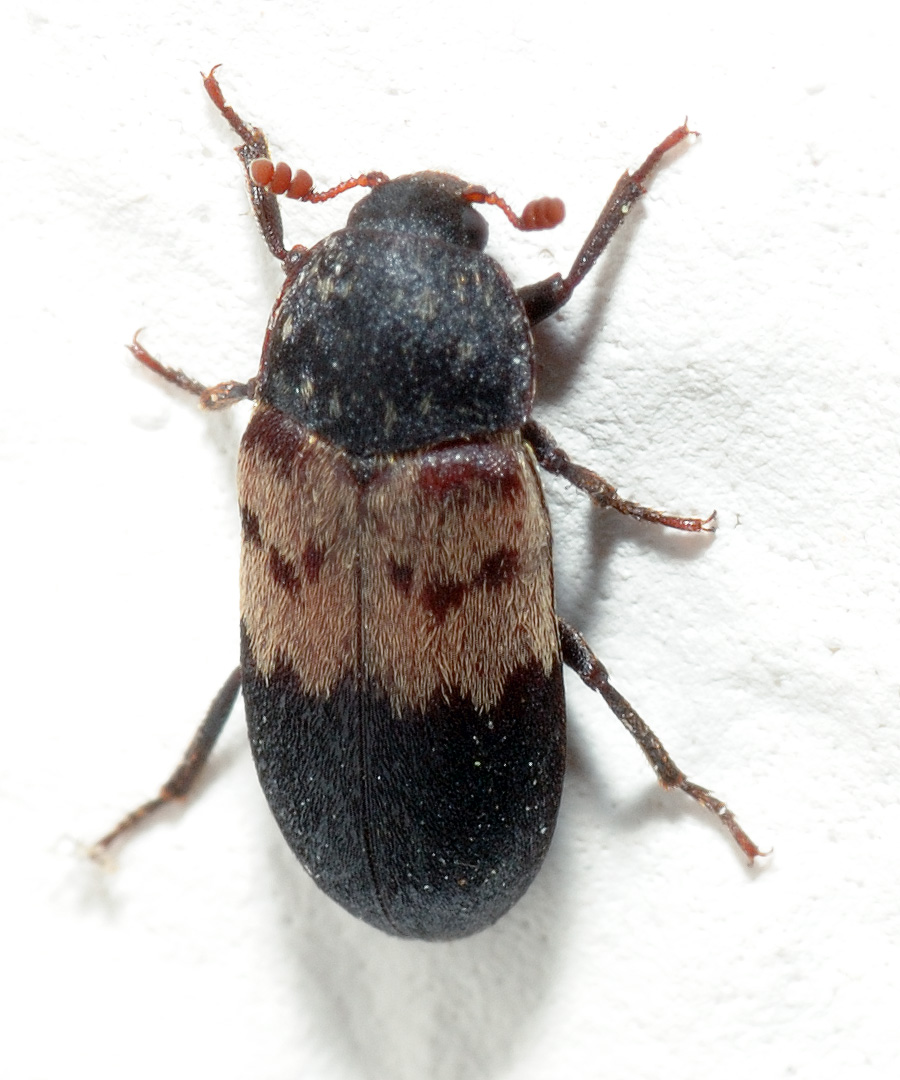
- D. lardarius

Scientific classification
- Kingdom: Animalia
- Phylum: Arthropoda
- Clade: Pancrustacea
- Class: Insecta
- Order: Coleoptera
- Suborder: Polyphaga
- Family: Dermestidae
- Subfamily: Dermestinae
- Tribe: Dermestini
- Genus: Dermestes; Linnaeus, 1758

Type species
- Dermestes lardarius Linnaeus, 1758

= Dermestes =

Dermestes Temporal range: Paleogene–present

Genus of beetles

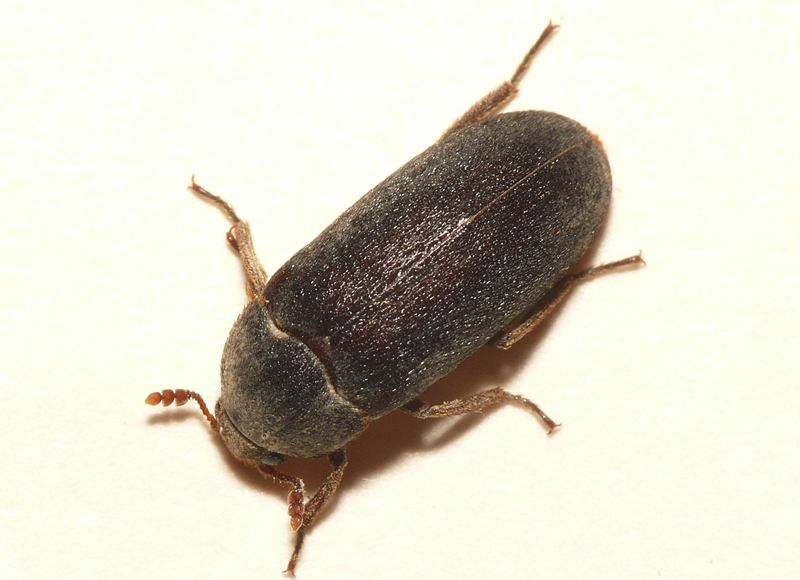
Dermestes haemorrhoidalis

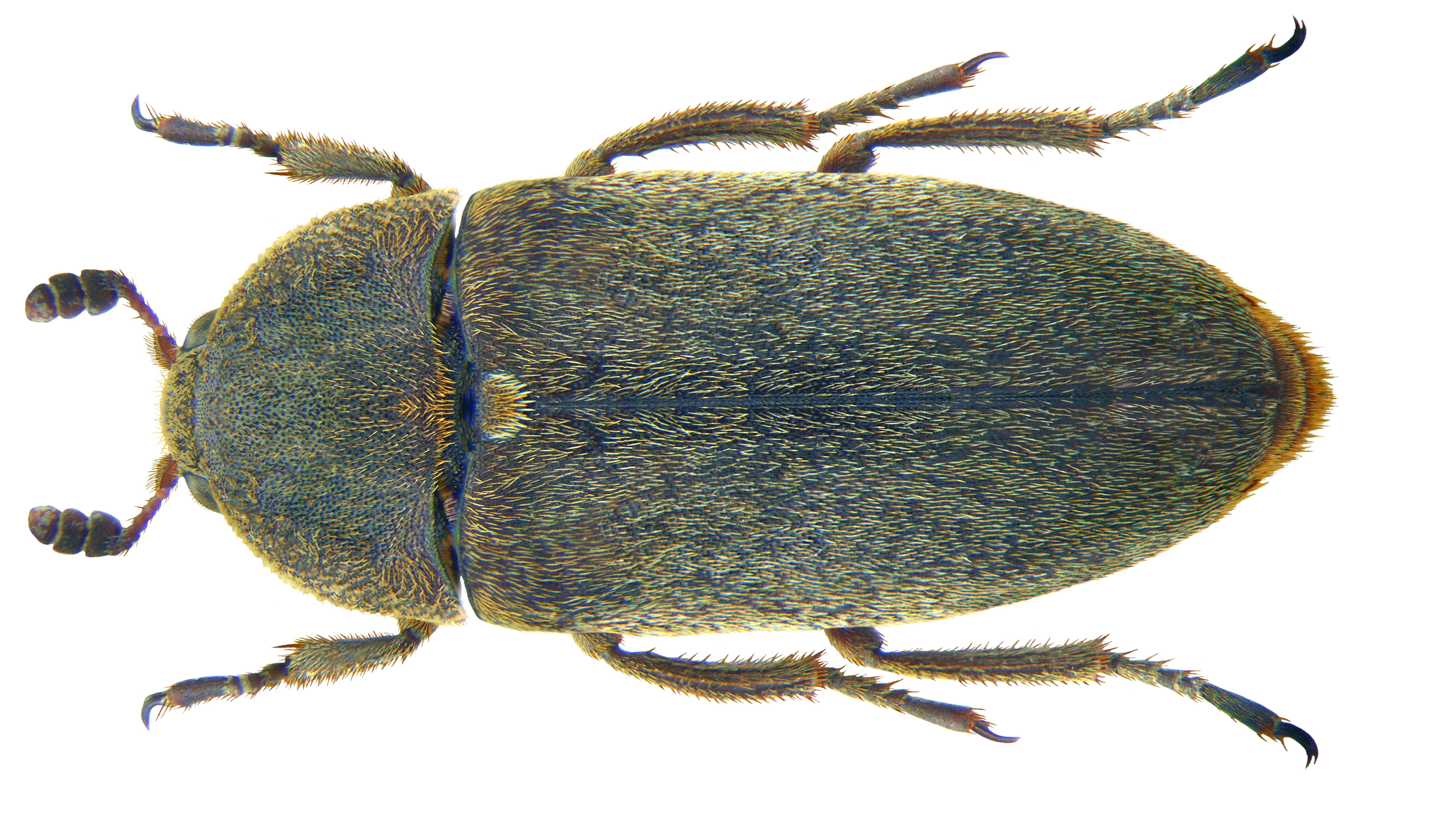
Dermestes maculatus

Dermestes is a genus of beetles in the family Dermestidae, the skin beetles. The genus is distributed worldwide.

The larvae of these beetles feed on dead and dried animal material, including dead bodies, dried meat and fish, and body parts such as bone, hair, skin, and feathers. They are cannibalistic on occasion. They are pests of museums, where they feed on specimens such as dried insects and stuffed animals. They may be useful in museum settings as well, where they are used in facilities called dermestaria to clean tissue from skeletons. Some species may play a role in forensic entomology when they are found on human corpses.

As of 2013, there are about 92 species.

== Species ==
- Dermestes affinis Sturm, 1843
- Dermestes argentinus Herrmann & Háva, 2013
- Dermestes ater DeGeer, 1774
- Dermestes aurichalceus Küster, 1846
- Dermestes avidus Christofori & Jan, 1832
- Dermestes bicolor Fabricius, 1781
- Dermestes boliviensis Háva & Kalík, 2005
- Dermestes caninus Germar, 1824
- Dermestes canus Sturm, 1843
- Dermestes carnivorus Fabricius, 1775
- Dermestes castaneus Thunberg, 1794
- Dermestes cinereus Dahl, 1823
- Dermestes coarctatus Harold, 1877
- Dermestes coronatus Steven in Schönherr, 1808
- Dermestes depressus Gebler, 1830
- Dermestes destructor Christofori & Jan, 1832
- Dermestes dimidiatus Boeber, 1802
- Dermestes elegans Gebler, 1830
- Dermestes elongatissimus Pic, 1916
- Dermestes elongatus Dejean, 1837
- Dermestes erichsoni Ganglbauer, 1904
- Dermestes fasciatus LeConte, 1854
- Dermestes fasciventris Reitter, 1881
- Dermestes flavicornis Schneider, 1785
- Dermestes floricola Melsheimer, 1806
- Dermestes freudei Kalík & Ohbayashi, 1982
- Dermestes frischii Kugelann, 1792
- Dermestes fuliginosus Rossi, 1792
- Dermestes fulvicollis Reitter, 1881
- Dermestes gerstaeckeri Dalla Torre, 1911
- Dermestes gyllenhalii Laporte, 1840
- Dermestes haemorrhoidalis Küster, 1852
- Dermestes hankae Háva, 1999
- Dermestes hirticollis Fabricius, 1792
- Dermestes hispanicus Kalík, 1952
- Dermestes impressipennis Pic, 1942
- Dermestes insulanus Schneider, 1785
- Dermestes intermedius Kalík, 1951
- Dermestes kafkai Háva & Kalík, 1999
- Dermestes kaszabi Kalík, 1950
- Dermestes laniarius Illiger, 1802
- Dermestes laosensis Háva, 2004
- Dermestes lardarius Linnaeus, 1758
- Dermestes larvalis Cockerell, 1917
- Dermestes latissimus Bielz, 1850
- Dermestes lectulalius Goeze, 1777
- Dermestes leechi Kalík, 1952
- Dermestes leopardinus Mulsant & Godart, 1855
- Dermestes linearis Rossi, 1788
- Dermestes loebli Háva, 2002
- Dermestes maculatus DeGeer, 1774
- Dermestes madagascariensis Lepesme, 1939
- Dermestes marmoratus Knoch in Melsheimer, 1806
- Dermestes marocanus Háva, 1999
- Dermestes matthewsi Lawrence & Ślipiński, 2005
- Dermestes maximus Pic, 1915
- Dermestes murinus Linnaeus, 1758
- Dermestes nan Háva, 2002
- Dermestes nebulosus Melsheimer, 1806
- Dermestes nidum Arrow, 1915
- Dermestes niger Melsheimer, 1806
- Dermestes normandi Kalík, 1951
- Dermestes oblongus Sturm, 1843
- Dermestes obscurus Sturm, 1843
- Dermestes olivieri Lepesme, 1939
- Dermestes palmi Sjöberg, 1950
- Dermestes pardalis Billberg in Schönherr, 1808
- Dermestes patagoniensis Háva & Kalík, 2005
- Dermestes pauper Heer, 1847
- Dermestes persimilis Crotch, 1873
- Dermestes peruvianus Laporte, 1840
- Dermestes planus Mroczkowski, 1960
- Dermestes progenior Zhantiev, 2006
- Dermestes pulcher LeConte, 1854
- Dermestes rapax Christofori & Jan, 1832
- Dermestes rattus LeConte, 1854
- Dermestes reductus Kalík, 1952
- Dermestes roubali (Kalík, 1951)
- Dermestes ruficornis Sturm, 1843
- Dermestes rufofuscus Solier, 1849
- Dermestes sardous Küster, 1846
- Dermestes schneideri Háva, 2002
- Dermestes semistriatus Boheman, 1851
- Dermestes serraticornis Thunberg, 1787
- Dermestes shaanxiensis Cao, 1987
- Dermestes sibiricus Erichson, 1848
- Dermestes sichuanicus Háva, 1999
- Dermestes signatus LeConte, 1874
- Dermestes solskyi Dalla Torre, 1911
- Dermestes spadiceus elsheimer, 1806
- Dermestes spinipennis Christofori & Jan, 1832
- Dermestes sturmi Christofori & Jan, 1832
- Dermestes subaenescens Pic, 1943
- Dermestes szekessyi Kalík, 1950
- Dermestes talpinus Mannerheim, 1843
- Dermestes teretiusculus Schneider, 1785
- Dermestes tertiarius Wickham, 1912
- Dermestes tessellatocollis Motschulsky, 1860
- Dermestes undulatus Brahm, 1790
- Dermestes vetustus Zhantiev, 2006
- Dermestes viridanus Melsheimer, 1806
- Dermestes viridis Schneider, 1785
- Dermestes voi Háva, 2000
- Dermestes vorax Motschulsky, 1860
- Dermestes wittei Kalík, 1955
