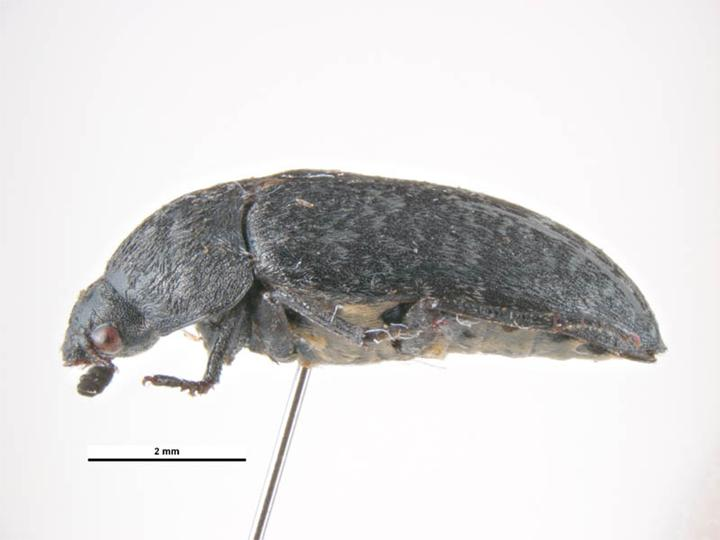
- Dermestes murinus lateral view

Scientific classification
- Kingdom: Animalia
- Phylum: Arthropoda
- Class: Insecta
- Order: Coleoptera
- Suborder: Polyphaga
- Family: Dermestidae
- Genus: Dermestes
- Species: D. murinus

Binomial name
- Dermestes murinus Linnaeus, 1758

= Dermestes murinus =

Species of beetle

Dermestes murinus is a species of beetle in family Dermestidae. It is found in the Palearctic.
