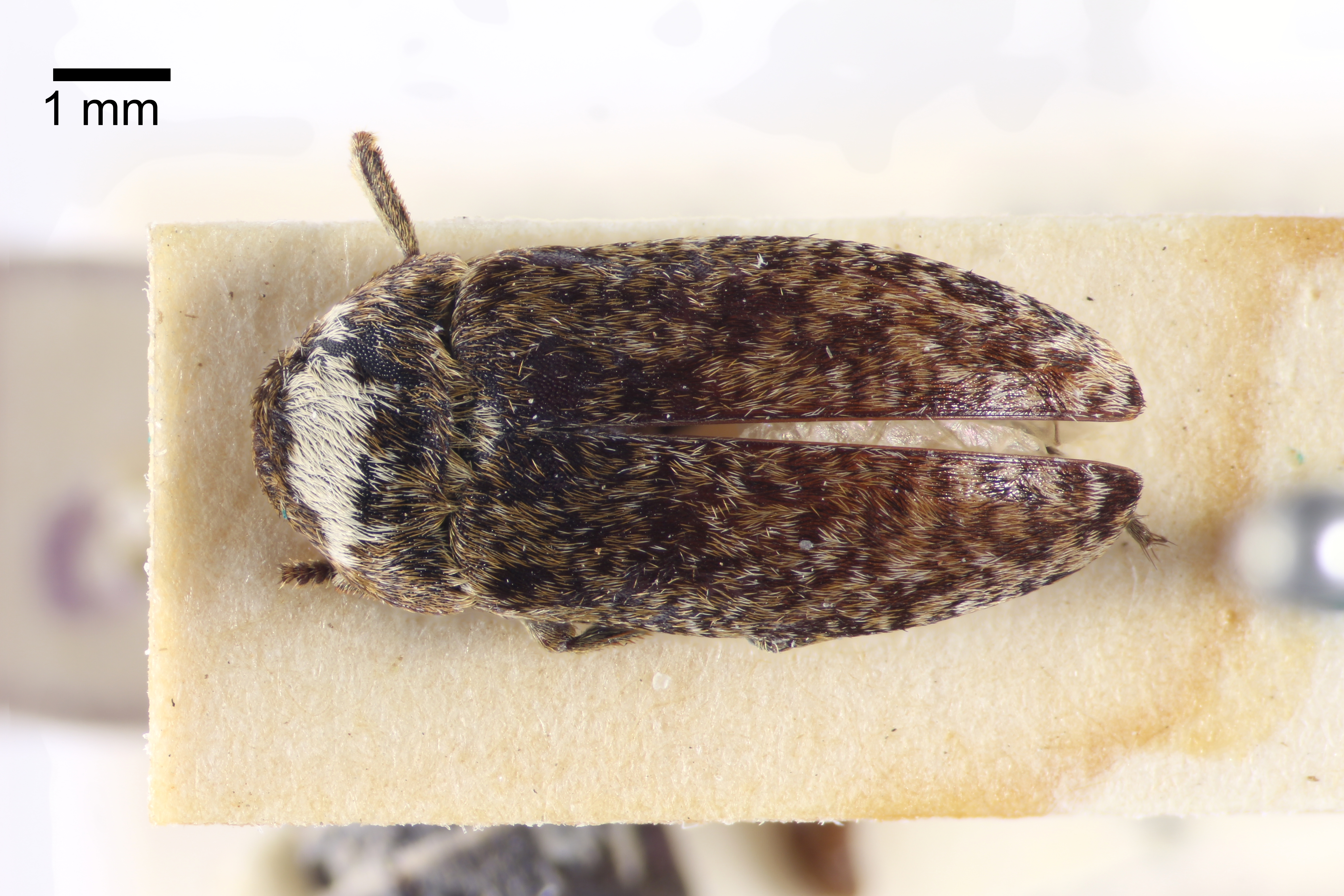

Scientific classification
- Kingdom: Animalia
- Phylum: Arthropoda
- Class: Insecta
- Order: Coleoptera
- Suborder: Polyphaga
- Family: Dermestidae
- Genus: Dermestes
- Subgenus: Dermestinus
- Species: D. coronatus

Binomial name
- Dermestes coronatus Steven in Schönherr, 1808

= Dermestes coronatus =

Species of beetle

Dermestes coronatus is a species of beetle in the subgenus Dermestinus of the genus Dermestes, family Dermestidae. It is known from Turkey, Ukraine, Afghanistan, the Caucasus region, China (Xinjiang), India (Kashmir), Iran, Central Asia, Mongolia, Pakistan, and Russia (Southeast European part, Rostov, Stavropol). It has also been introduced in Poland.
