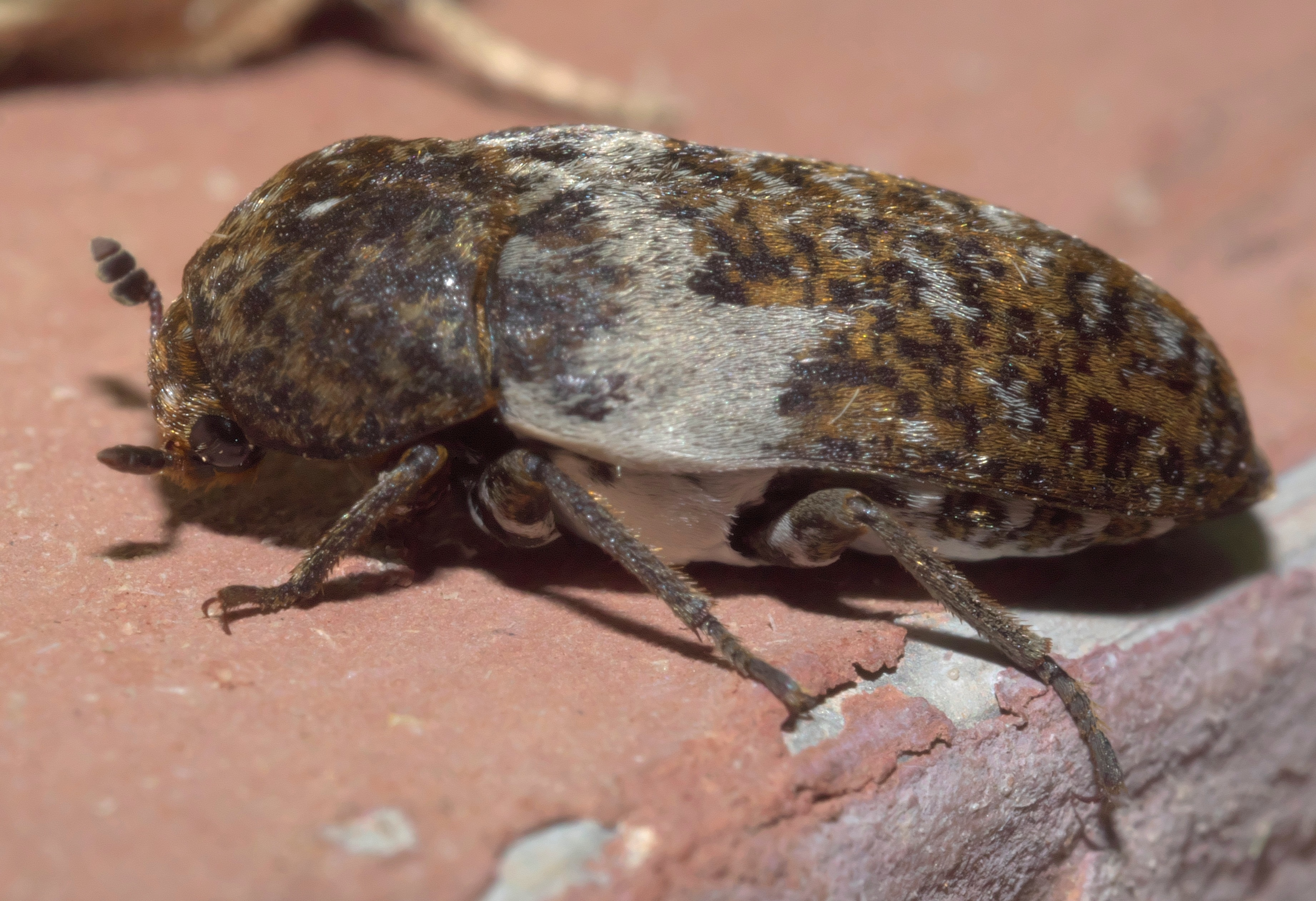
- Dermestes marmoratus, Oklahoma

Scientific classification
- Domain: Eukaryota
- Kingdom: Animalia
- Phylum: Arthropoda
- Class: Insecta
- Order: Coleoptera
- Suborder: Polyphaga
- Family: Dermestidae
- Genus: Dermestes
- Species: D. marmoratus

Binomial name
- Dermestes marmoratus Say, 1823

= Dermestes marmoratus =

Species of beetle

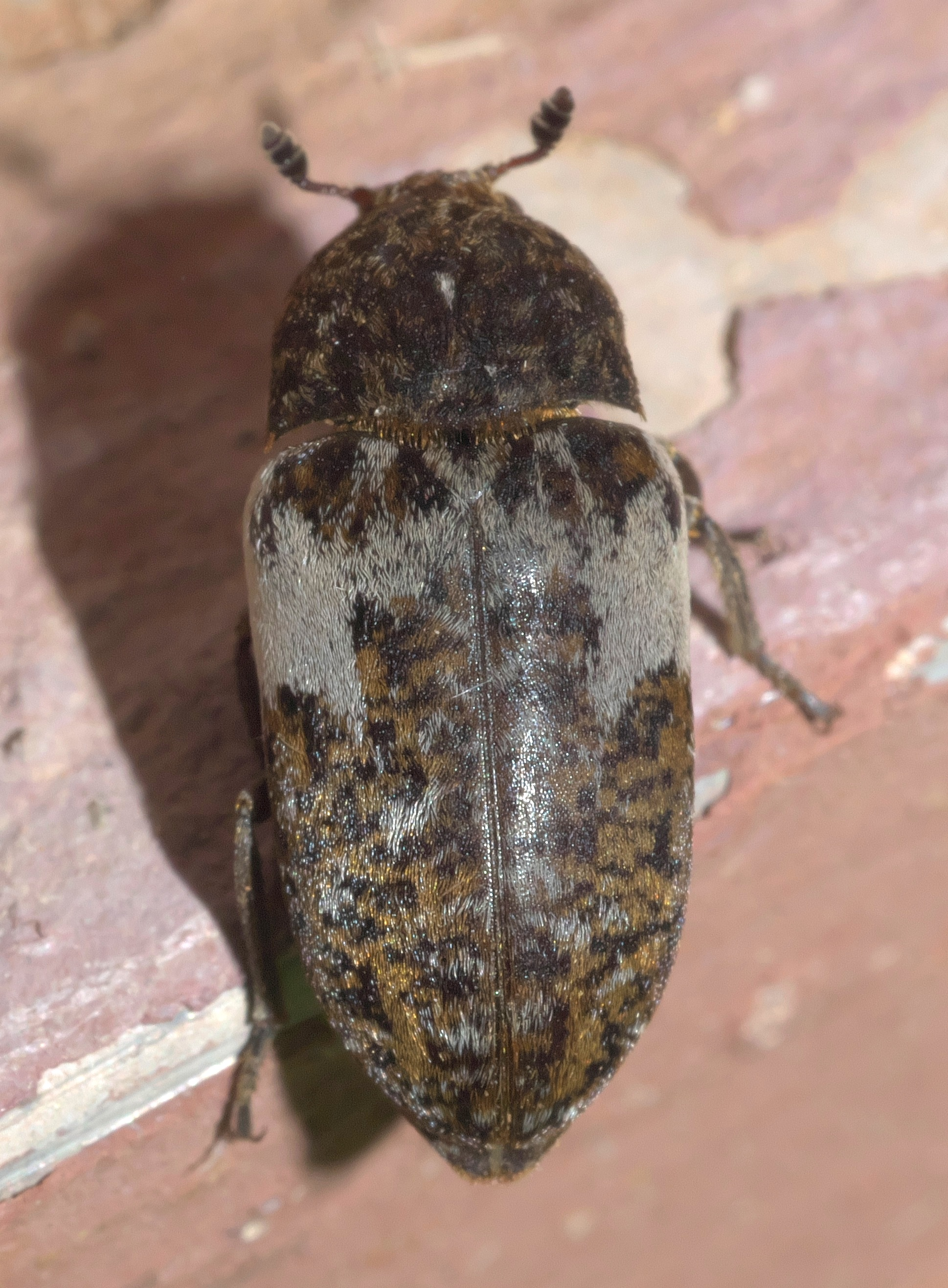
Dermestes marmoratus, Oklahoma

Dermestes marmoratus, the common carrion beetle, is a species of carpet beetle in the family Dermestidae. It is found in North America.
