= Dermestes fasciatus =

Scientific classification
- Domain: Eukaryota
- Kingdom: Animalia
- Phylum: Arthropoda
- Class: Insecta
- Order: Coleoptera
- Suborder: Polyphaga
- Family: Dermestidae
- Genus: Dermestes
- Species: D. fasciatus

Binomial name
- Dermestes fasciatus LeConte, 1854

Species of beetle

Dermestes fasciatus is a species of carpet beetle in the family Dermestidae. It is found in North America.
