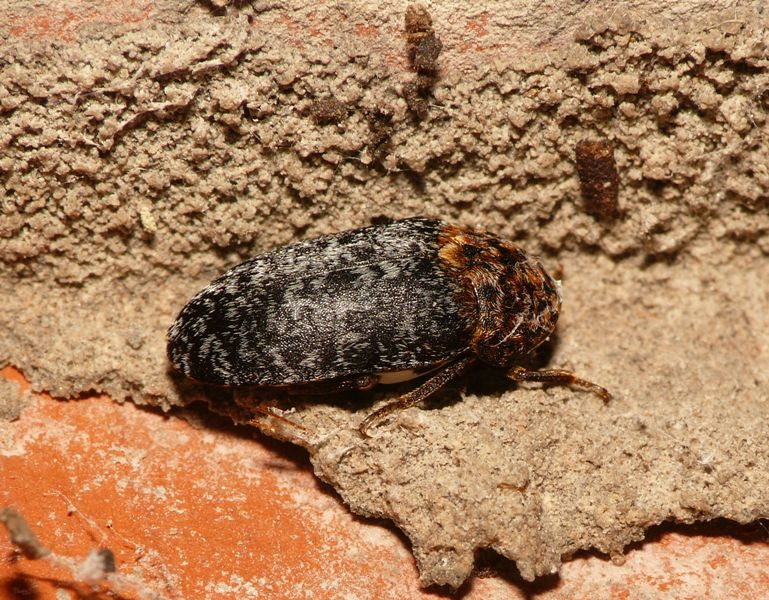

Scientific classification
- Kingdom: Animalia
- Phylum: Arthropoda
- Clade: Pancrustacea
- Class: Insecta
- Order: Coleoptera
- Suborder: Polyphaga
- Family: Dermestidae
- Genus: Dermestes
- Species: D. undulatus

Binomial name
- Dermestes undulatus Brahm, 1790

Synonyms
- Dermestes cylindricus Casey, 1916; Dermestes dissector Kirby, 1837

= Dermestes undulatus =

Species of beetle

Dermestes undulatus is a species of carpet beetle in the family Dermestidae. It is found in North America and Europe.
