= Dermestarium =

Facility used for defleshing bones for long-term preservation

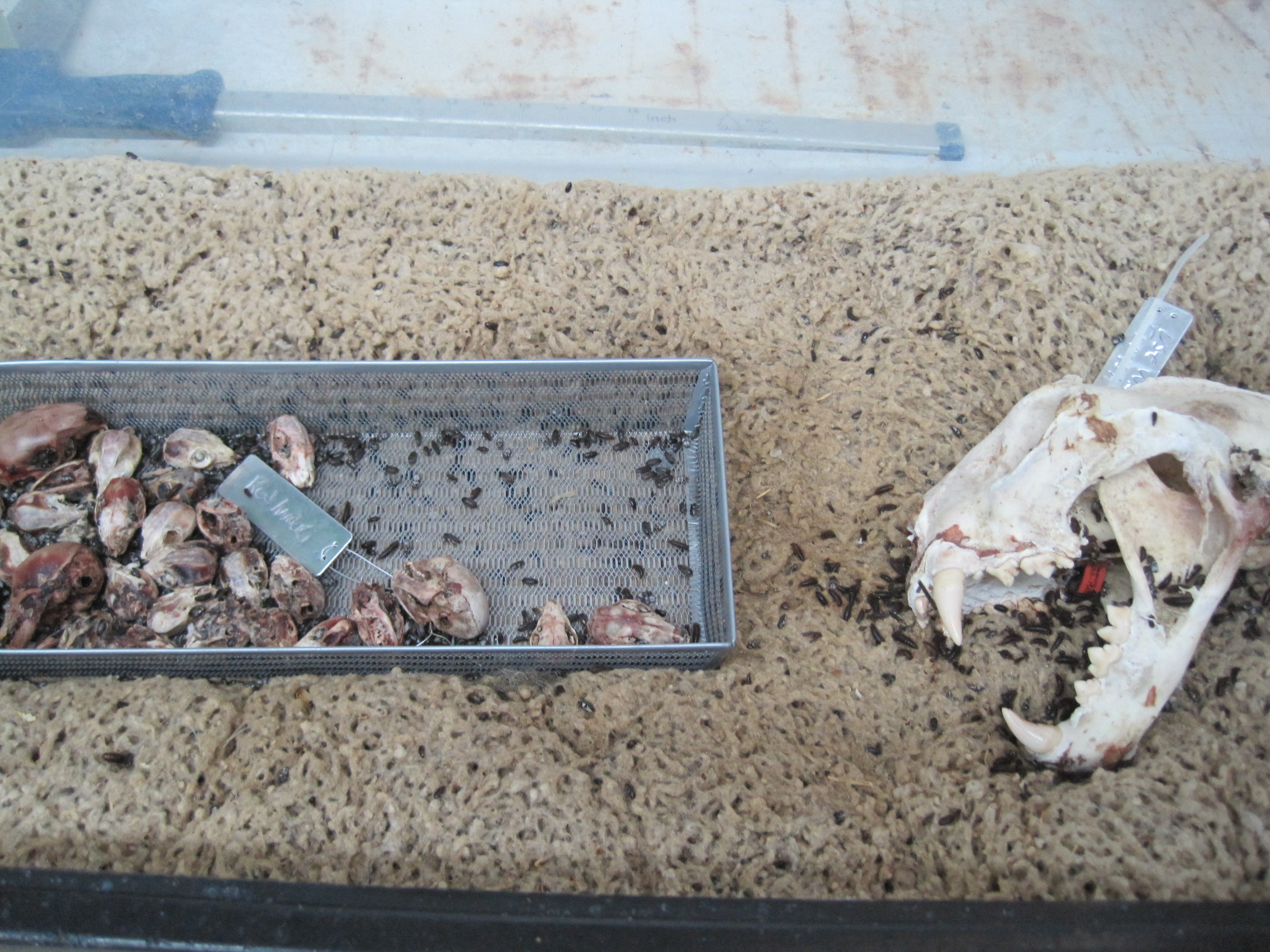
A dermestarium with Dermestes larvae

A dermestarium (pl. dermestaria) is a room, container, or terrarium where taxidermists let invertebrates - typically beetle larvae - remove (eat) flesh and other soft parts from animal carcasses or parts of animal carcasses, such as skulls. The purpose is to expose and clean individual bones or entire skeletons for study and preservation. The word dermestarium derives from Dermestes, the genus name of the beetle most commonly used for the task. Other invertebrates, notably isopods and clothes moths, have also been used.

Dermestaria are used by museums and other research institutions. Dermestaria are sometimes located in separate, bespoke buildings, as is the case at the University of Wisconsin-Madison's zoological museum. Other dermestaria are of the container or terrarium type and can be kept inside regular research and museum facilities. The use of dermestaria in the US goes back to at least the 1940s.

Prior to dermestarium deposition, the animal carcass is skinned, and excess flesh and other soft parts are removed to minimize the dermestarium time needed. The carcass is left to dry somewhat, since Dermestes larvae prefer dry over moist meat. The carcass is then put on a tray and placed inside the dermestarium, which has been prepared with a colony of Dermestes larvae. The dermestarium time needed for the larvae to strip the bones clean of flesh and soft parts ranges from a few days for small animals to several years for very large animals; once the bones have been stripped clean of all soft parts, the tray with the carcass is removed and placed in a freezer for a period sufficient to kill off any larvae and adult beetles that happened to tag along.
