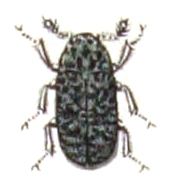

Scientific classification
- Domain: Eukaryota
- Kingdom: Animalia
- Phylum: Arthropoda
- Class: Insecta
- Order: Coleoptera
- Suborder: Polyphaga
- Family: Dermestidae
- Genus: Dermestes
- Species: D. laniarius

Binomial name
- Dermestes laniarius Illiger, 1801

= Dermestes laniarius =

Species of beetle

Dermestes laniarius is a species of beetle found in the Palearctic, including Europe, and North Africa. In Europe, it is known from Albania, Belarus, Belgium, Bosnia and Herzegovina, Bulgaria, Croatia, Cyprus, the Czech Republic, mainland Denmark, Estonia, Finland, mainland France, Germany, Hungary, mainland Italy, Kaliningrad, Latvia, Lithuania, Luxembourg, Moldova, North Macedonia, mainland Norway, Poland, Romania, Russia, Slovakia, Slovenia, mainland Spain, Sweden, Switzerland, the Netherlands, Ukraine and Former Yugoslavia.

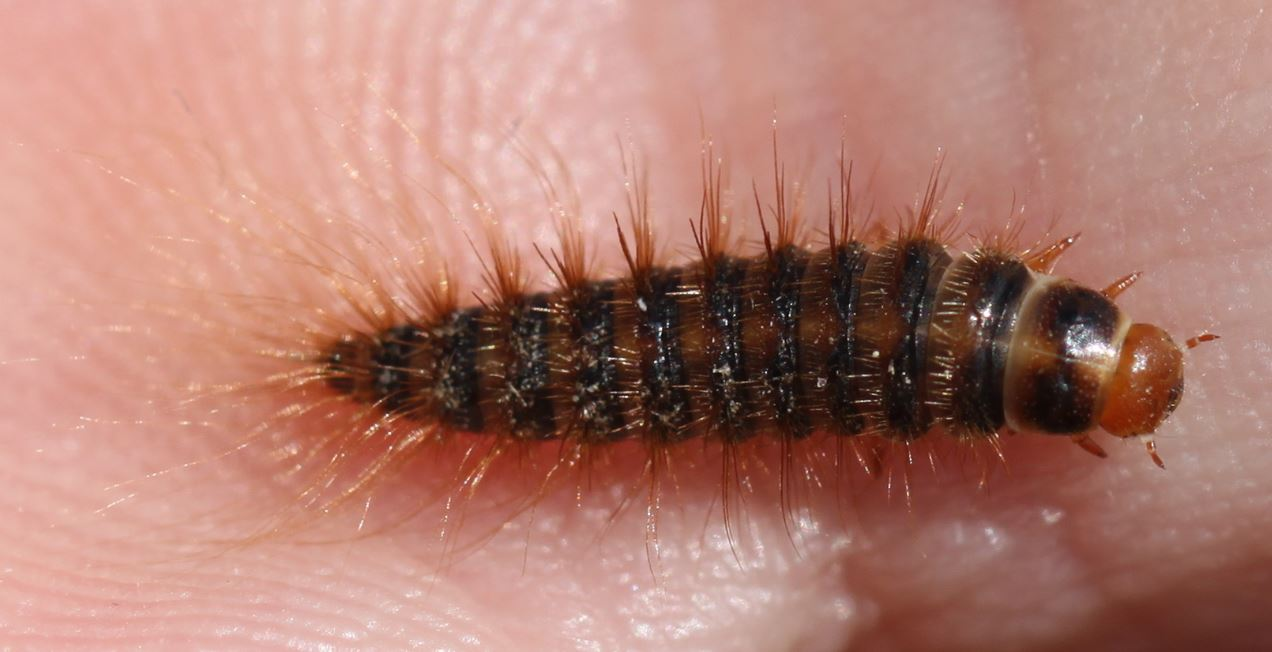
D. laniarius larva.
