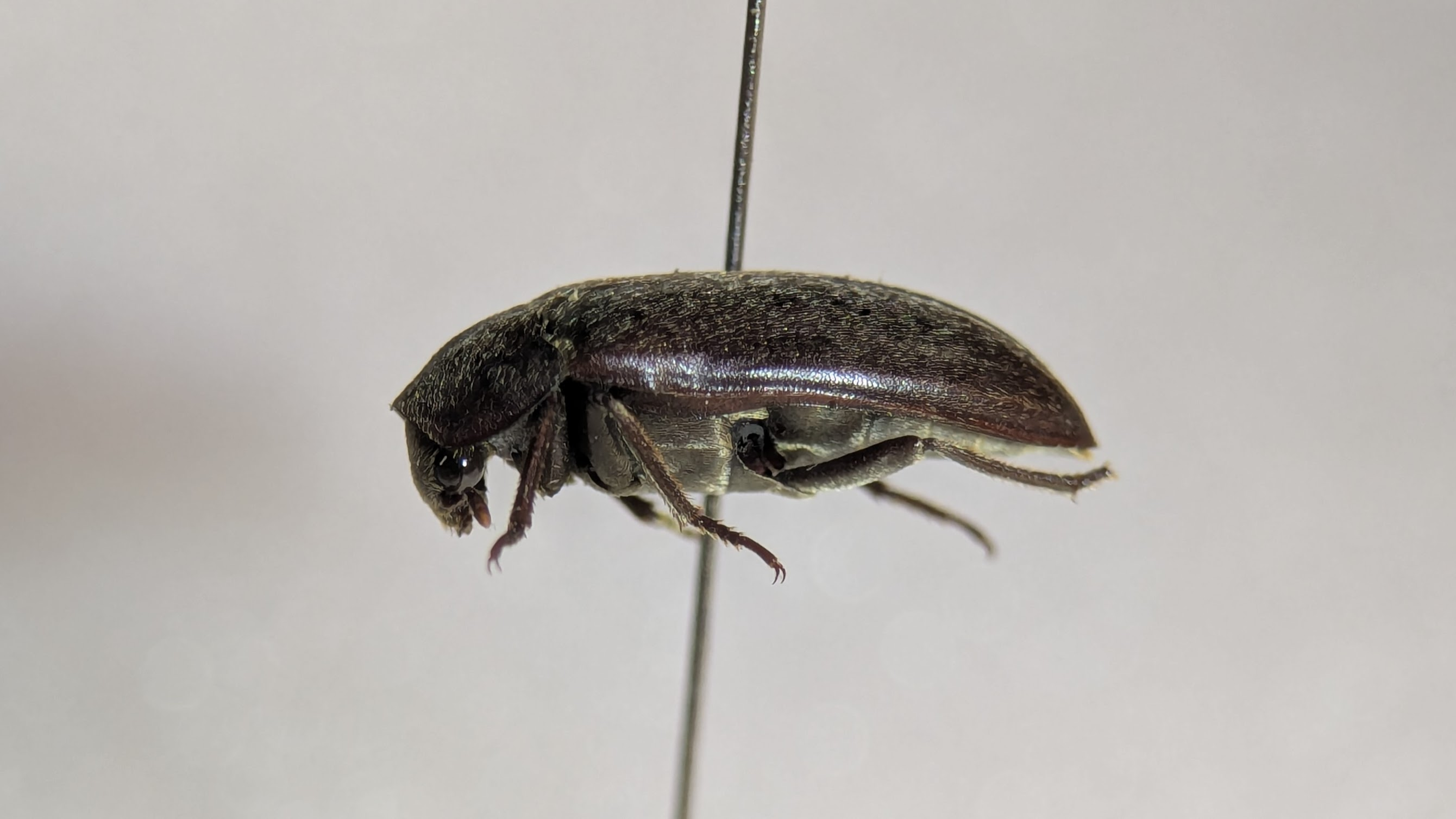

Scientific classification
- Kingdom: Animalia
- Phylum: Arthropoda
- Class: Insecta
- Order: Coleoptera
- Suborder: Polyphaga
- Family: Dermestidae
- Genus: Dermestes
- Species: D. peruvianus

Binomial name
- Dermestes peruvianus Laporte, 1840

= Dermestes peruvianus =

Species of beetle

Dermestes peruvianus, the Peruvian larder beetle, is a species of carpet beetle in the family Dermestidae. It is found in North America and Europe.

This species looks very similar to the species Dermestes haemorrhoidalis. Dermestes peruvianus can be distinguished from this species by the following traits: The pubescence on the elytra is predominantly pale yellow, short, fine and recumbent. The pubescence do not extend as a fringe beyond the lateral margins of the elytra. The satae on the head are inclined anteriad (towards mandibles) and inwards towards a central line between the eyes. The metepimeron does not have a posterior lateral spine.
