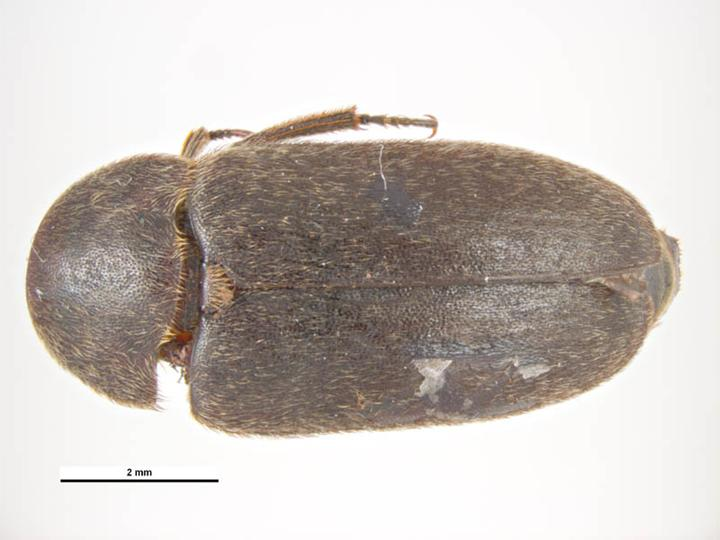

Scientific classification
- Domain: Eukaryota
- Kingdom: Animalia
- Phylum: Arthropoda
- Class: Insecta
- Order: Coleoptera
- Suborder: Polyphaga
- Family: Dermestidae
- Genus: Dermestes
- Species: D. ater

Binomial name
- Dermestes ater De Geer, 1774

= Dermestes ater =

Species of beetle

Dermestes ater is a species of beetle in the family Dermestidae, the skin beetles. It is known commonly as the black larder beetle or incinerator beetle (not to be confused with Dermestes haemorrhoidalis, the African larder beetle, also sometimes referred to as the black larder beetle). It is native to North America, but today it is found nearly worldwide. Like several other dermestid beetles, this species is a common pest of stored products.

== Description ==
The adult beetle is about 7 to 9 millimeters long. It has black or brown elytra and a coating of yellowish hairs. The male can be distinguished from the female by a row of bristles along the abdomen. The larva has long dark bristles. Its body is white except for its head capsule, dorsal plates and urogomphi, which darken in color to black, brown, or reddish as it grows. Adults reach a maximum length of about 14 mm and larvae of about 14 to 17 mm.

Adults of Dermestes ater resemble D. haemorrhoidalis and D. peruvianus but differ in several ways. In D. ater, the first visible sternite bear impressed lines parallel to the lateral margin that are angled inwards towards the base, therefore their end next to the metasternal hind margin is at some distance from the edge; while on D. haemorrhoidalis and D. peruvianus these lines are parallel to the side margin throughout their length. Dermestes ater further differs from the two other species in having a symmetrical pattern of light and dark pubescence on all abdominal sternites. The dark pubescence being near the side edges. The dark pubescence may be barely visible so these areas may appear glabrous next to the lighter (grey) pubescence. Larvae of D. ater can be distinguished from close relatives in having their urogomphi backwardly directed, but appearing nearly straight in side view. Each tibia bears a short stout spine on dorsal apex of posterior face. Abdominal tergites 4-9 without retrorse tubercles but instead each has a row of about 30 short erect setae immediately posterior to anterior transverse ridge (larvae of other species have much fewer than 30). Head without frontal tubercles.

== Life cycle ==
The female lays 1 to 25 eggs at a time. They are whitish and about 2 millimeters long. The eggs hatch in a few days, depending on temperature. Larval development also depends on temperature, as well as humidity and food availability. Each larva may proceed through six to nine instars, taking 19 to 50 days to grow to maximum size. It then pupates for several days. The adult lives for around 169 days, depending on temperature.

== Economic and scientific importance ==
The beetle attacks many types of stored food and other products. It has been found in cheese, dried fish, leather, copra, silk, wool, milk powder, incinerated waste, hog bristles, dried mushrooms, cacao, and ginger.

It is an occasional predator, feeding on live insects; it is a pest of the sericulture industry because it preys on silkworm pupae, damaging the silk cocoons in the process. It also feeds on housefly (Musca domestica) larvae and pupae in places where both insects congregate, such as poultry houses. The adult may cannibalize larvae and pupae of its own species, and the larvae may eat each other and the eggs. It is also a scavenger of dead animals. It is a pest of museum collections, such as dried insects. It has been found living in and consuming human corpses, so it may play a role in forensic entomology.

The beetle carries several parasites including chicken tapeworms, and are found inhabiting chicken coops where they can spread the parasites to the birds.
