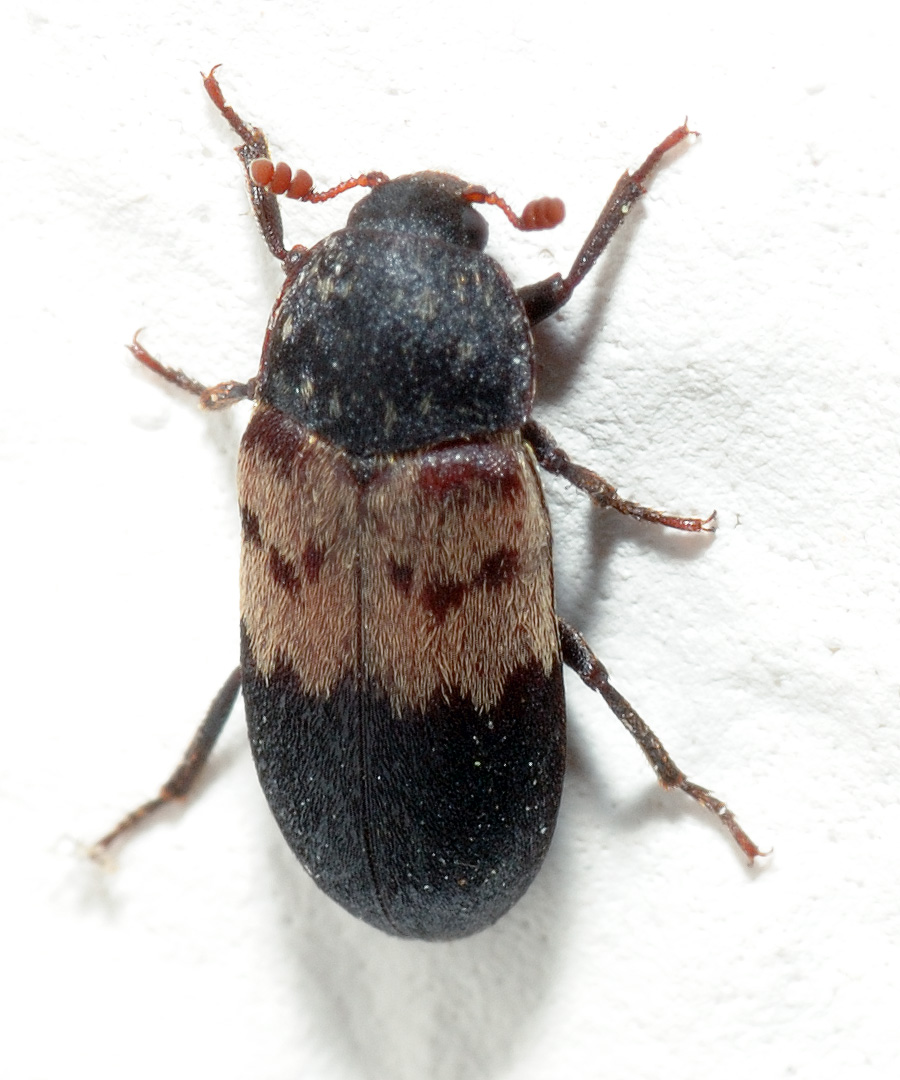

Scientific classification
- Kingdom: Animalia
- Phylum: Arthropoda
- Clade: Pancrustacea
- Class: Insecta
- Order: Coleoptera
- Suborder: Polyphaga
- Family: Dermestidae
- Genus: Dermestes
- Species: D. lardarius

Binomial name
- Dermestes lardarius Linnaeus, 1758

= Dermestes lardarius =

Species of beetle

Dermestes lardarius, commonly known as the larder beetle or moisture bug, is a species of beetle in the family Dermestidae, the skin beetles. It is found worldwide. It is a common pest of households and storage facilities ("larders") in much of the world. It eats animal products, such as dried meats and fish, pet food, skins and hides, feathers, cheese, and museum specimens such as dried insects. It may also eat plant material that is high in protein, such as grain.

The larva is longer than the adult and is covered in reddish brown or black setae. It has two back-curved, spine-like appendages on the posterior end. The larva of the black larder beetle has less strongly curved appendages. Mature larvae of both species tend to bore into hard substrates such as wood, cork, and plaster to pupate.

Adult larder beetles are generally 8,5 mm to 9,5 mm long and are dark brown with a broad, pale yellow spotted band across the upper portion of the elytra. The band contains three black dots arranged in a triangle shape. The sternum and legs of the larder beetle are covered in fine, yellow setae. Adult larder beetles are typically found outdoors in protected areas during the winter, but during the spring and early summer they enter buildings. Females lay approximately 135 eggs near a food source, and the eggs will hatch in about 12 days. The life cycle of larder beetles lasts around 40 to 50 days.
