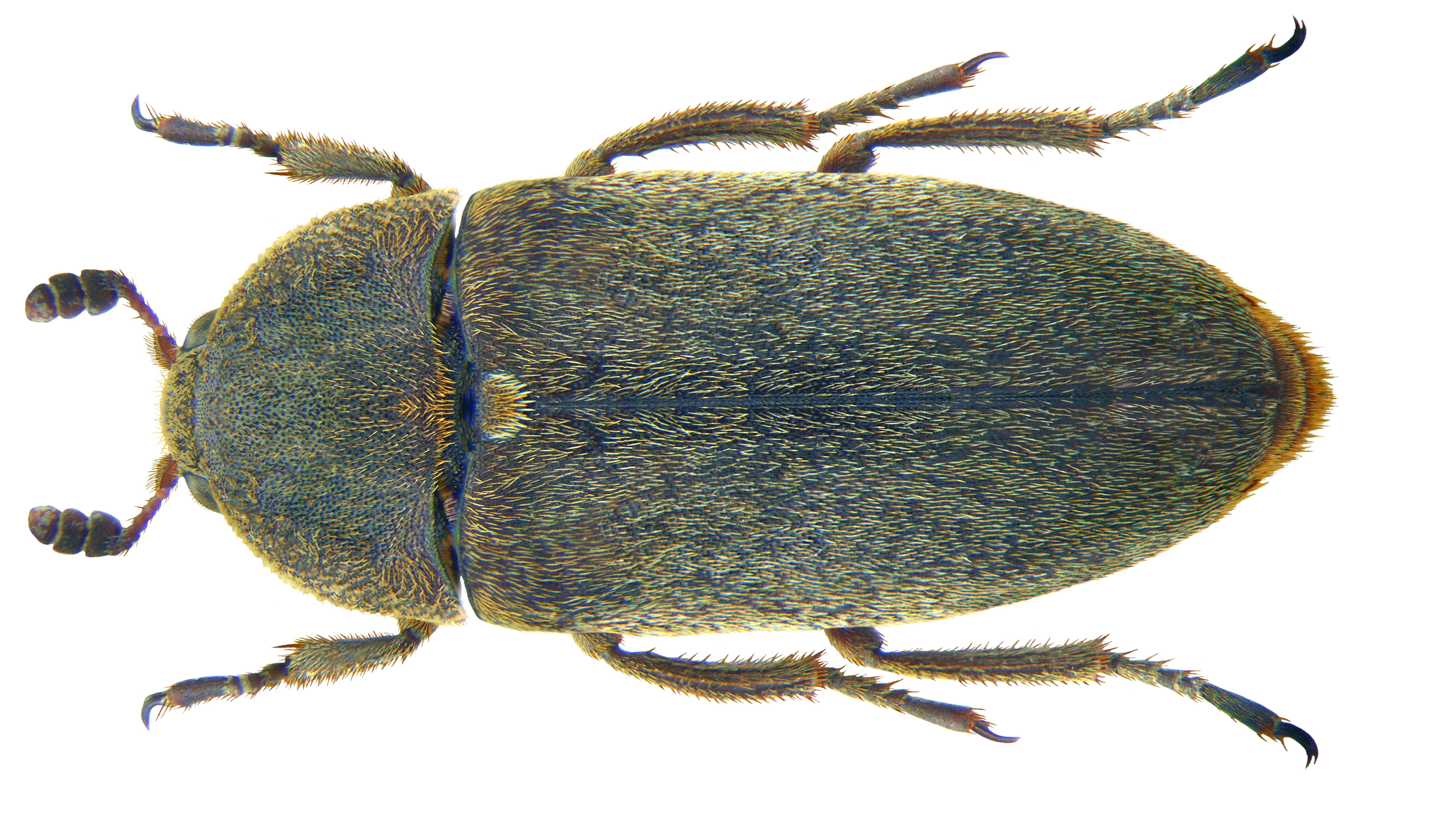

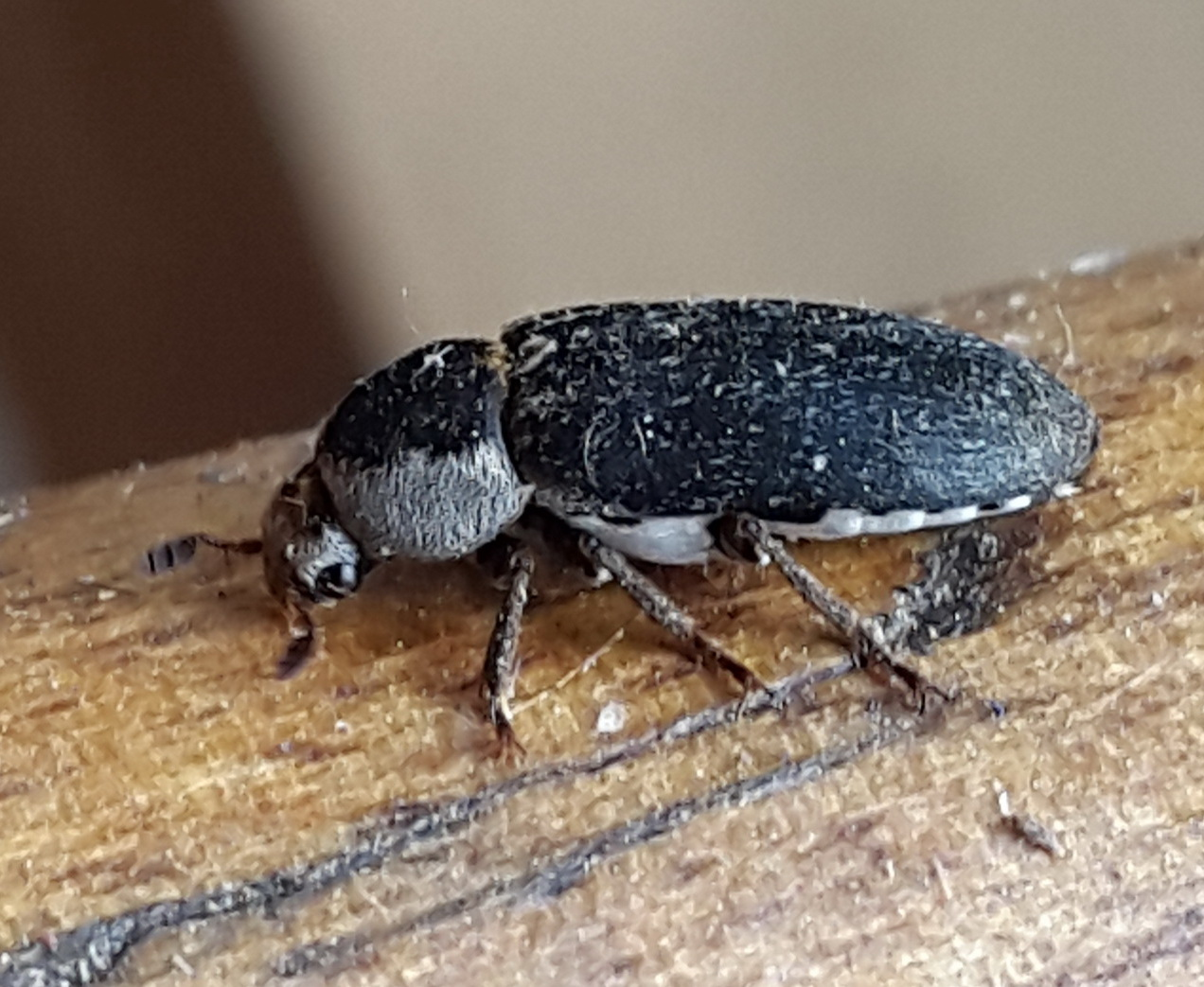

Scientific classification
- Domain: Eukaryota
- Kingdom: Animalia
- Phylum: Arthropoda
- Class: Insecta
- Order: Coleoptera
- Suborder: Polyphaga
- Family: Dermestidae
- Genus: Dermestes
- Species: D. maculatus

Binomial name
- Dermestes maculatus De Geer, 1774

Synonyms
- Dermestes vulpinus Fabricius, 1781; Dermestes marginatus Thunberg, 1781; Dermestes senex Germar, 1824; Dermestes lateralis Sturm, 1826; Dermestes elongatus Hope, 1834; Dermestes lupinus Erichson, 1843; Dermestes semistriatus Boheman, 1851; Dermestes rattulus Mulsant and Rey, 1868; Dermestes sudanicus Gredler, 1877; Dermestes truncatus Casey, 1916

= Dermestes maculatus =

Species of beetle

Dermestes maculatus is a species of beetle with a worldwide distribution, being present on all continents except Antarctica. In Europe, it is present in all countries.

== Description ==
The adult beetle is 5.5–10 mm long, and black with a band of white hairs on either side of the pronotum. The antenna end in 3-segmented clubs. The apices of the elytra are serrated and end in small projecting spines. The underside of the abdomen is mostly white with black spots at the sides and end.

The bodies of the larvae are covered in setae. The bottom of the abdomen is yellowish-brown while the dorsal surface is dark brown, usually with a yellow line in the middle. There are two urogomphi (horn-like protrusions) on the upper surface of the last segment, which curve upward and away from the tip of the abdomen.

The pupae are oval-shaped, usually smaller than the larvae, and do not have setae. Usually, the last larval skin is present as a protective covering.

== Biology ==
The species is often found underneath dead animals that have decomposed for several days to weeks. Their eating habits can cause a dead animal to become just a skeleton.

When about to pupate, larvae search for a suitable site in meat or a non-food substance (e.g. wood), where they construct a pupation chamber. Pupae not in chambers are vulnerable to cannibalism. Because of this, larvae that are unable to find somewhere to pupate will delay becoming pupae.

== Relevance to humans ==
The appearance of the beetle on decomposing remains of humans and other animals can be used to estimate postmortem interval in cases of suicide, homicide, or unattended death. The adults generally arrive within 5 to 11 days following an animal's death. The larvae develop for five to seven weeks, and the adult beetles live for four to six months.

The beetle feeds on carrion and dry animal products. They are pests of the silk industry in Italy and India. Dried fish, cheese, bacon, dog treats, and poultry are some of the foods that the beetle gets into. One study found that larvae show no preference out of calf meat, chicken meat, and pellet feed for rodents. At one time the ravages of Dermestes vulpinus [now maculatus] were so great in the skin-warehouses of Victorian London, a reward of £20,000 was offered for an available remedy.

The beetle has been known to parasitically feed on live turkeys, leaving deep wounds.

There is a known case of papular urticaria caused by D. maculatus larvae. This may have been caused by the irritant effect of the larval hairs or by an allergic reaction to proteins in the hairs.

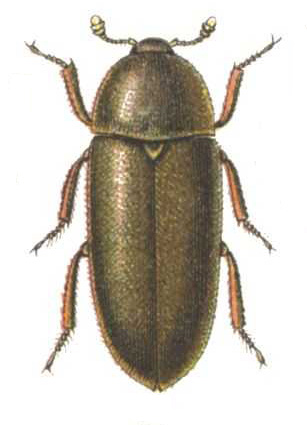
Illustration of Dermestes maculatus from Edmund Reitter "Fauna Germanica"

Dermestes maculatus is the species of carrion beetle typically used by universities and museums to remove the flesh from bones in skeleton preparation. Human and animal skeletons are prepared using this method and the practice has been in use for over 150 years. The beetles are especially useful for small animals with delicate bones.
