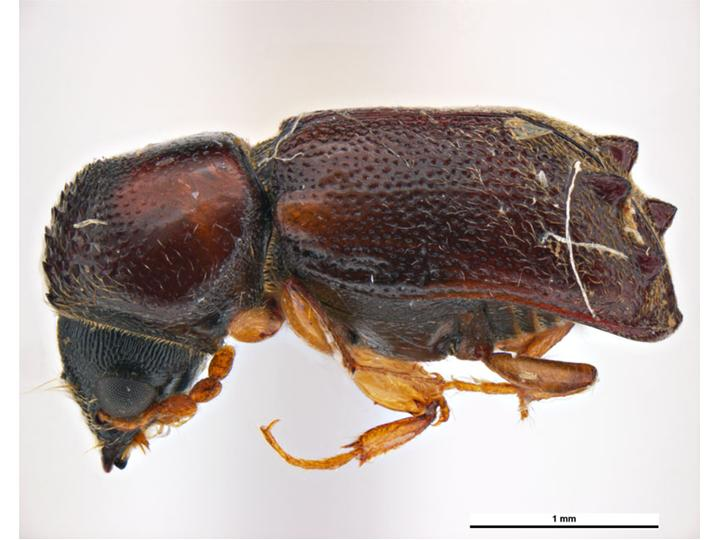
- Xyloblaptus quadrispinosus

Scientific classification
- Kingdom: Animalia
- Phylum: Arthropoda
- Class: Insecta
- Order: Coleoptera
- Suborder: Polyphaga
- Family: Bostrichidae
- Subfamily: Bostrichinae
- Tribe: Xyloperthini
- Genus: Xyloblaptus; Lesne, 1901

= Xyloblaptus =

Genus of beetles

Xyloblaptus is a genus of horned powder-post beetles in the family Bostrichidae. There are at least three described species in Xyloblaptus.

== Species ==
These three species belong to the genus Xyloblaptus:

- Xyloblaptus mexicanus Lesne, 1939
- Xyloblaptus prosopidis Fisher, 1950
- Xyloblaptus quadrispinosus (LeConte, 1866)
