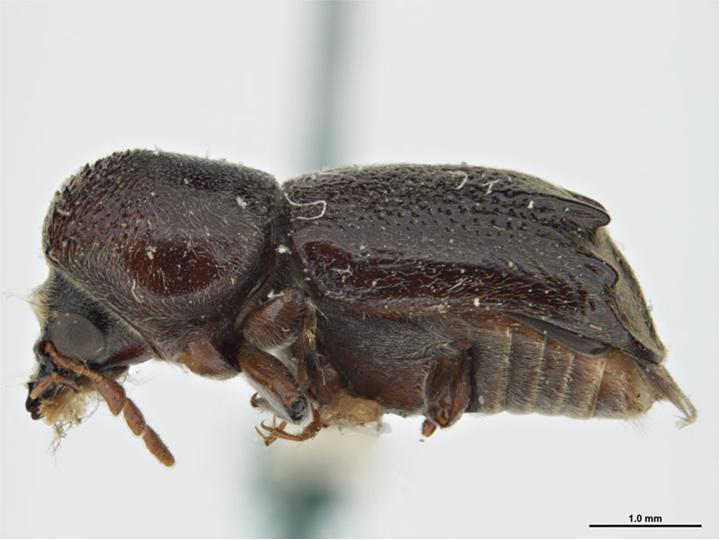

Scientific classification
- Domain: Eukaryota
- Kingdom: Animalia
- Phylum: Arthropoda
- Class: Insecta
- Order: Coleoptera
- Suborder: Polyphaga
- Family: Bostrichidae
- Genus: Dendrobiella
- Species: D. sericans

Binomial name
- Dendrobiella sericans (LeConte, 1858)

= Dendrobiella sericans =

Species of beetle

Dendrobiella sericans is a species of horned powder-post beetle in the family Bostrichidae. It is found in Central America and North America.
