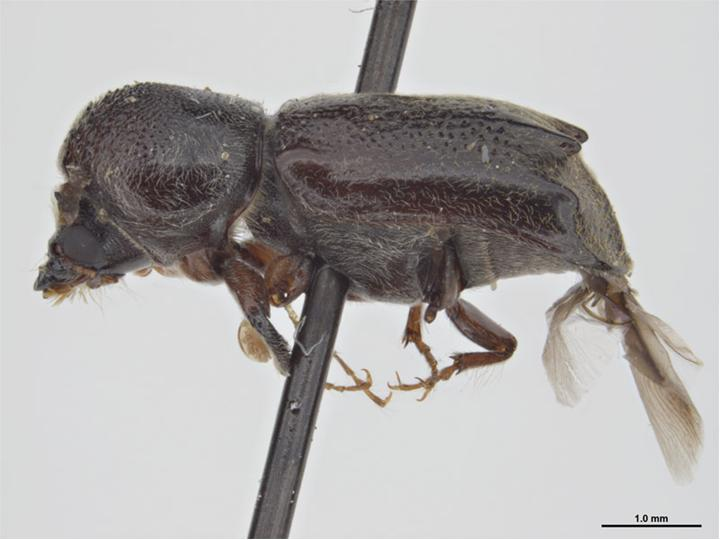

Scientific classification
- Domain: Eukaryota
- Kingdom: Animalia
- Phylum: Arthropoda
- Class: Insecta
- Order: Coleoptera
- Suborder: Polyphaga
- Family: Bostrichidae
- Genus: Dendrobiella
- Species: D. aspera

Binomial name
- Dendrobiella aspera (LeConte, 1858)

= Dendrobiella aspera =

Species of beetle

Dendrobiella aspera is a species of horned powder-post beetle in the family Bostrichidae. It is found in Central America and North America.
