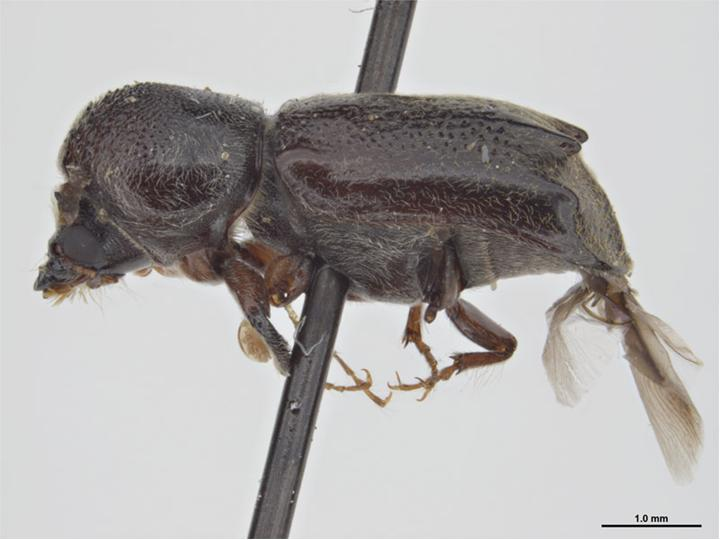
- Dendrobiella aspera

Scientific classification
- Kingdom: Animalia
- Phylum: Arthropoda
- Class: Insecta
- Order: Coleoptera
- Suborder: Polyphaga
- Family: Bostrichidae
- Subfamily: Bostrichinae
- Tribe: Xyloperthini
- Genus: Dendrobiella; Casey, 1898

= Dendrobiella =

Genus of beetles

Dendrobiella is a genus of horned powder-post beetles in the family Bostrichidae. There are about seven described species in Dendrobiella.

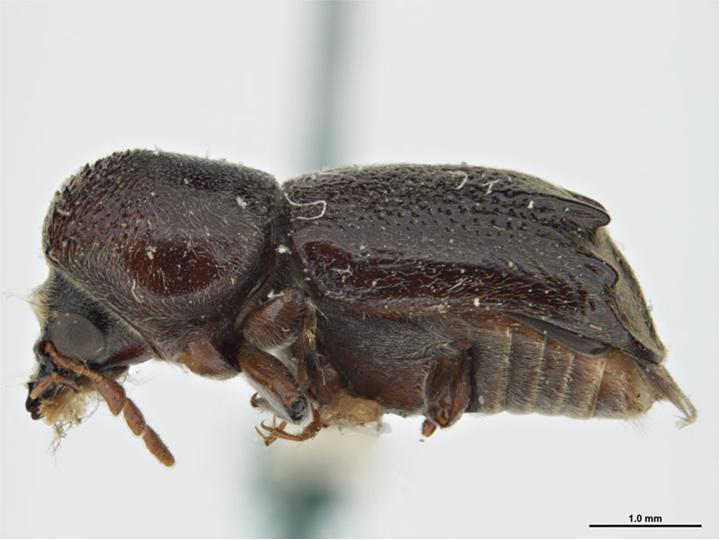
Dendrobiella sericans

== Species ==
These seven species belong to the genus Dendrobiella:

- Dendrobiella aspera (LeConte, 1858)
- Dendrobiella isthmicola Lesne, 1933
- Dendrobiella leechi Vrydagh, 1960
- Dendrobiella pubescens Casey
- Dendrobiella sericans (LeConte, 1858)
- Dendrobiella sericea (Mulsant & Wachanru, 1852)
- Dendrobiella sublaevis Casey
