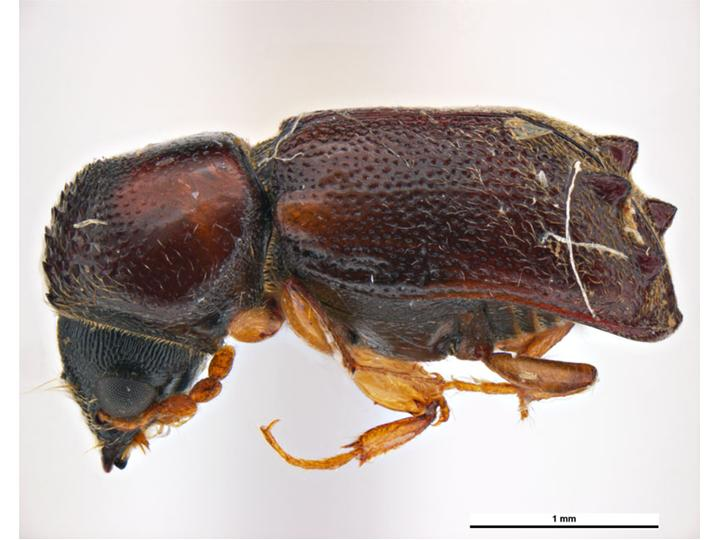

Scientific classification
- Domain: Eukaryota
- Kingdom: Animalia
- Phylum: Arthropoda
- Class: Insecta
- Order: Coleoptera
- Suborder: Polyphaga
- Family: Bostrichidae
- Genus: Xyloblaptus
- Species: X. quadrispinosus

Binomial name
- Xyloblaptus quadrispinosus (LeConte, 1866)

= Xyloblaptus quadrispinosus =

Species of beetle

Xyloblaptus quadrispinosus is a species of horned powder-post beetle in the family Bostrichidae. It is found in Central America and North America.
