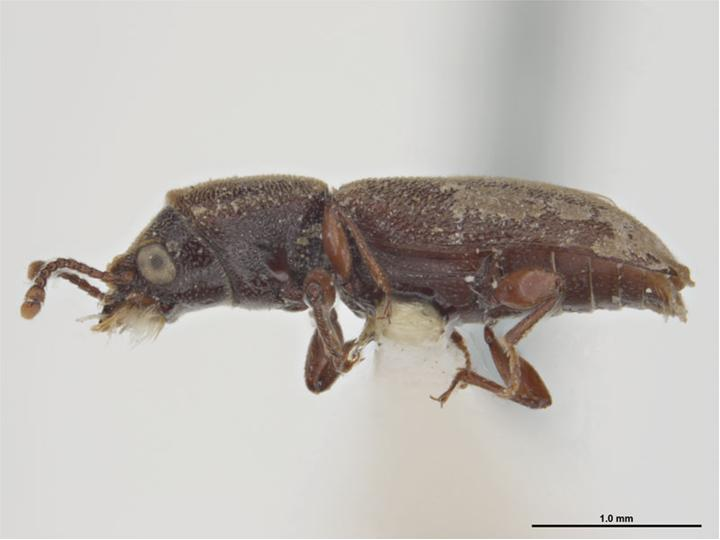

Scientific classification
- Domain: Eukaryota
- Kingdom: Animalia
- Phylum: Arthropoda
- Class: Insecta
- Order: Coleoptera
- Suborder: Polyphaga
- Family: Bostrichidae
- Genus: Trogoxylon
- Species: T. punctatum

Binomial name
- Trogoxylon punctatum LeConte, 1866

= Trogoxylon punctatum =

Species of beetle

Trogoxylon punctatum is a species of powder-post beetle in the family Bostrichidae. It is found in Central America and North America.
