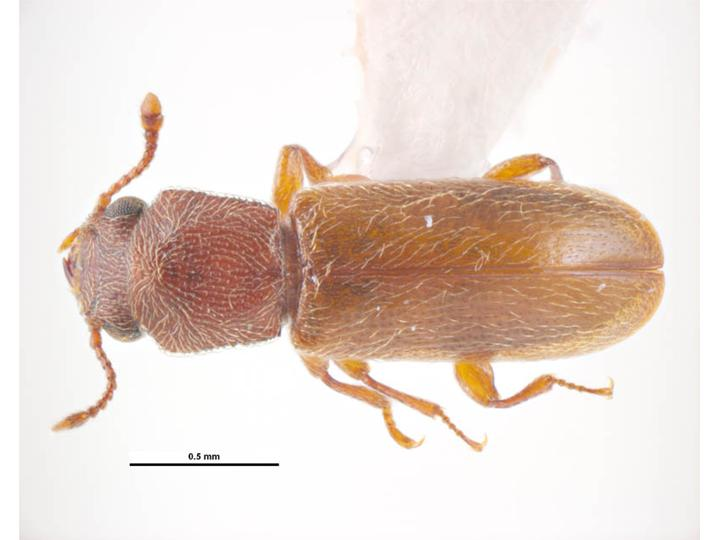

Scientific classification
- Domain: Eukaryota
- Kingdom: Animalia
- Phylum: Arthropoda
- Class: Insecta
- Order: Coleoptera
- Suborder: Polyphaga
- Family: Bostrichidae
- Genus: Trogoxylon
- Species: T. aequale

Binomial name
- Trogoxylon aequale (Wollaston, 1867)

Synonyms
- Lyctus californicus Casey, 1891; Lyctus curtulus Casey, 1891

= Trogoxylon aequale =

Species of beetle

Trogoxylon aequale is a species of powder-post beetle in the family Bostrichidae. It is found in Africa, the Caribbean, Europe and Northern Asia (excluding China), Central America, North America, and South America.
