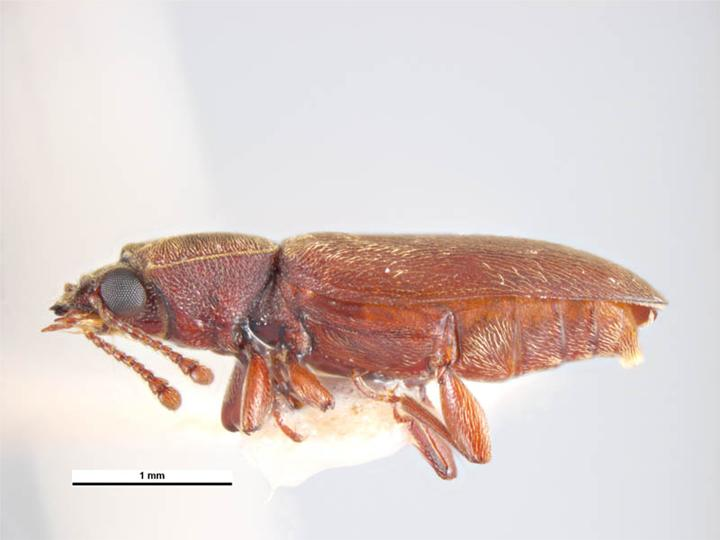

Scientific classification
- Domain: Eukaryota
- Kingdom: Animalia
- Phylum: Arthropoda
- Class: Insecta
- Order: Coleoptera
- Suborder: Polyphaga
- Family: Bostrichidae
- Genus: Trogoxylon
- Species: T. parallelipipedum

Binomial name
- Trogoxylon parallelipipedum (Melsheimer, 1846)

= Trogoxylon parallelipipedum =

Species of beetle

Trogoxylon parallelipipedum, the velvety powderpost beetle, is a species of powderpost beetle in the family Bostrichidae. It is found in Australia, Europe and Northern Asia (excluding China), and North America.
