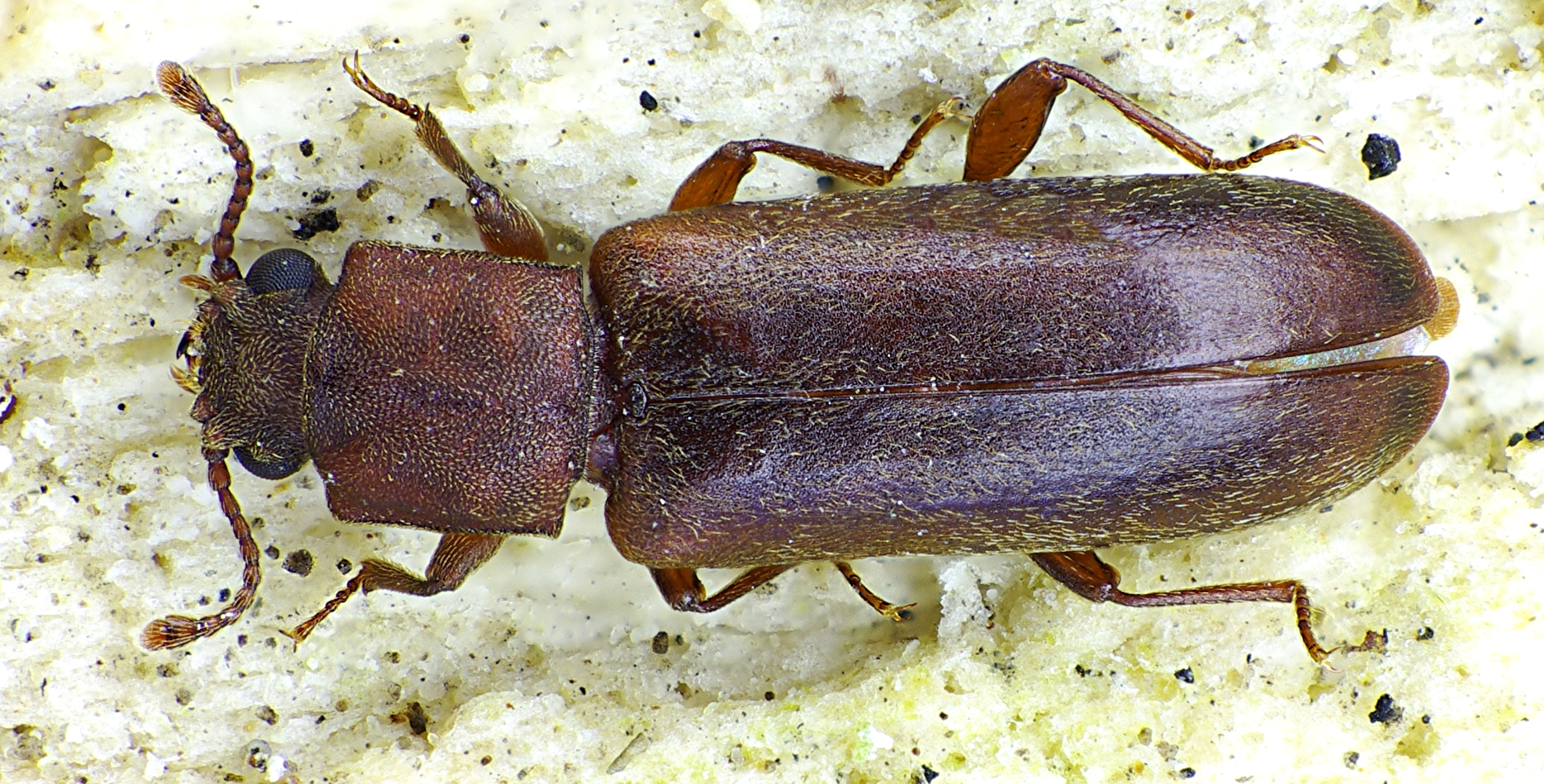
- Trogoxylon impressum

Scientific classification
- Kingdom: Animalia
- Phylum: Arthropoda
- Class: Insecta
- Order: Coleoptera
- Suborder: Polyphaga
- Family: Bostrichidae
- Subfamily: Lyctinae
- Tribe: Trogoxylini
- Genus: Trogoxylon; LeConte, 1862

Species
- See text

= Trogoxylon =

Genus of beetles

Trogoxylon is a genus of beetles in the family Bostrichidae. They are members of the subfamily Lyctinae, the powderpost beetles.

Species include:

- Trogoxylon aequale
- Trogoxylon angulicollis
- Trogoxylon auriculatum
- Trogoxylon caseyi
- Trogoxylon giacobbii
- Trogoxylon impressum
- Trogoxylon ingae
- Trogoxylon parallelipipedum
- Trogoxylon praeustum
- Trogoxylon punctatum
- Trogoxylon punctipenne
- Trogoxylon rectangulum
- Trogoxylon recticolle
- Trogoxylon spinifrons
- Trogoxylon ypsilon
