= List of Ptinidae genera =

These 121 genera belong to the family Ptinidae, death-watch and spider beetles. There are about 100 additional genera in Ptinidae, with at least 2,200 described species. More species are listed under its subfamily Anobiinae.

== Ptinidae genera ==
- Actenobius Fall, 1905^{i c g}
- Anakania Pic, 1901^{g}
- Anobiopsis Fall, 1905^{i c g}
- Anobium Fabricius, 1775^{i c g}
- Australanobium Español, 1976^{g}
- Byrrhodes LeConte, 1878^{i c g}
- Cacotemnus LeConte, 1861^{g}
- Caenocara Thomson, 1859^{i c g}
- Caenotylistus Sakai, 1987^{g}
- Calymmaderus Solier, 1849^{i c g b}
- Calytheca White, 1973^{i c g}
- Coleoaethes Philips, 1998^{g}
- Colposternus Fall, 1905^{i c g}
- Cryptopeniculus Philips, 2004^{g}
- Cryptorama Fall, 1905^{i c g}
- Cryptoramorphus White, 1966^{i c g}
- Ctenobium LeConte, 1865^{i c g}
- Deroptilinus Lea, 1924^{g}
- Desmatogaster Knutson, 1963^{i c g}
- Dignomus Wollaston, 1862^{g}
- Diplocotes Westwood, 1869^{g}
- Dorcatoma Herbst, 1792^{i c g}
- Dorcatomiella Blair, 1935^{g}
- Dryophilodes Blackburn, 1891^{b}
- Ectrephes Pascoe, 1866^{g}
- Epauloecus Mulsant & Rey, 1868^{b}
- Episernus Thomson, 1863^{i c g}
- Ernobius Thomson, 1859^{i c g}
- Euceratocerus LeConte, 1874^{i c g}
- Eucrada LeConte, 1861^{i c g b}
- Euvrilletta Fall, 1905^{i c g}
- Falsogastrallus Pic, 1914^{i c g}
- Gastrallanobium Wickham, 1914^{g}
- Gastrallus Jacquelin du Val, 1860^{i c g}
- Gibbium Scopoli, 1777^{i c g}
- Gnostus Westwood, 1855^{i c g}
- Hadrobregmus Thomson, 1859^{i c g}
- Hadrotinus White, 1973^{g}
- Hedobia Dejean, 1821^{i c g}
- Hemicoelus LeConte, 1861^{i c g}
- Hisamatsua Sakai, 1977^{g}
- Holcobius Sharp, 1881^{i c g}
- Homophthalmus Abeille de Perrin, 1875^{g}
- Hyperisus Mulsant & Rey, 1863^{g}
- Indanobium ^{g}
- Kedirinus Bellés, 1991^{g}
- Lachnoniptus Philip, 1998^{g}
- Lasioderma Stephens, 1835^{i c g}
- Leanobium Español, 1972^{g}
- Megorama Fall, 1905^{i c g}
- Mesocoelopus Jacquelin du Val, 1860^{i c g b}
- Mesothes Mulsant & Rey, 1864^{g}
- Metholcus Jacquelin du Val, 1860^{g}
- Meziomorphum Pic, 1898^{g}
- Mezium Curtis, 1828^{i c g}
- Microbregma Seidlitz, 1889^{i c g}
- Microzogus Fall, 1905^{i c g}
- Mimogastrallus Sakai, 2003^{g}
- Mirosternus Sharp, 1881^{i c g}
- Mizodorcatoma Hayashi, 1955^{g}
- Myrmecoptinus Wasmann, 1916^{g}
- Neohedobia Fisher, 1919^{i c g}
- Neosothes White, 1967^{i g}
- Neoxyletobius Español & Viñolas, 1996^{i c g}
- Nepalanobium Sakai, 1983^{g}
- Nesocoelopus Español, 1977^{g}
- Nicobium LeConte, 1861^{i c g}
- Niptinus Fall, 1905^{i c g}
- Niptus Boieldieu, 1856^{i c g}
- Okamninus Mynhardt & Philips, 2013^{g}
- Oligomerus Redtenbacher, 1849^{i c g}
- Oviedinus Bellés, 2010^{g}
- Ozognathus LeConte, 1861^{i c g}
- Paralobium Fall, 1905^{i c g}
- Parobius White, 1966^{g}
- Paroligomerus Logvinovskij, 1979^{g}
- Petalanobium Pic, 1922^{g}
- Petalium LeConte, 1861^{i c g b}
- Pitnus Gorham, 1883^{i c g}
- Platybregmus Fisher, 1934^{i c g}
- Pocapharaptinus Philips & Akotsen, 2009^{g}
- Priartobium Reitter, 1901^{g}
- Priobium Motschulsky, 1845^{i c g}
- Protheca LeConte, 1865^{i c g}
- Pseudeurostus Heyden, 1906^{i c g}
- Pseudodorcatoma Pic, 1905^{g}
- Pseudodryophilus Heyden, 1891^{g}
- Ptilineurus Reitter, 1902^{i c g}
- Ptilinobium White, 1976^{i c g}
- Ptilinus Mueller, 1764^{i c g b} (death-watch beetles)
- Ptinomorphus Mulsant & Rey, 1868^{g b}
- Ptinus Linnaeus, 1766^{i c g}
- Sculptotheca Schilsky, 1900^{i c g}
- Serianotus Ford, 1970^{g}
- Sphaericus Wollaston, 1854^{i c g}
- Stagetodes Español, 1970^{g}
- Stagetomorphus Pic, 1914^{g}
- Stagetus Wollaston, 1861^{i c g}
- Stegobium Motschulsky, 1860^{i c g}
- Stichtoptychus Fall, 1905^{i c g}
- Striatheca White, 1973^{i c g}
- Stromatanobium Viñolas, 2014^{g}
- Sucinoptinus Bellés, 2007^{g}
- Sulcoptinus Bellés, 1988^{g}
- Tipnus Thomson, 1863^{i c g}
- Trichobiopsis White, 1973^{g}
- Trichodesma LeConte, 1861^{i c g}
- Tricorynus Waterhouse, 1849^{i c g}
- Trigonogenius Solier, 1849^{i g}
- Trymolophus Bellés, 1990^{g}
- Utobium Fall, 1905^{i c g}
- Venablesia Britton, 1960^{g}
- Vrilletta LeConte, 1874^{i c g}
- Xarifa Fall, 1905^{i c g}
- Xenocotylus Whorrall & Philips, 2020
- Xeranobium Fall, 1905^{i c g}
- Xestobium Motschulsky, 1845^{i c g}
- Xyletinites Heyden, 1866^{g}
- Xyletinus Latreille, 1809^{i c g}
- Xyletobius Sharp, 1881^{i c g}
- Xyletomerus Fall, 1905^{i c g}
- Xylodes Waterhouse, 1876^{g}

Data sources: i = ITIS, c = Catalogue of Life, g = GBIF, b = Bugguide.net
