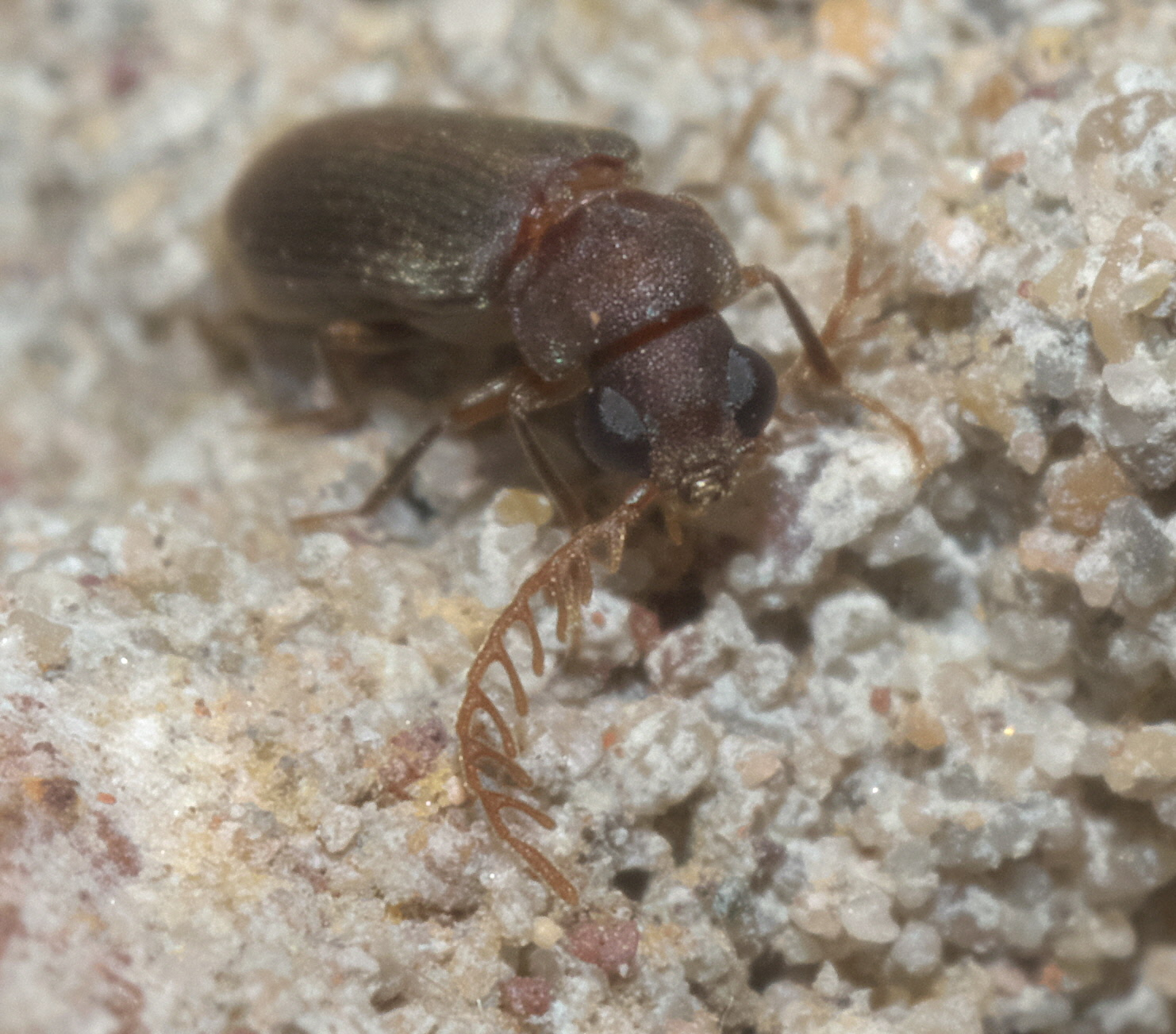
- Euceratocerus gibbifrons

Scientific classification
- Kingdom: Animalia
- Phylum: Arthropoda
- Clade: Pancrustacea
- Class: Insecta
- Order: Coleoptera
- Suborder: Polyphaga
- Family: Ptinidae
- Subfamily: Anobiinae; Fleming, 1821

Tribes
- Anobiini Fleming, 1821; Colposternini White, 1982; Euceratocerini White, 1982; Gastrallini White, 1982; Hadrobregmini White, 1982; Nicobiini White, 1982; Stegobiini White, 1982; (The tribes by White may be considered invalid.)

= Anobiinae =

Subfamily of beetles

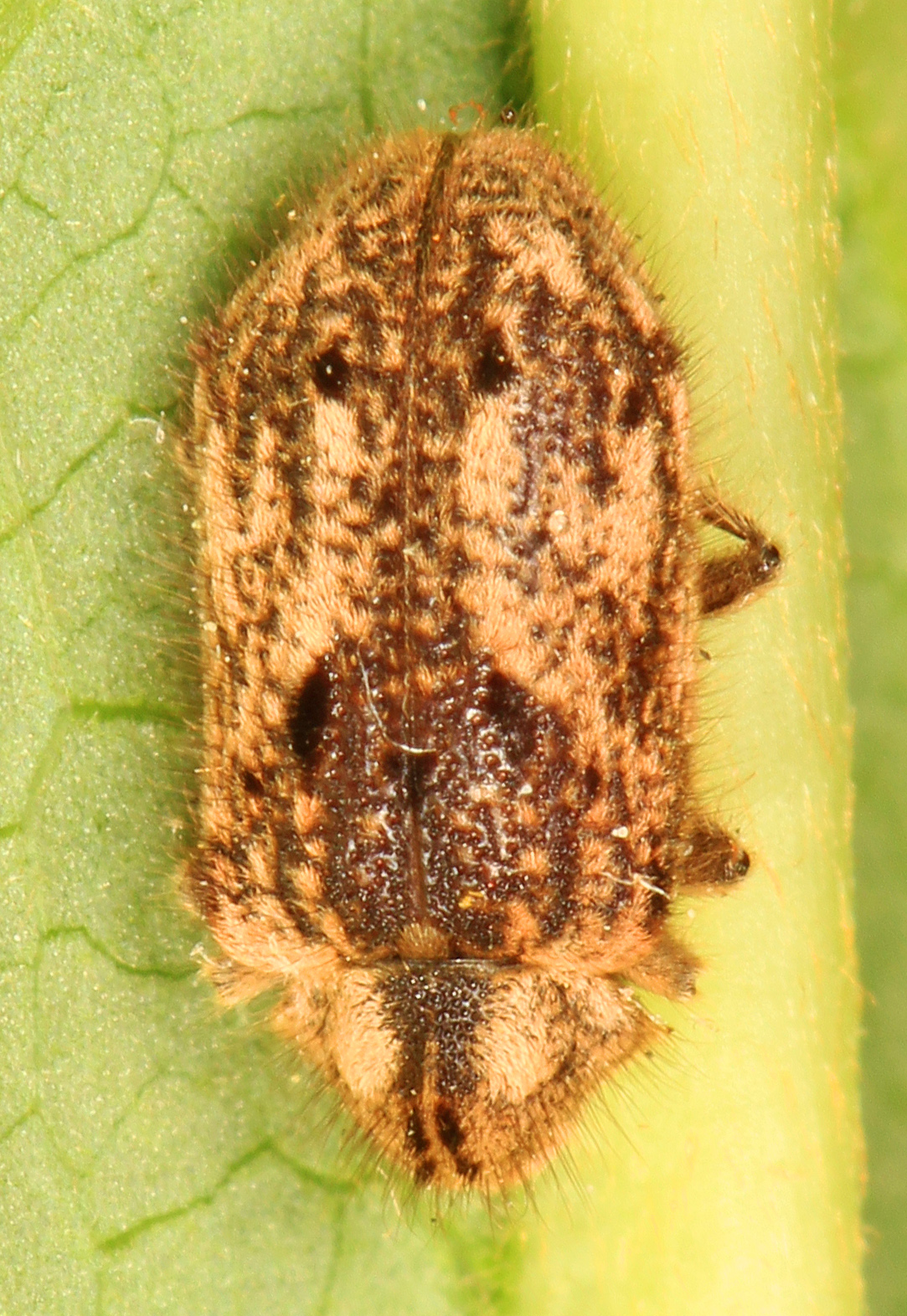
Trichodesma

Anobiinae is a subfamily of beetles in the family Ptinidae (formerly Anobiidae), containing at least 45 genera.

The larvae of a number of species tend to bore into wood, earning them the name "woodworm" or "wood borer". A few species, such as the common furniture beetle, Anobium punctatum, are pests, causing damage to wooden furniture and house structures.

Members of this subfamily are also referred to as death-watch beetles.

== Genera ==
These 46 genera belong to the subfamily Anobiinae:

- Actenobius Fall, 1905^{i c g b}
- Allobregmus Español, 1970
- Anobichnium Linck, 1949
- Anobiopsis Fall, 1905^{i c g}
- Anobium Fabricius, 1775^{i c g b}
- Anomodesmina Español, 1991
- Australanobium Español, 1976^{g}
- Belemia Español, 1984
- Cacotemnus LeConte, 1861^{g}
- Colposternus Fall, 1905^{i c g}
- Ctenobium LeConte, 1865^{i c g b}
- Desmatogaster Knutson, 1963^{i c g}
- Endroedyina Español et Comas, 1991
- Euceratocerus LeConte, 1874^{i c g b}
- Falsogastrallus Pic, 1914^{i c g}
- Gastrallus Jacquelin du Val, 1860^{i c g b}
- Hadrobregmus Thomson, 1859^{i c g b}
- Hemicoelus LeConte, 1861^{i c g b}
- Hemigastrallus Español et Comas, 1991
- Leptanobium Español et Comas, 1988
- Macranobium Broun, 1886
- Magnanobium Pic, 1926
- Megabregmus Español, 1970
- Microbregma Seidlitz, 1889^{i c g b}
- Mimogastrallus Sakai, 2003^{g}
- Mimotrypopitys Pic, 1931
- Neoligomerus Español, 1981
- Nicobium LeConte, 1861^{i c g b}
- Oligomerus Redtenbacher, 1847^{i c g b}
- Paroligomerus Logvinovskiy, 1979^{g}
- Platybregmus Fisher, 1934^{i c g b}
- Priartobium Reitter, 1901^{g}
- Priobium Motschulsky, 1845^{i c g b}
- Pseudoligomerus Pic, 1933
- Pseudoserranobium Toskina, 2000
- Ptilinobium White, 1976^{i c g}
- Serranobium White, 1975
- Stegobium Motschulsky, 1860^{i c g b}
- Tasmanobium Lea, 1924
- Trichobiopsis White, 1973^{g}
- Trichodesma Leconte, 1861^{i c g b}
- Trichodesmina Español, 1982
- Xenocera Broun, 1881
- Xeranobium Fall, 1905^{i c g b}
- † Gastrallanobium Wickham, 1914^{g}

Data sources: i = ITIS, c = Catalogue of Life, g = GBIF, b = Bugguide.net
