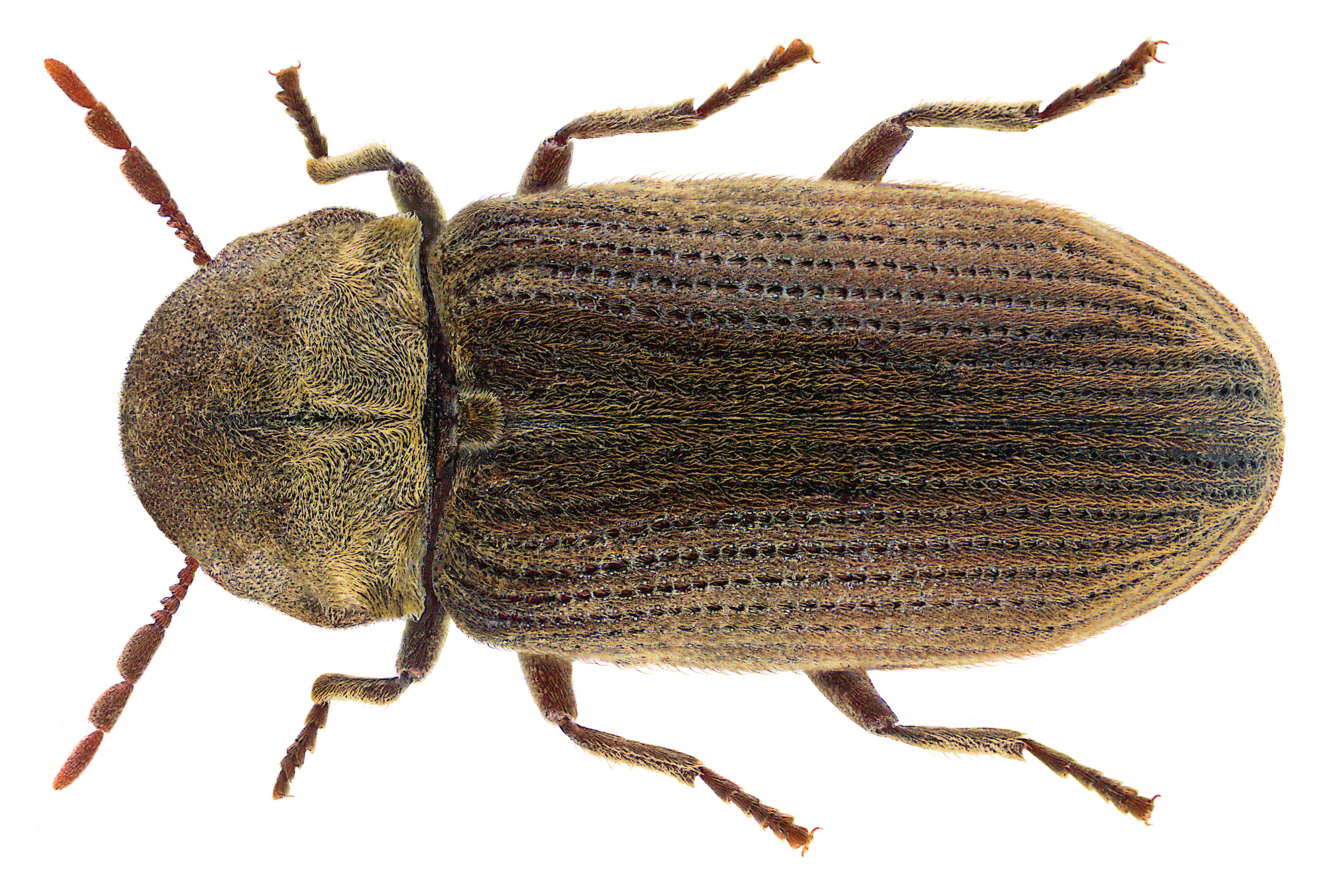
- Hadrobregmus denticollis

Scientific classification
- Kingdom: Animalia
- Phylum: Arthropoda
- Class: Insecta
- Order: Coleoptera
- Suborder: Polyphaga
- Family: Ptinidae
- Subfamily: Anobiinae
- Tribe: Hadrobregmini

= Hadrobregmini =

Tribe of beetles

Hadrobregmini is a tribe of death-watch beetles in the family Ptinidae. There are at least 3 genera and about 16 described species in Hadrobregmini.

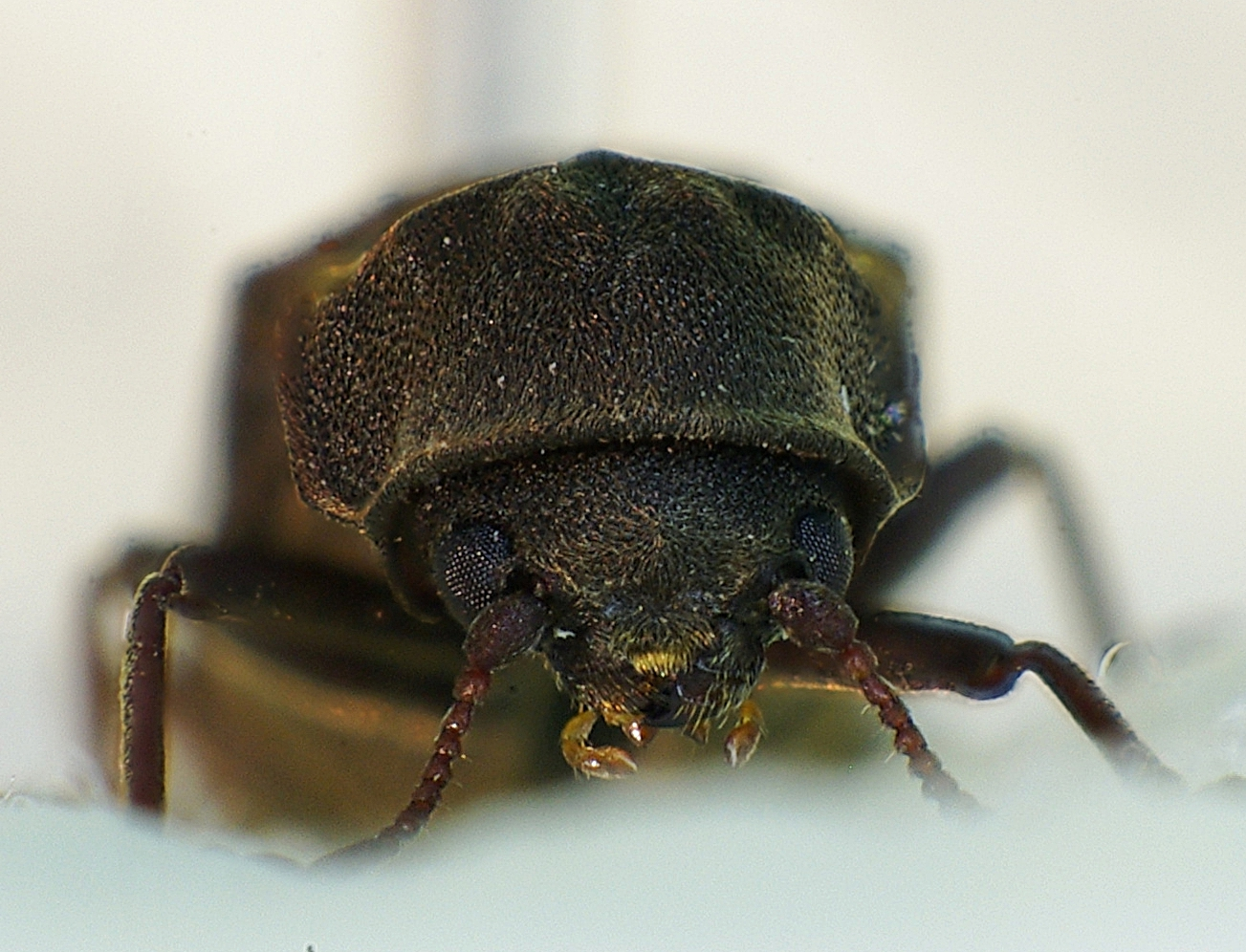
Hadrobregmus pertinax

== Genera ==
These genera belong to the tribe Hadrobregmini:

- Allobregmus Español, 1970
- Belemia Español, 1984
- Desmatogaster Knutson, 1963^{i c g}
- Hadrobregmus Thomson, 1859^{i c g b}
- Megabregmus Español, 1970
- Priobium Motschulsky, 1845^{i c g b}
- Trichobiopsis White, 1973^{g}

Data sources: i = ITIS, c = Catalogue of Life, g = GBIF, b = Bugguide.net
