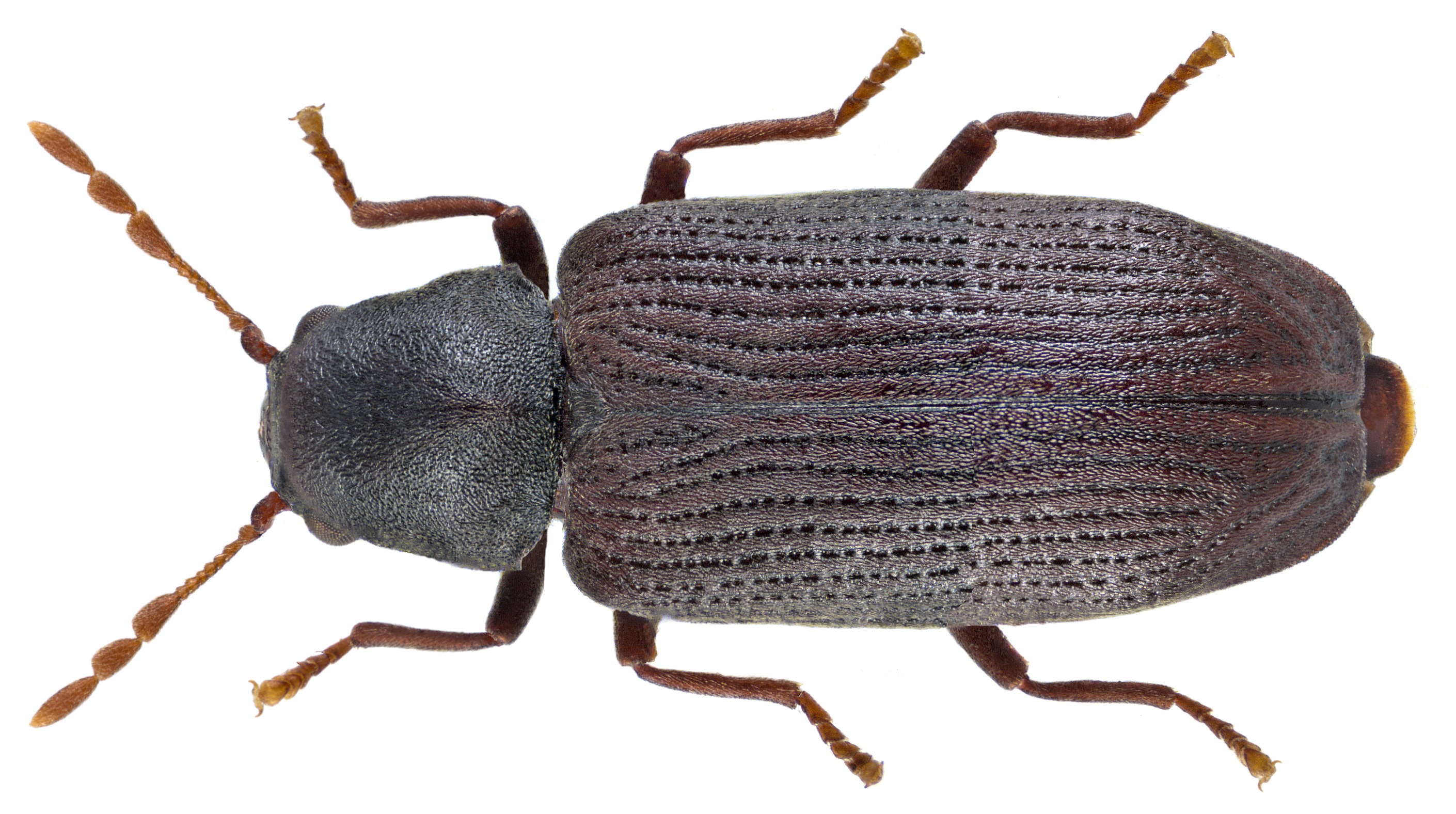
- Hemicoelus fulvicornis

Scientific classification
- Kingdom: Animalia
- Phylum: Arthropoda
- Class: Insecta
- Order: Coleoptera
- Suborder: Polyphaga
- Family: Ptinidae
- Subfamily: Anobiinae
- Tribe: Anobiini

= Anobiini =

Tribe of beetles

Anobiini is a tribe of death-watch beetles in the family Ptinidae. There are at least 6 genera and 20 described species in Anobiini.

== Genera ==
These genera belong to the tribe Anobiini:

- Anobium Fabricius, 1775^{i c g b}
- Cacotemnus LeConte, 1861^{g}
- Hemicoelinum Español, 1971
- Hemicoelus LeConte, 1861^{i c g b}
- Microbregma Seidlitz, 1889^{i c g b}
- Platybregmus Fisher, 1934^{i c g b}

Data sources: i = ITIS, c = Catalogue of Life, g = GBIF, b = Bugguide.net
