= Xeranobium cinereum =

Scientific classification
- Kingdom: Animalia
- Phylum: Arthropoda
- Class: Insecta
- Order: Coleoptera
- Suborder: Polyphaga
- Family: Ptinidae
- Tribe: Euceratocerini
- Genus: Xeranobium
- Species: X. cinereum

Binomial name
- Xeranobium cinereum (Horn, 1894)

Species of beetle

Xeranobium cinereum is a species of death-watch beetle in the family Ptinidae. It is found in North America.
