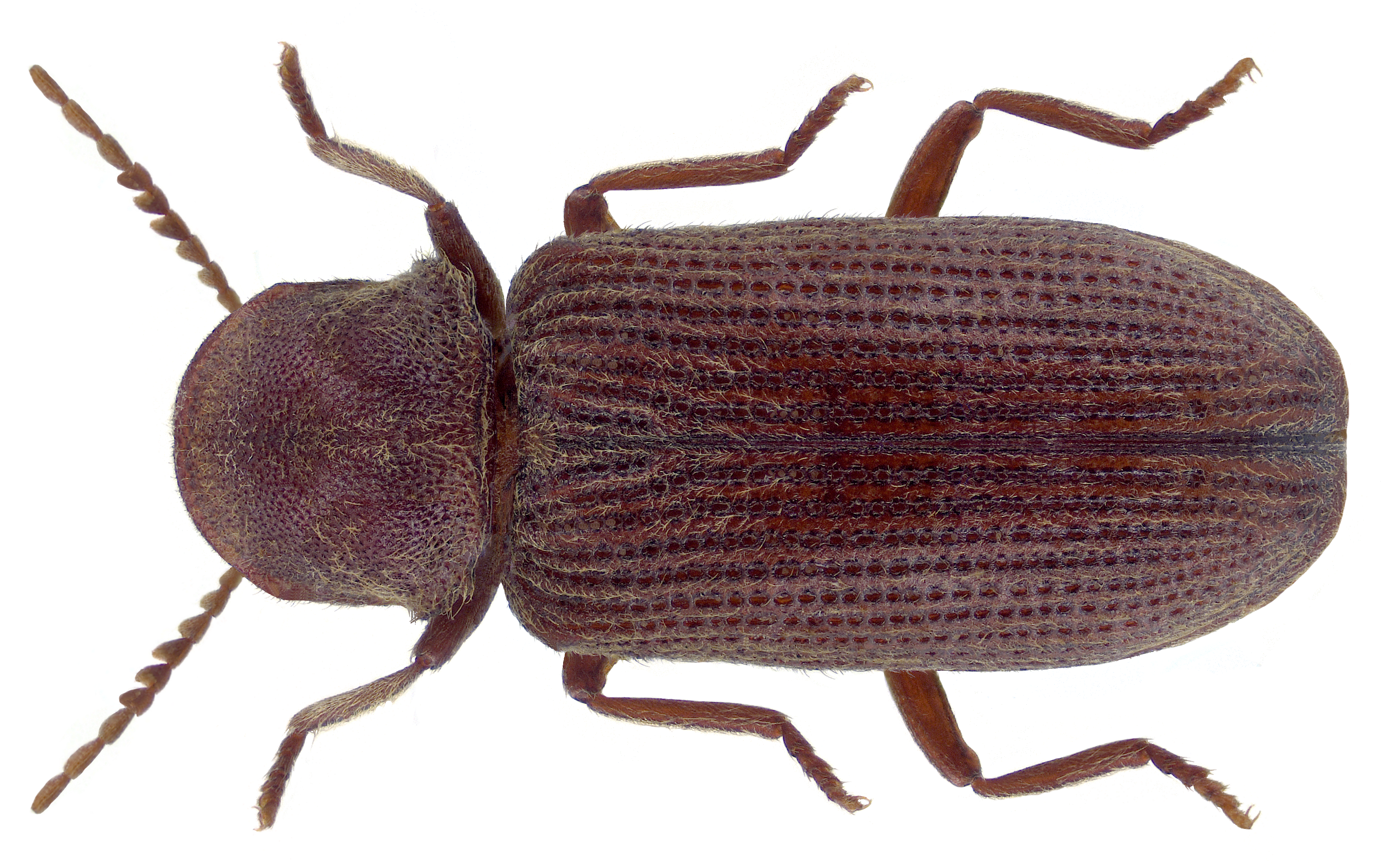

Scientific classification
- Kingdom: Animalia
- Phylum: Arthropoda
- Class: Insecta
- Order: Coleoptera
- Suborder: Polyphaga
- Family: Ptinidae
- Subfamily: Anobiinae
- Genus: Priobium
- Species: P. carpini

Binomial name
- Priobium carpini (Herbst, 1793)

= Priobium carpini =

Species of beetle

Priobium carpini is a species of death-watch beetle in the family Ptinidae. It is found in Europe and Northern Asia (excluding China) and North America.
