= Nicobium castaneum =

Scientific classification
- Kingdom: Animalia
- Phylum: Arthropoda
- Clade: Pancrustacea
- Class: Insecta
- Order: Coleoptera
- Suborder: Polyphaga
- Family: Ptinidae
- Genus: Nicobium
- Species: N. castaneum

Binomial name
- Nicobium castaneum (Olivier, 1790)

Synonyms
- Nicobium fasciatum (Dufour, 1843); Nicobium hirtum (Illiger, 1807); Nicobium tomentosum Mulsant and Rey, 1863

Species of beetle

Nicobium castaneum is a species of death-watch beetle in the family Ptinidae. It is found in Africa, Europe and Northern Asia (excluding China), North America, and Southern Asia.
