= Priobium sericeum =

Scientific classification
- Kingdom: Animalia
- Phylum: Arthropoda
- Class: Insecta
- Order: Coleoptera
- Suborder: Polyphaga
- Family: Ptinidae
- Genus: Priobium
- Species: P. sericeum

Binomial name
- Priobium sericeum (Say, 1825)

Species of beetle

Priobium sericeum, the silky anobiid, is a species of death-watch beetle in the family Ptinidae. It is found in North America.
