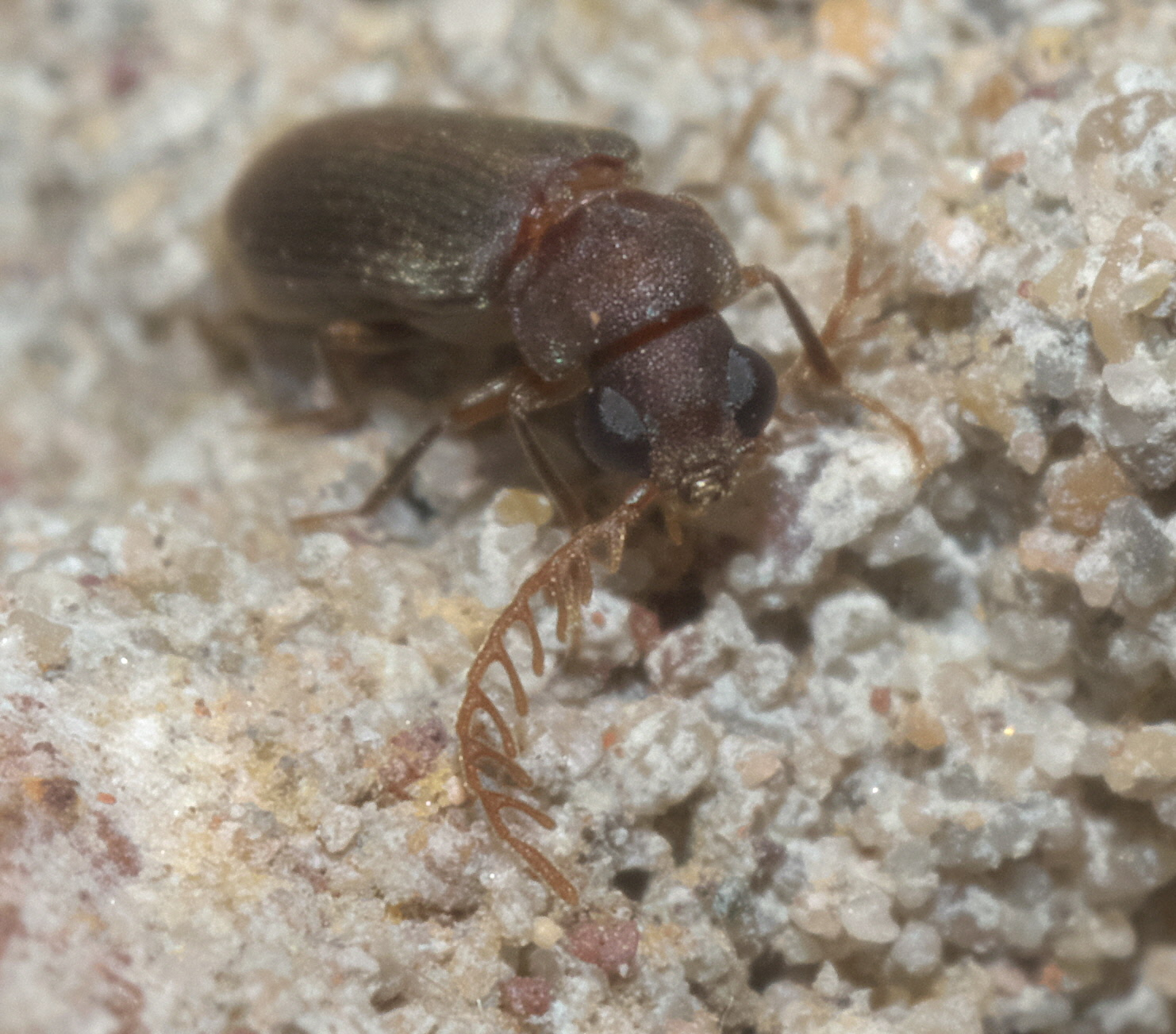

Scientific classification
- Kingdom: Animalia
- Phylum: Arthropoda
- Class: Insecta
- Order: Coleoptera
- Suborder: Polyphaga
- Family: Ptinidae
- Tribe: Euceratocerini
- Genus: Euceratocerus
- Species: E. gibbifrons

Binomial name
- Euceratocerus gibbifrons White, 1960

= Euceratocerus gibbifrons =

Species of beetle

Euceratocerus gibbifrons is a species of death-watch beetle in the family Ptinidae. It is found in North America.

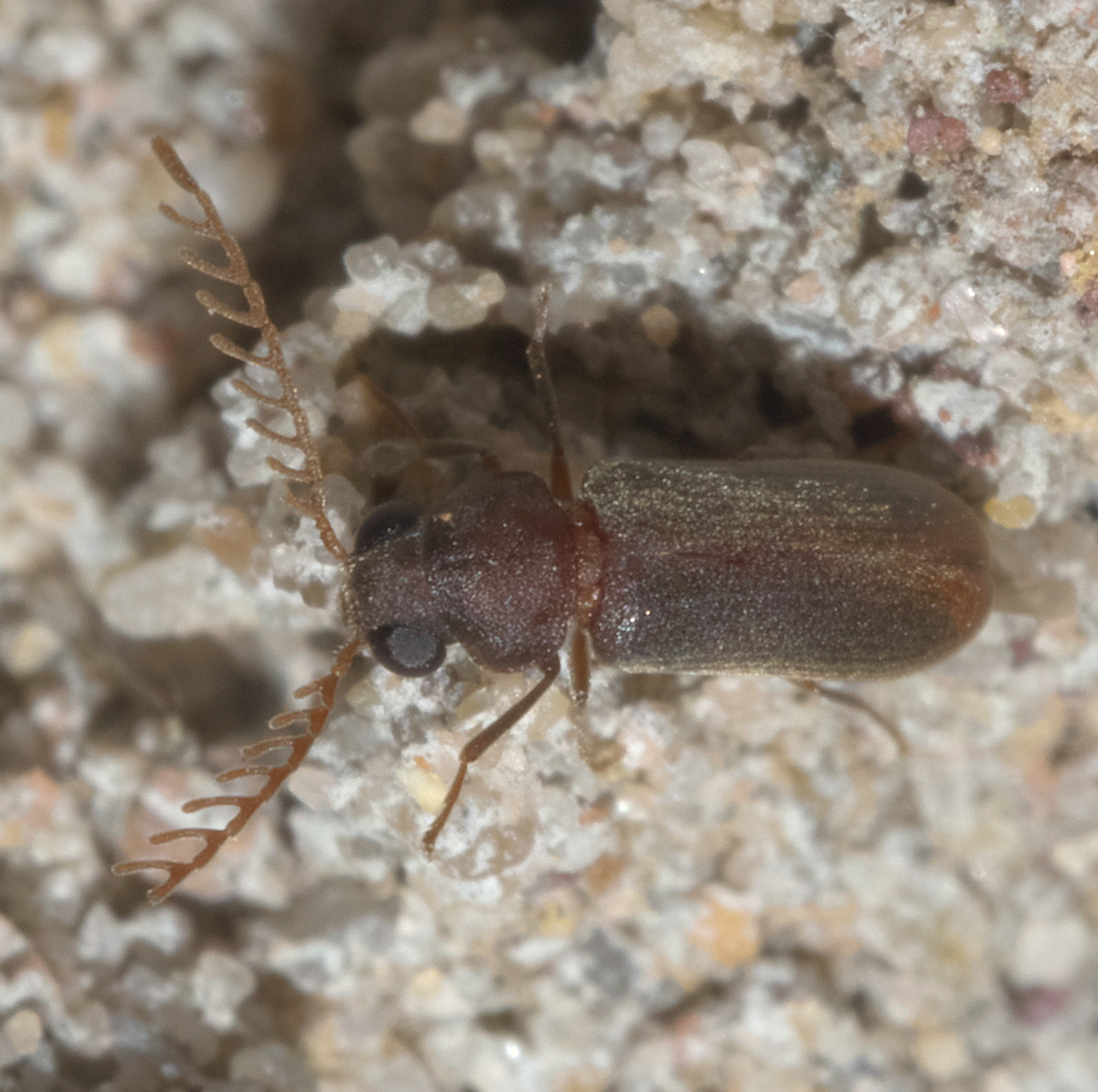
