= Priobium punctatum =

Scientific classification
- Kingdom: Animalia
- Phylum: Arthropoda
- Clade: Pancrustacea
- Class: Insecta
- Order: Coleoptera
- Suborder: Polyphaga
- Family: Ptinidae
- Genus: Priobium
- Species: P. punctatum

Binomial name
- Priobium punctatum (LeConte, 1859)

Species of beetle

Priobium punctatum is a species of death-watch beetle in the family Ptinidae. It is found in North America.
