= Dasytanobium timberkalei =

Scientific classification
- Kingdom: Animalia
- Phylum: Arthropoda
- Class: Insecta
- Order: Coleoptera
- Suborder: Polyphaga
- Family: Ptinidae
- Genus: Dasytanobium
- Species: D. timberkalei

Binomial name
- Dasytanobium timberkalei (Perkins, 1921)

Species of beetle

Dasytanobium timberkalei is a species of beetle in the family Ptinidae.
