= Oligomerus sericans =

Scientific classification
- Kingdom: Animalia
- Phylum: Arthropoda
- Class: Insecta
- Order: Coleoptera
- Suborder: Polyphaga
- Family: Ptinidae
- Tribe: Stegobiini
- Genus: Oligomerus
- Species: O. sericans

Binomial name
- Oligomerus sericans (Melsheimer, 1846)

Species of beetle

Oligomerus sericans is a species of death-watch beetle in the family Ptinidae. It is found in North America.
