= Oligomerus alternans =

Scientific classification
- Kingdom: Animalia
- Phylum: Arthropoda
- Class: Insecta
- Order: Coleoptera
- Suborder: Polyphaga
- Family: Ptinidae
- Genus: Oligomerus
- Species: O. alternans

Binomial name
- Oligomerus alternans LeConte, 1865

Species of beetle

Oligomerus alternans is a species of death-watch beetle in the family Ptinidae. It is found in North America.
