= Actenobius magneoculus =

Scientific classification
- Kingdom: Animalia
- Phylum: Arthropoda
- Clade: Pancrustacea
- Class: Insecta
- Order: Coleoptera
- Suborder: Polyphaga
- Family: Ptinidae
- Genus: Actenobius
- Species: A. magneoculus

Binomial name
- Actenobius magneoculus Peris & al., 2015

Extinct species of beetle

Actenobius magneoculus is an extinct species of anobiid beetle in the family Anobiidae.
