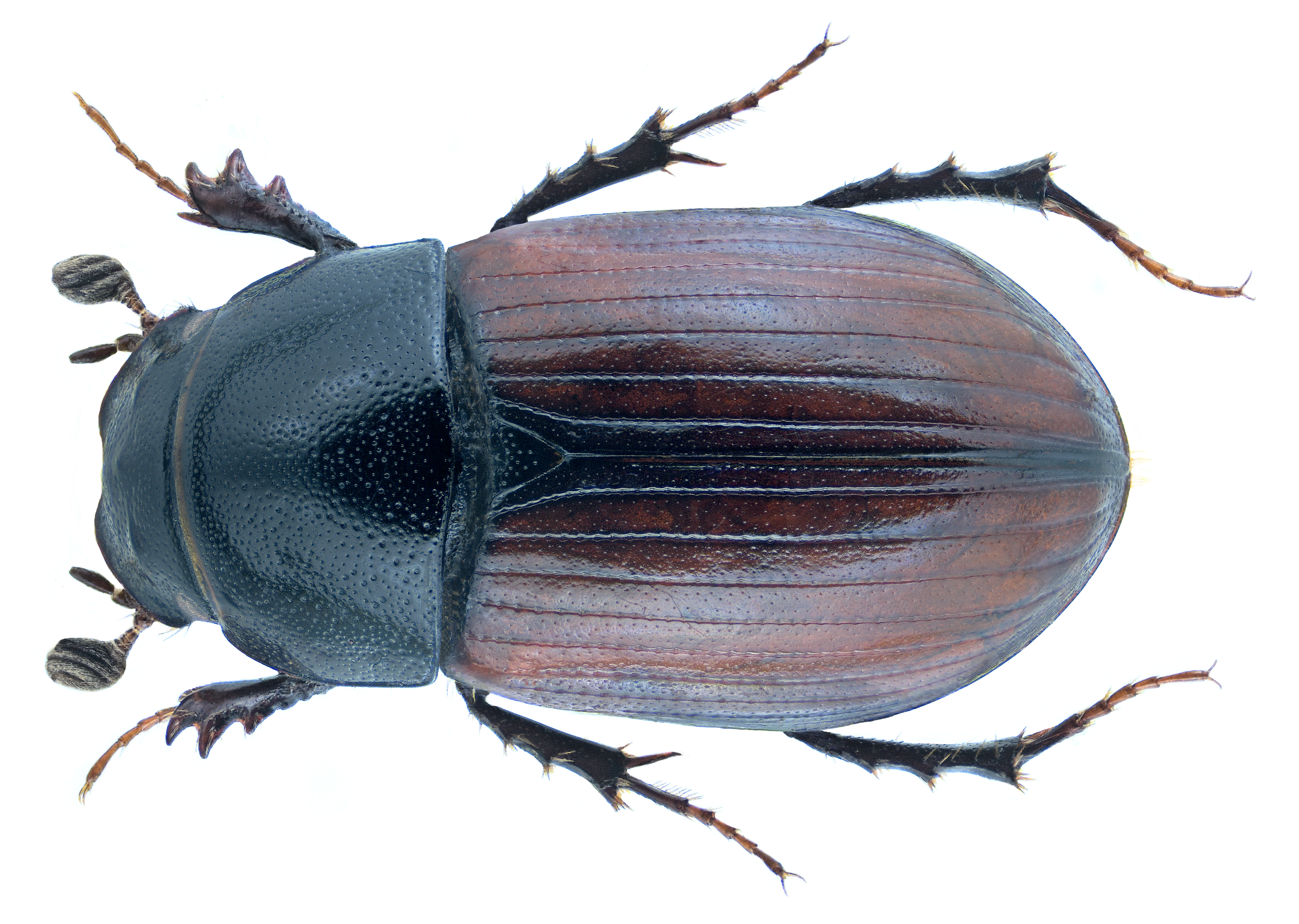
- Oromus alpinus, Switzerland

Scientific classification
- Kingdom: Animalia
- Phylum: Arthropoda
- Clade: Pancrustacea
- Class: Insecta
- Order: Coleoptera
- Suborder: Polyphaga
- Infraorder: Scarabaeiformia
- Family: Scarabaeidae
- Subfamily: Aphodiinae
- Tribe: Aphodiini
- Genus: Oromus; Mulsant and Rey, 1869

Synonyms
- Aphodius (Oromus) Mulsant & Rey, 1870

= Oromus =

Genus of beetles

Oromus is a genus of scarab beetles in the family Scarabaeidae. There are at least two described species in Oromus, found in the Palearctic.

== Species ==
These two species belong to the genus Oromus:

- Oromus alpinus (Scopoli, 1763)
- Oromus tragicus (Schmidt, 1920)
