= Anobium inexspectatum =

Scientific classification
- Kingdom: Animalia
- Phylum: Arthropoda
- Class: Insecta
- Order: Coleoptera
- Suborder: Polyphaga
- Family: Ptinidae
- Genus: Anobium
- Species: A. inexspectatum

Binomial name
- Anobium inexspectatum Lohse, 1954

Species of beetle

Anobium inexspectatum is a species of beetle in the family Ptinidae. It is native to Europe, its distribution extending to Azerbaijan. The larvae are found only on common ivy (Hedera helix).
