= Alvarenganiellinae =

Scientific classification
- Kingdom: Animalia
- Phylum: Arthropoda
- Class: Insecta
- Order: Coleoptera
- Suborder: Polyphaga
- Superfamily: Bostrichoidea
- Family: Ptinidae
- Subfamily: Alvarenganiellinae; Viana and Martinez, 1971

Subfamily of beetles

Alvarenganiellinae is a subfamily of beetles in the family Ptinidae. There is at least one genus, Dasytanobium, in Alvarenganiellinae.

The subfamily Alvarenganiellinae, along with Anobiinae and several others, were formerly considered members of the family Anobiidae, the but family name has since been changed to Ptinidae.
