= Xeranobium =

Scientific classification
- Kingdom: Animalia
- Phylum: Arthropoda
- Class: Insecta
- Order: Coleoptera
- Suborder: Polyphaga
- Family: Ptinidae
- Subfamily: Anobiinae
- Tribe: Euceratocerini
- Genus: Xeranobium; Fall, 1905

Genus of beetles

Xeranobium is a genus of death-watch beetles in the family Ptinidae. There are about 13 described species in Xeranobium.

== Species ==
These 13 species belong to the genus Xeranobium:

- Xeranobium badium White, 1971
- Xeranobium californicum White, 1971
- Xeranobium cinereum (Horn, 1894)
- Xeranobium costatum White, 1971
- Xeranobium desertum Fall, 1905
- Xeranobium griseum White, 1971
- Xeranobium laticeps Fall, 1905
- Xeranobium macrum Fall, 1905
- Xeranobium oregonum Hatch, 1961
- Xeranobium parvum White, 1971
- Xeranobium poliotrichum White, 1971
- Xeranobium rufescens White, 1971
- Xeranobium sericatum White, 1971
