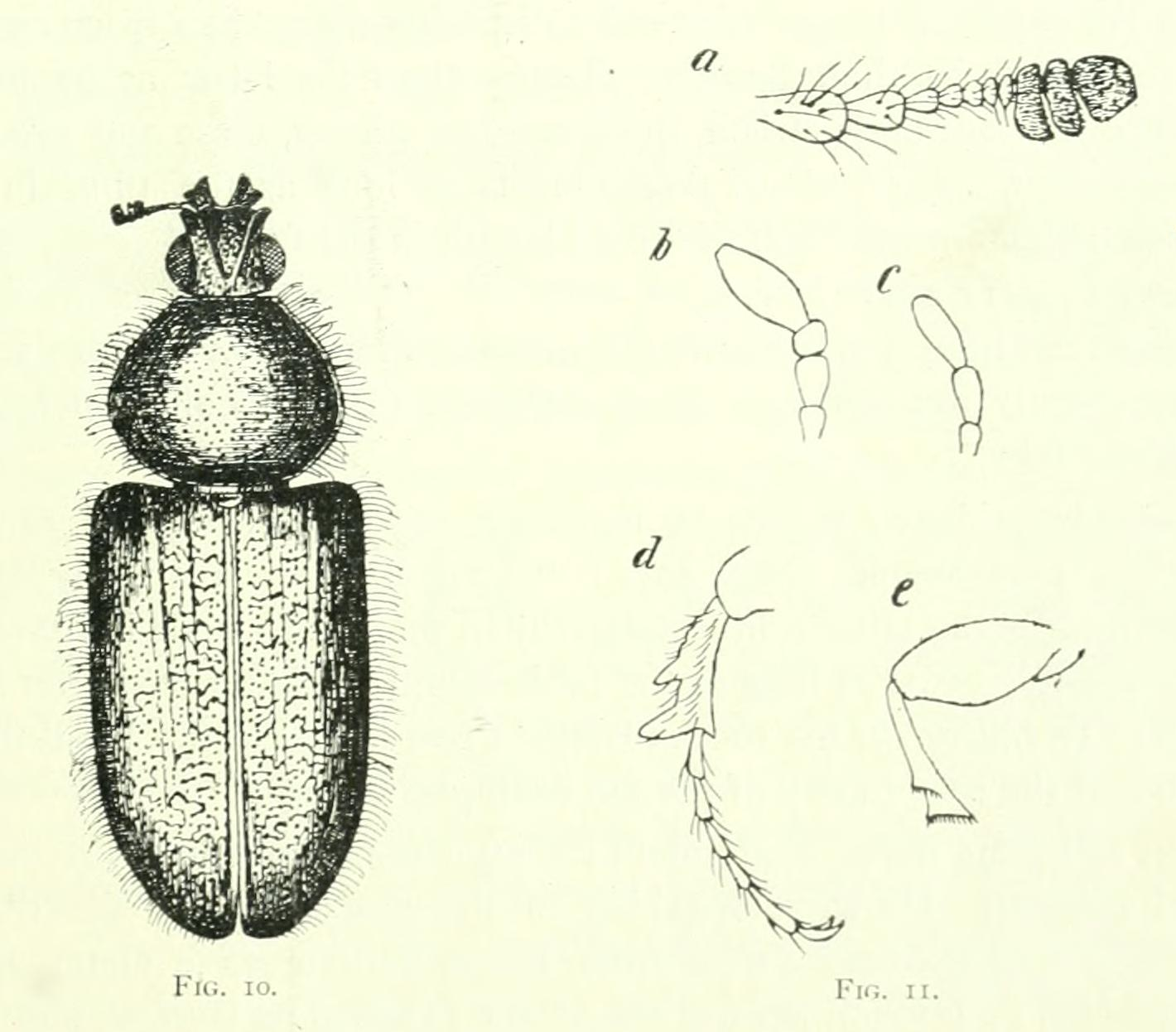
- Illustration of Diphyllostoma fimbriatum (left), and its antenna (a), maxillary palpus (b), labial palpus (c), front tibia and tarsus (d), and hind femur and tibia (e)

Scientific classification
- Kingdom: Animalia
- Phylum: Arthropoda
- Class: Insecta
- Order: Coleoptera
- Suborder: Polyphaga
- Infraorder: Scarabaeiformia
- Superfamily: Scarabaeoidea
- Family: Diphyllostomatidae; Holloway, 1972
- Genus: Diphyllostoma; Fall, 1901

Species
- see text

= False stag beetle =

Genus of beetles

The false stag beetles (Diphyllostoma) are a group of three species of rare beetles known only from California. Almost nothing is known of their life history beyond that the adults are diurnal and females are flightless; larvae have not been observed.

Their length ranges from 5 to 9 mm; bodies are elongate, with a generally dull brown to reddish-brown color. Both body and legs are covered with longish hairs.

Originally classed with the Lucanidae, Diphyllostoma have a number of characteristics not shared with any other type of stag beetle, and so in 1972 Holloway proposed a separate family Diphyllostomatidae, which has since been accepted.

A possible close relative has been reported from mid-Cretaceous aged Burmese amber in Myanmar, dating to around 100 million years ago.

== Species ==
- Diphyllostoma fimbriatum (Fall, 1901)
- Diphyllostoma linsleyi Fall, 1932
- Diphyllostoma nigricolle Fall, 1912
