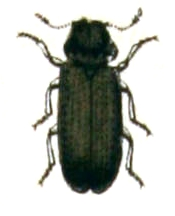
- Oligomerus brunneus

Scientific classification
- Kingdom: Animalia
- Phylum: Arthropoda
- Class: Insecta
- Order: Coleoptera
- Suborder: Polyphaga
- Superfamily: Bostrichoidea
- Family: Ptinidae
- Subfamily: Anobiinae
- Tribe: Stegobiini
- Genus: Oligomerus; Redtenbacher, 1849

= Oligomerus =

Genus of beetles

Oligomerus is a genus of death-watch beetles in the family Ptinidae. There are about 18 described species in Oligomerus.

== Identification ==
It leaves a round hole behind, which is one to three millimeters in diameter. The boreholes are filled with loose bore dust.

== Species ==
These 18 species belong to the genus Oligomerus:

- Oligomerus alternans LeConte, 1865^{i c g b}
- Oligomerus angusticollis White, 1976^{i c g}
- Oligomerus brevipilis Fall, 1905^{i c g}
- Oligomerus brunneus (Olivier, 1790)^{g}
- Oligomerus californicus Fall, 1905^{i c g}
- Oligomerus crestonensis Hatch, 1961^{i c g}
- Oligomerus cylindricus White, 1976^{i c g}
- Oligomerus delicatulus (Fall, 1920)^{i c g}
- Oligomerus disruptus (Baudi di Selve, 1874)^{g}
- Oligomerus enervatus White, 1976^{i c g}
- Oligomerus grossus White, 1976^{i c g}
- Oligomerus obtusus LeConte, 1865^{i c g}
- Oligomerus priapus White, 1976^{i c g}
- Oligomerus ptilinoides (Wollaston, 1854)^{g}
- Oligomerus retowskii Schilsky, 1898^{g}
- Oligomerus sericans (Melsheimer, 1846)^{i c g b}
- Oligomerus tenellus Fall, 1905^{i c g}
- Oligomerus texanus White, 1976^{i c g}

Data sources: i = ITIS, c = Catalogue of Life, g = GBIF, b = Bugguide.net
