= Dasytanobium =

Scientific classification
- Kingdom: Animalia
- Phylum: Arthropoda
- Class: Insecta
- Order: Coleoptera
- Suborder: Polyphaga
- Family: Ptinidae
- Subfamily: Alvarenganiellinae
- Genus: Dasytanobium; Pic, 1902

Genus of beetles

Dasytanobium is a genus of beetles in the family Ptinidae. There is at least one described species in Dasytanobium, D. timberkalei.
