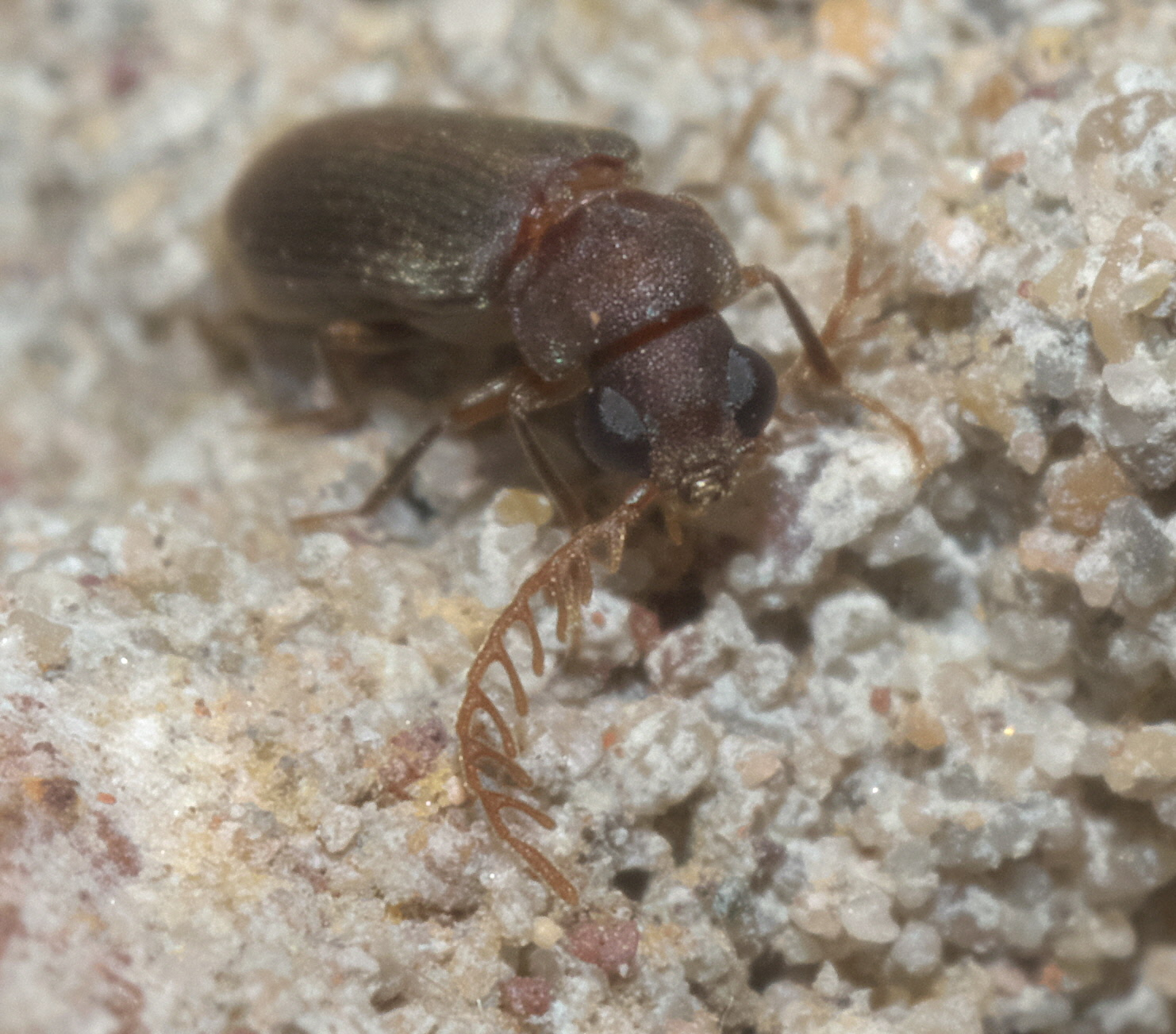
- Euceratocerus gibbifrons

Scientific classification
- Kingdom: Animalia
- Phylum: Arthropoda
- Class: Insecta
- Order: Coleoptera
- Suborder: Polyphaga
- Family: Ptinidae
- Tribe: Euceratocerini
- Genus: Euceratocerus; LeConte, 1874

= Euceratocerus =

Genus of beetles

Euceratocerus is a genus of death-watch beetles in the family Ptinidae. There are four described species in Euceratocerus.

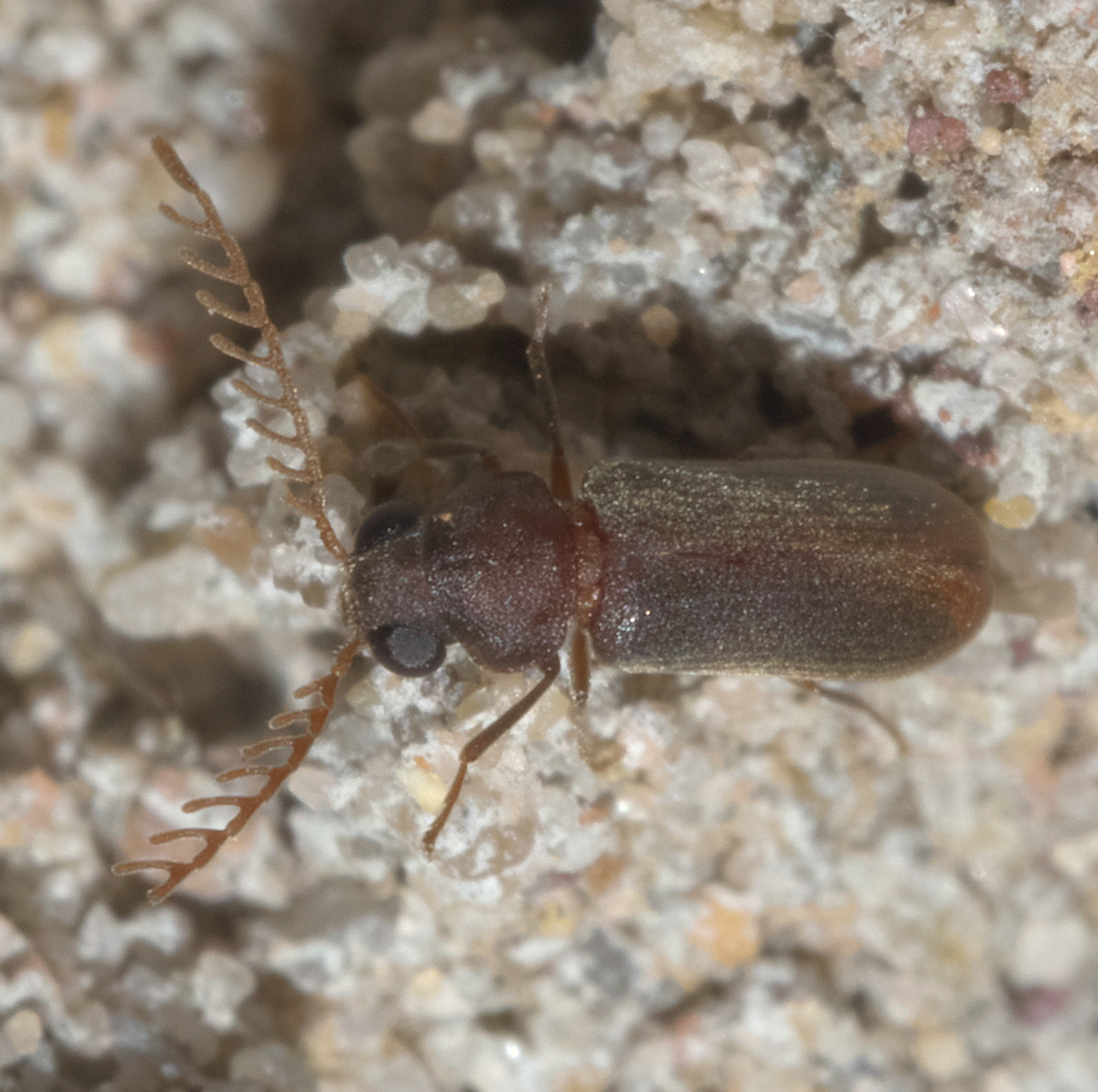
Euceratocerus gibbifrons

== Species ==
These four species belong to the genus Euceratocerus:

- Euceratocerus gibbifrons White, 1960^{i c g b}
- Euceratocerus hornii LeConte, 1874^{i c g}
- Euceratocerus parvus White, 1974^{i c g b}
- Euceratocerus argenteus White, 1975^{i c g b}

Data sources: i = ITIS, c = Catalogue of Life, g = GBIF, b = Bugguide.net
