= Platybregmus =

Scientific classification
- Kingdom: Animalia
- Phylum: Arthropoda
- Class: Insecta
- Order: Coleoptera
- Suborder: Polyphaga
- Family: Ptinidae
- Tribe: Anobiini
- Genus: Platybregmus; Fisher, 1934

Genus of beetles

Platybregmus is a genus of death-watch beetles in the family Ptinidae. There is at least one described species in Platybregmus, P. canadensis.
