= Diphyllostoma fimbriatum =

Scientific classification
- Domain: Eukaryota
- Kingdom: Animalia
- Phylum: Arthropoda
- Class: Insecta
- Order: Coleoptera
- Suborder: Polyphaga
- Infraorder: Scarabaeiformia
- Family: Diphyllostomatidae
- Genus: Diphyllostoma
- Species: D. fimbriatum

Binomial name
- Diphyllostoma fimbriatum (Fall, 1901)

Species of beetle

Diphyllostoma fimbriatum is a species of false stag beetle in the family Diphyllostomatidae.
