= Ctenobium =

Scientific classification
- Kingdom: Animalia
- Phylum: Arthropoda
- Class: Insecta
- Order: Coleoptera
- Suborder: Polyphaga
- Family: Ptinidae
- Tribe: Euceratocerini
- Genus: Ctenobium; LeConte, 1865

Genus of beetles

Ctenobium is a genus of death-watch beetles in the family Ptinidae. There is at least one described species in Ctenobium, C. antennatum.
