= Anatole Auguste Boieldieu =

French entomologist

Anatole Auguste Boieldieu (1824 – 29 May 1886 in Chevilly-Larue) was a French entomologist who specialised in Coleoptera. He was a member of the Société entomologique de France. His collection is conserved by the Association des Etudiants Paris Boieldieu wrote many short and some longer scientific papers in which he described new taxa. Two important papers are

- Quelques Coléoptères nouveaux des Iles d'Eubée et Baléares. Annales de la Société Entomologique de France (4) 5:5-12.(1865) ...
- 1859. Descriptions des espèces. nouvelles des Coléoptères. Annales de la Société Entomologique de France 7: 475–582. (1859).
