= Colposternus =

Scientific classification
- Kingdom: Animalia
- Phylum: Arthropoda
- Class: Insecta
- Order: Coleoptera
- Suborder: Polyphaga
- Family: Ptinidae
- Subfamily: Anobiinae
- Genus: Colposternus; Fall, 1905-01

Genus of beetles

Colposternus is a genus of beetles in the family Ptinidae. There is at least one described species in Colposternus, C. tenuilineatus.
