= Actenobius =

Scientific classification
- Kingdom: Animalia
- Phylum: Arthropoda
- Class: Insecta
- Order: Coleoptera
- Suborder: Polyphaga
- Family: Ptinidae
- Tribe: Euceratocerini
- Genus: Actenobius; Fall, 1905

Genus of beetles

Actenobius is a genus of beetles in the family Ptinidae. It contains two species, one extinct, Actenobius magneoculus, and one extant species, Actenobius pleuralis.

A fossil of Actenobius magneoculus was discovered in Spain in 2015. Actenobius pleuralis was described by T.L. Casey in 1898.

== Genera ==
These two species belong to the genus Actenobius:

- Actenobius pleuralis (Casey, 1898)
- Actenobius magneoculus Peris & al., 2015
