= Epauloecus =

Scientific classification
- Kingdom: Animalia
- Phylum: Arthropoda
- Class: Insecta
- Order: Coleoptera
- Suborder: Polyphaga
- Family: Ptinidae
- Genus: Epauloecus; Mulsant & Rey, 1868

Genus of beetles

Epauloecus is a genus of beetles belonging to the family Ptinidae.

Species:

- Epauloecus unicolor (Piller & Mitterpacher, 1783)
