= Pierre Nicolas Camille Jacquelin du Val =

French entomologist (1828–1862)

Pierre Nicolas Camille Jacquelin Du Val (28 July 1828, Prades, Pyrénées-Orientales – 5 July 1862, Clamart) was a French entomologist who specialised in Coleoptera.

Jacquelin was born in Prades, Pyrénées-Orientales, and was in poor health from age five. After he went to Paris in order to begin medical studies in 1849, he met Alexandre Laboulbène, who introduced him to entomology. Laboulbène became a famous physician, and Jacquelin left medicine to concentrate on entomology. In 1850, he published his first paper on entomology. After minor preliminary works, he conceived together with the miniaturist painter Jules Migneaux (1825–1898) a vast project describing and illustrating all European genera of beetles. There was the Genera des coléoptères d’Europe, which started to get published in 1854, one of the most remarkable European book on beetles, due to the quality of its text, and especially to its magnificent illustrations, whose beauty and accuracy were never surpassed. He died at 34, leaving unfinished his work which was brought to an end by the prolific author Léon Fairmaire (1820–1906). In addition, he founded the journal Glanures entomologiques (2 volumes, 1859–1860), to accommodate some smaller contributions he could not introduce in his great Genera.

== Attributions ==
The families Byturidae in 1858 and the genus Aubeonymus (Curculioninae) in 1855.

== Works ==
Partial list

- Jacquelin du Val, P. N. C. & P. Lareynie. Quelques observations sur les Coléoptères des environs de Montpellier. Annales de la Société Entomologique de France (2) 10:719-735(1852).
- Description de deux genres nouveaux et de plusieurs especes nouvelles. Annales de la Société Entomologique de France ser. 2, 10: 695-718 (1852).
- Manuel entomologique. Genera des coléoptères d'Europe comprenant leur classification en familles naturelles, la description de tous les genres, des tableaux synoptiques destinés à faciliter l'étude, le catalogue de toutes les espèces, de nombreux dessins au trait de caractères et plus de treize cents types représentant un ou plusieurs insectes de chaque genre dessinés et peints d'après nature avec le plus grand soin par M. Jules Migneaux. Paris: Migneaux, later Deyrolle (1854-1868). The parts are, I (1854-1857): 468 pp.+ 93 pl., II (1858-1859): 83 pp.+ 77 pl., III (1860-1868): 100 pl., IV (1868): III + 295 pp., Atlas (1868): 78 pl., Catalogue (1868): 284 pp.
- Insectes. Ordre des coléoptères. In: Ramon de la Sagra, Histoire fisica, politica y natural de la Isla de Cuba 7:1-136. (1857)
