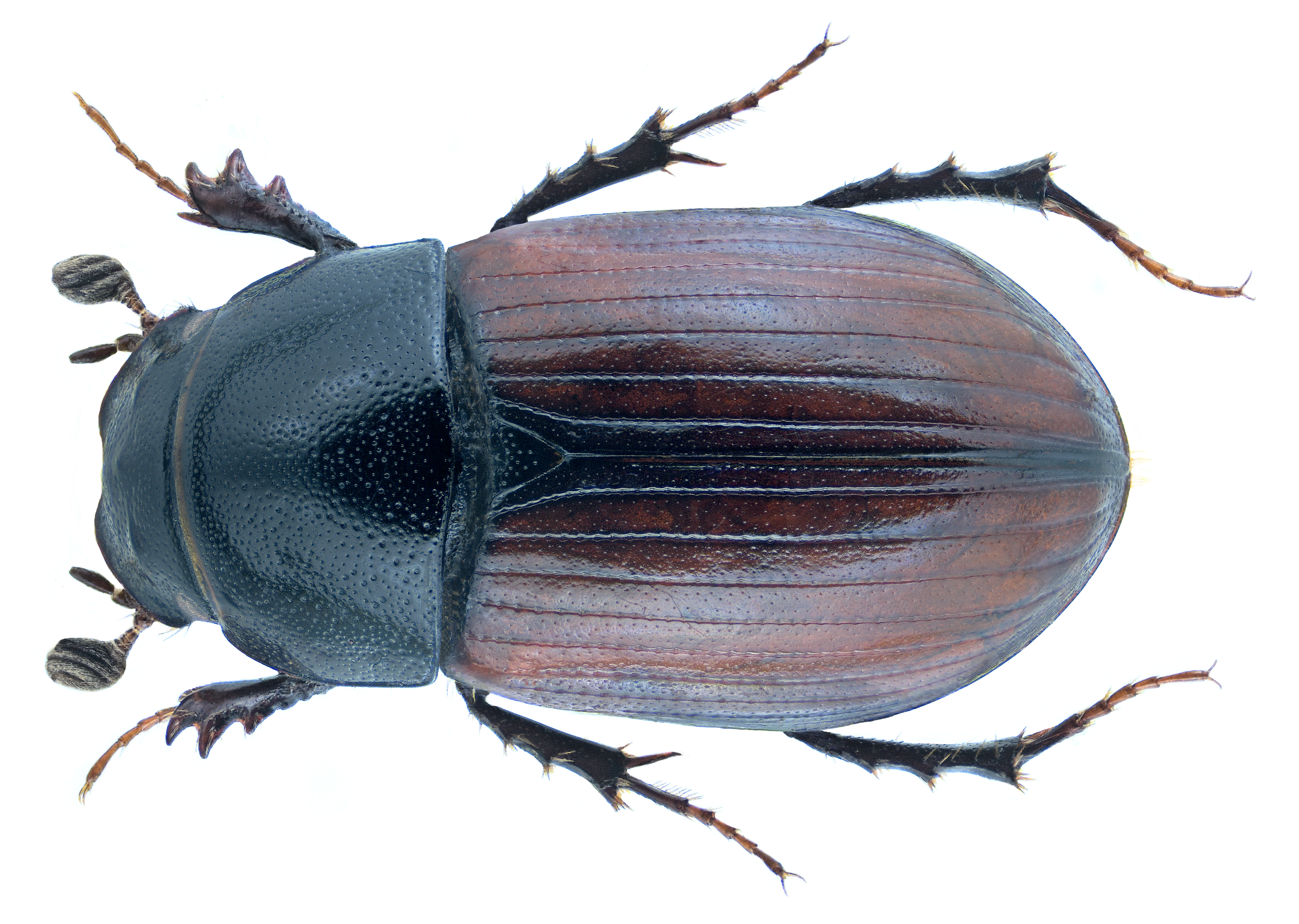

Scientific classification
- Kingdom: Animalia
- Phylum: Arthropoda
- Clade: Pancrustacea
- Class: Insecta
- Order: Coleoptera
- Suborder: Polyphaga
- Infraorder: Scarabaeiformia
- Family: Scarabaeidae
- Genus: Oromus
- Species: O. alpinus

Binomial name
- Oromus alpinus (Scopoli, 1763)

Synonyms
- Scarabaeus alpinus Scopoli, 1763; Aphodius picescens Fairmaire, 1903; Aphodius alpinus mulsanti Dalla Torre, 1879; Aphodius alpinus nigerrimus Dalla Torre, 1879; Aphodius festinans Gistel, 1857; Aphodius onthobius Gistel, 1857; Aphodius turficola Gistel, 1857; Aphodius subalpinus ericetorum Hardy, 1847; Aphodius rubens carthusianus Mulsant, 1842; Aphodius rubens rupicola Mulsant, 1842; Aphodius alpestris Heer, 1841; Aphodius schmidti Heer, 1841; Aphodius constans Schmidt, 1840; Aphodius dilatatus Schmidt, 1840; Aphodius lapponicus Villa, 1833; Aphodius rubens Dejean, 1833

= Oromus alpinus =

Species of beetle

Oromus alpinus is a species of beetle of the family Scarabaeidae. It is found in Austria, Belgium, Bosnia and Herzegovina, Croatia, the Czech Republic, France, Germany, Greece, Italy, Lithuania, Poland, Romania, Slovenia, Spain, Switzerland and Ukraine.

== Description ==
Adults reach a length of about 5–6 mm (0.20–0.24 in). They have an oblong, convex, shiny, glabrous, blackish body, with the elytra reddish apically.
