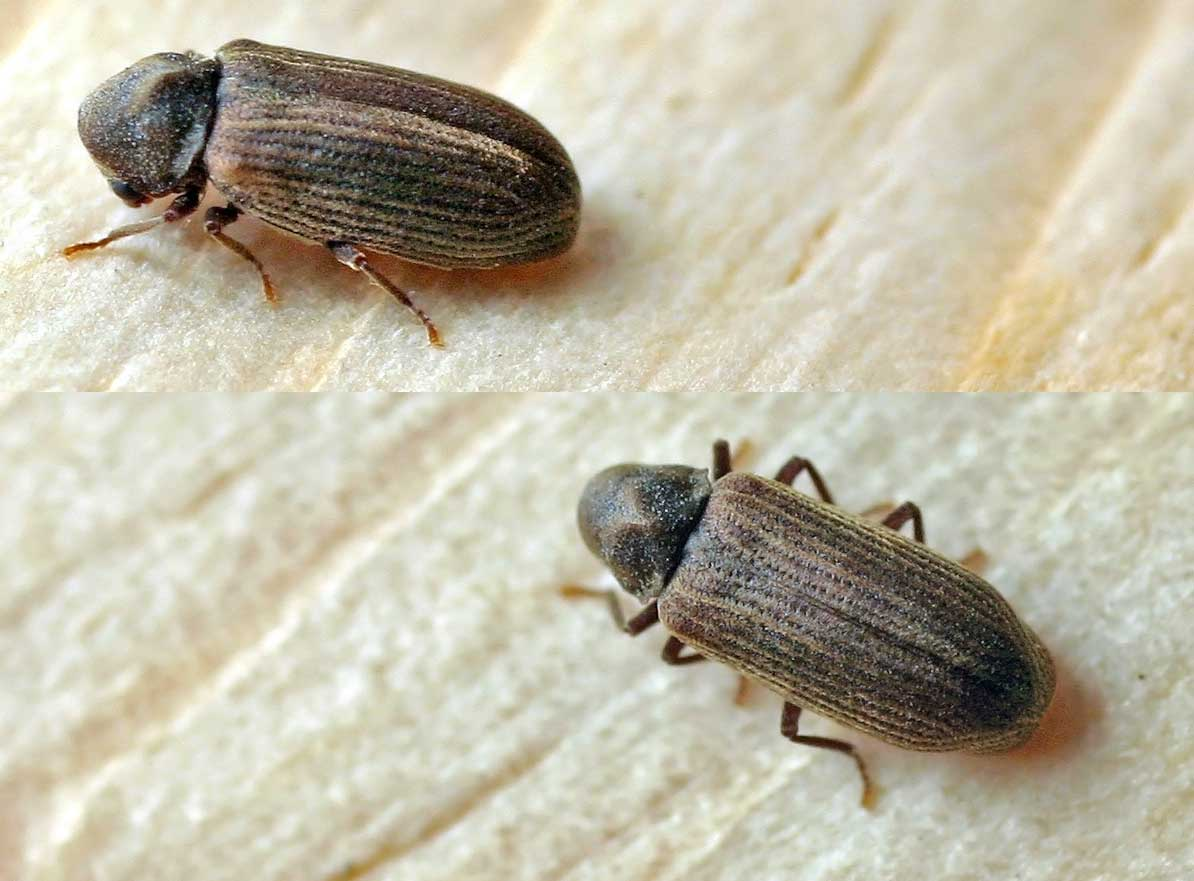

Conservation status
- Least Concern (IUCN 3.1)

Scientific classification
- Kingdom: Animalia
- Phylum: Arthropoda
- Clade: Pancrustacea
- Class: Insecta
- Order: Coleoptera
- Suborder: Polyphaga
- Family: Ptinidae
- Subfamily: Anobiinae
- Tribe: Anobiini
- Genus: Anobium
- Species: A. punctatum

Binomial name
- Anobium punctatum De Geer, 1774

= Common furniture beetle =

Species of beetle

The common furniture beetle or common house borer (Anobium punctatum) is a woodboring beetle originally from Europe but now distributed worldwide. In the larval stage it bores in wood and feeds upon it. Adult Anobium punctatum measure 2.7–4.5 millimetres (0.11–0.18 in) in length. They have brown ellipsoidal bodies with a prothorax resembling a monk's cowl.

The common furniture beetle is often confused with the drugstore beetle and cigarette beetle due to their similar appearance.

== Life cycle ==
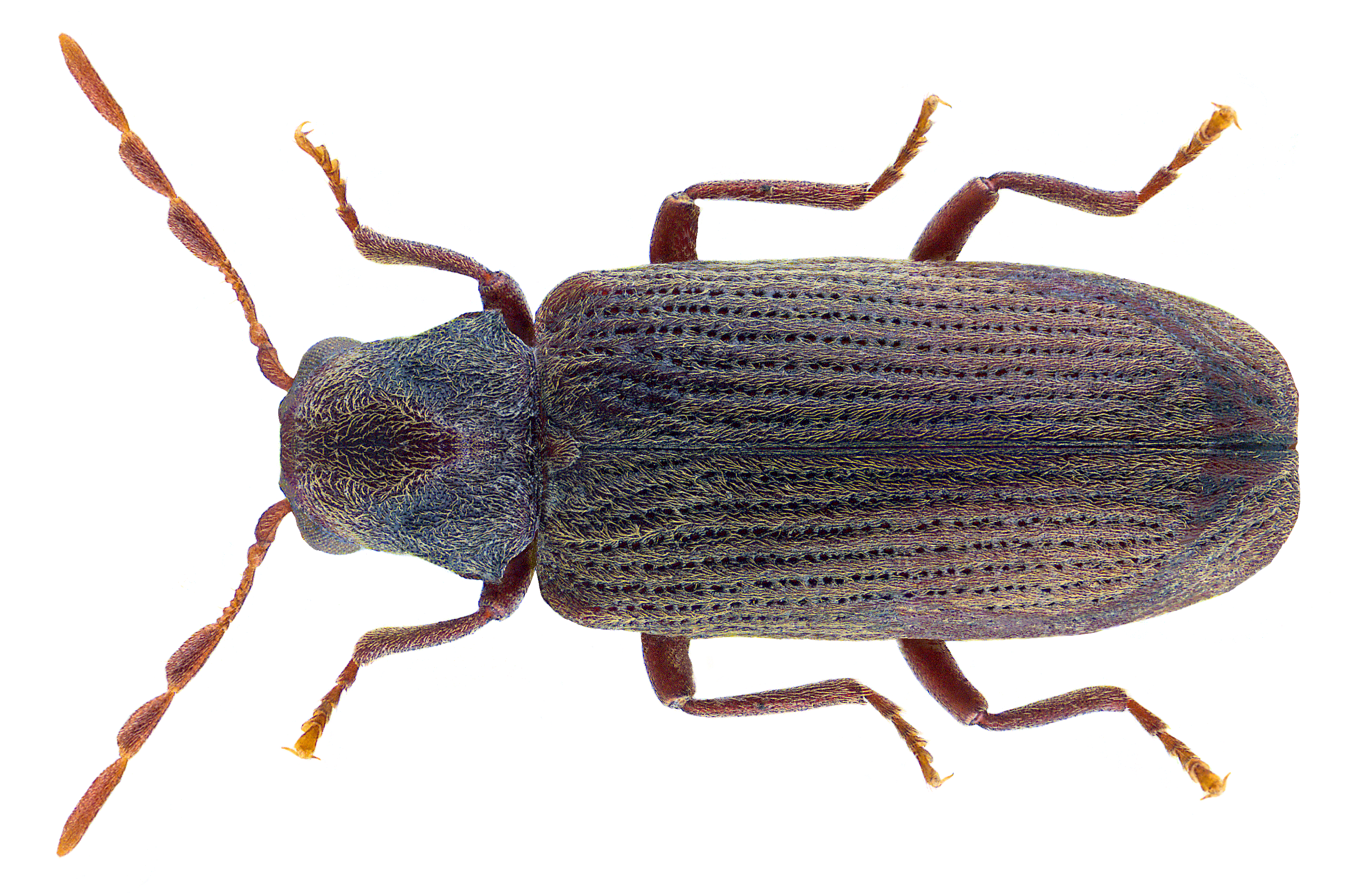

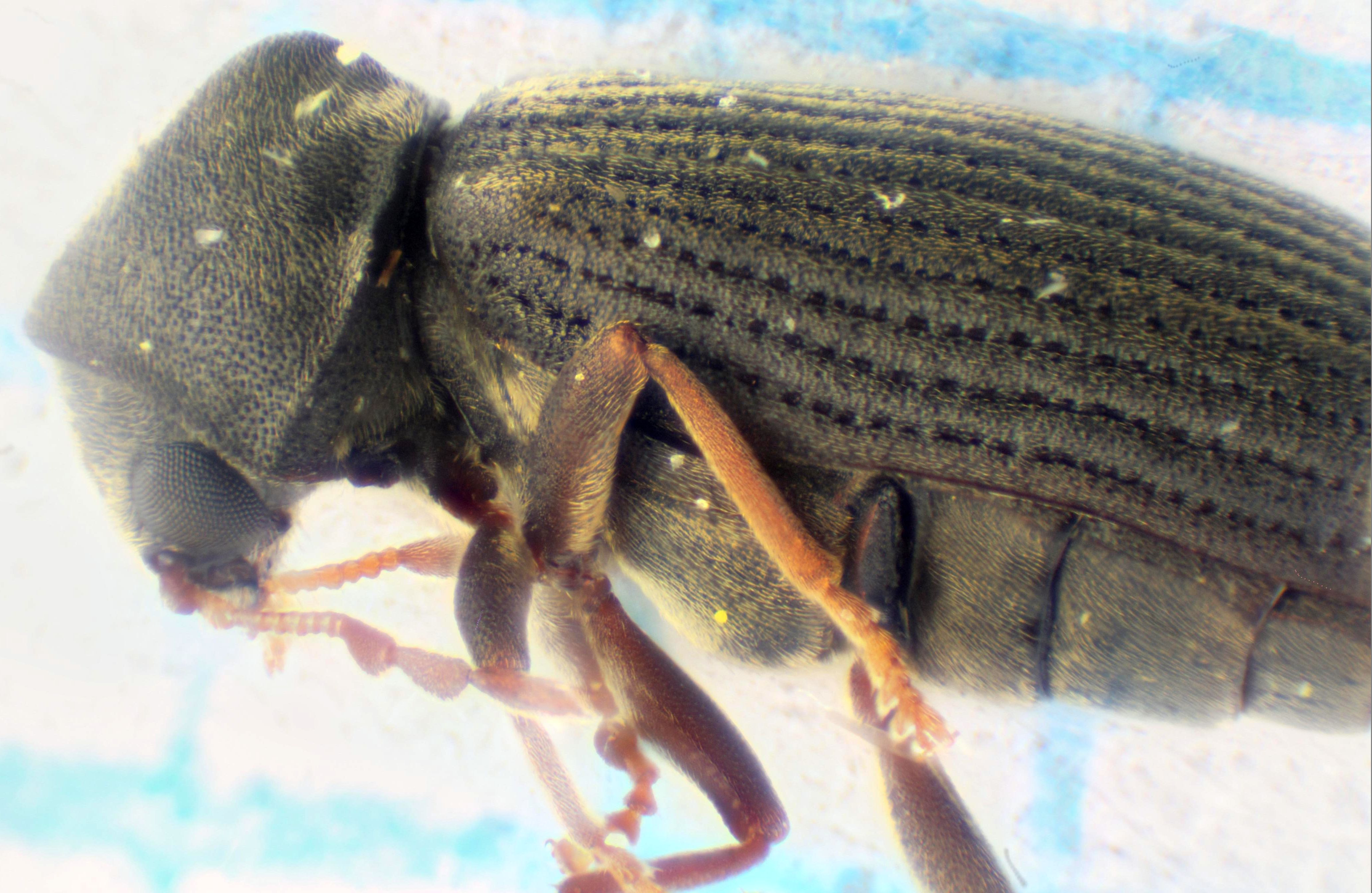

The female lays her eggs in cracks in wood or inside old exit holes, if available. The eggs hatch after some three weeks, each producing a 1 millimetre (0.039 in) long, creamy white, C-shaped larva. For three to four years the larvae bore semi-randomly through timber, following and eating the starchy part of the wood grain, and grow up to 7 millimetres (0.28 in). They come nearer to the wood surface when ready to pupate. They excavate small spaces just under the wood surface and take up to eight weeks to pupate. The adults then break through the surface, making a 1 mm to 1.5 millimetres (0.059 in) exit hole and spilling dust, the first visible signs of an infestation. After they emerge, the adults do not feed; they find mates, reproduce, and die.

== Pest control ==
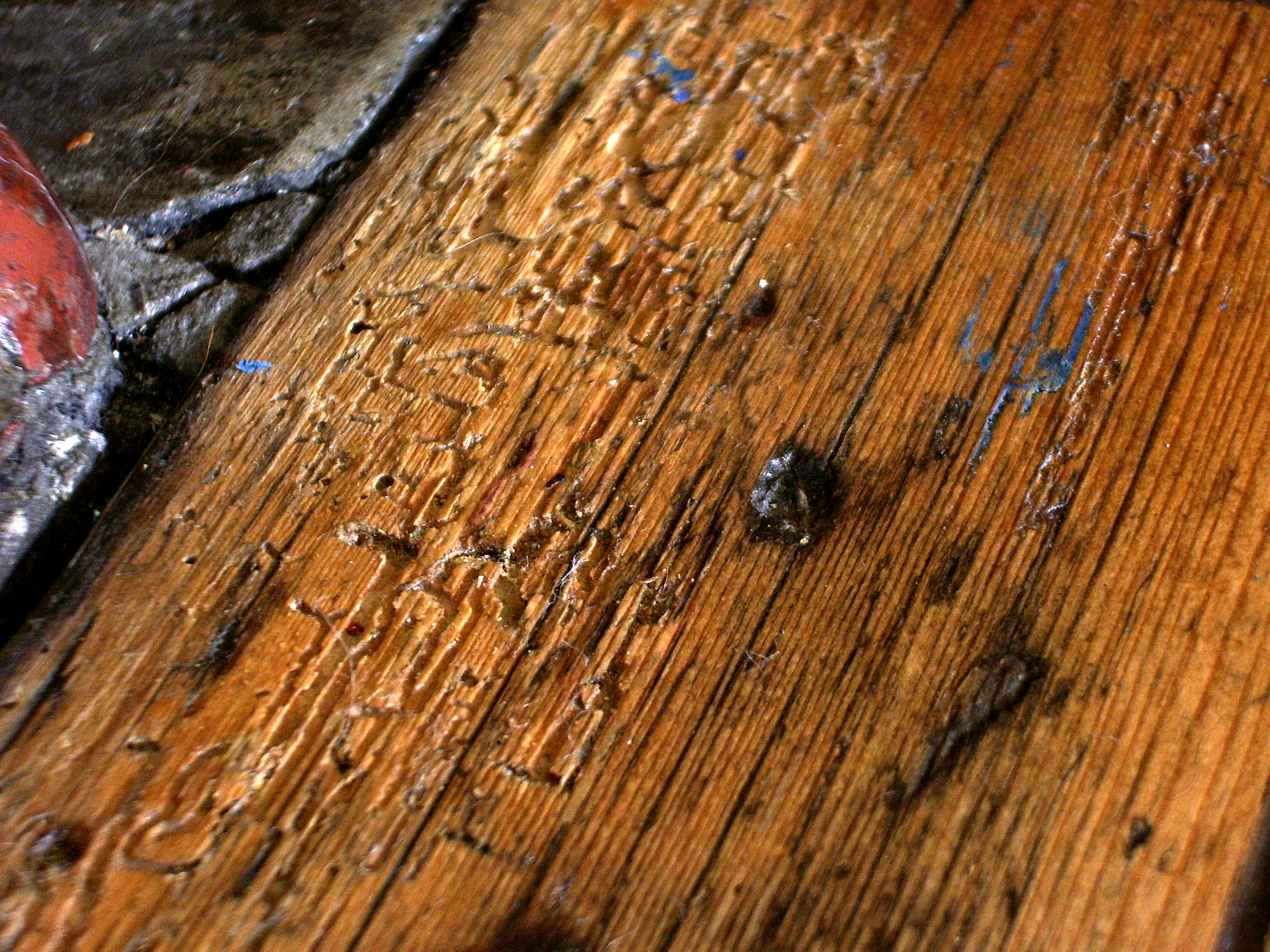
Woodworm holes and burrows exposed in wooden floorboard

The first step in pest control is prevention. Particularly important in this respect is to keep the timber dry - below 16% moisture content. A relative humidity within the building above 60% may lead to an infestation, and timber moisture content below 12% is too dry for an infection to occur. Anobium punctatum normally only attacks seasoned sapwood timber, not live or fresh wood. Also, it usually does not attack heartwood timbers. This is readily observed from infested structures, where one piece of timber may be heavily attacked but an adjacent one left virtually untouched according to whether it is made from the heartwood or the sapwood part of a tree trunk. Infestations are also usually a problem of old wooden houses built with untreated timbers. Some building regulations state that timbers with more than 25% sapwood may not be used, so that wood borer infections cannot substantially weaken structures.

Infection, past or present, is diagnosed by small round exit holes of 1 to 1.5 mm diameter. Active infections feature the appearance of new exit holes and fine wood dust around the holes.

Because of the 3–4 year life cycle of Anobium punctatum, timber or timber products bought containing an A. punctatum infection may not manifest holes until years after the timber has been acquired. Infestation can be controlled by application of a residual insecticide (such as permethrin) to infected areas, by professional fumigation, or by replacing infected timber . Simple aerosol insecticide sprays will only kill the adult borer on the wing but not the burrowing larvae, which remain relatively protected inside infected timbers. Freezing infected timber, or heating to 50 °C for a day or more, will kill beetle larvae, but offer no residual protection.

== See also ==
- Woodworm
