= Nicobium (beetle) =

Scientific classification
- Kingdom: Animalia
- Phylum: Arthropoda
- Class: Insecta
- Order: Coleoptera
- Suborder: Polyphaga
- Family: Ptinidae
- Tribe: Nicobiini
- Genus: Nicobium; LeConte, 1861

Synonyms
- Neobium Mulsant and Rey, 1864

Genus of beetles

Nicobium is a genus of death-watch beetles in the family Ptinidae. There are about five described species in Nicobium.

== Species ==
These five species belong to the genus Nicobium:

- Nicobium castaneum (Olivier, 1790)^{i c g b}
- Nicobium schneideri Reitter, 1878^{g}
- Nicobium velatum (Wollaston, 1854)^{g}
- Nicobium villosum (Brulle, 1838)^{g}
- Nicobium zuzartei Bercedo & Arnáiz, 2007^{g}

Data sources: i = ITIS, c = Catalogue of Life, g = GBIF, b = Bugguide.net
