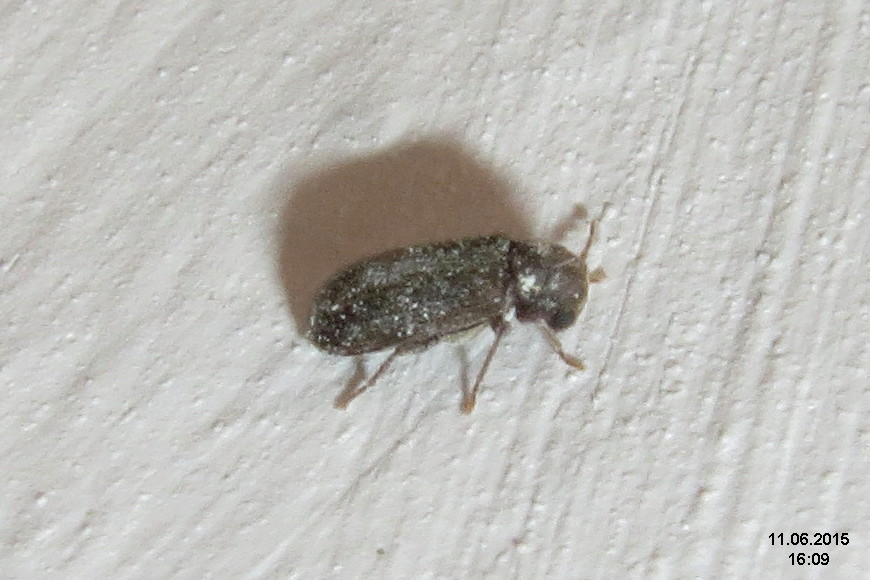
- Anobium

Scientific classification
- Kingdom: Animalia
- Phylum: Arthropoda
- Class: Insecta
- Order: Coleoptera
- Suborder: Polyphaga
- Family: Ptinidae
- Tribe: Anobiini
- Genus: Anobium; Fabricius, 1775

Synonyms
- Hemicoelinum Español, 1971

= Anobium =

Anobium Temporal range: Eocene–Recent

Genus of beetles

Anobium is a genus of beetles in the family Ptinidae. There are about seven extant and five extinct species in Anobium.

== Species ==
These 10 species belong to the genus Anobium:

- Anobium cymoreki Espaol, 1963^{g}
- Anobium excavatum Kugelann, 1792^{g}
- Anobium fulvicorne Sturm, 1837^{g}
- Anobium hederae Ihssen, 1949^{g}
- Anobium inexspectatum Lohse, 1954^{g}
- Anobium nitidum Fabricius, 1792^{g}
- Anobium punctatum (De Geer, 1774)^{i c g b} (common furniture beetle)
- †Anobium deceptum Scudder, 1878^{g}
- †Anobium durescens Scudder, 1900^{g}
- †Anobium lignitum Scudder, 1878^{g}
- †Anobium ovale Scudder, 1878^{g}
- †Anobium sucinoemarginatum (Kuska, 1992)^{g}

Data sources: i = ITIS, c = Catalogue of Life, g = GBIF, b = Bugguide.net
