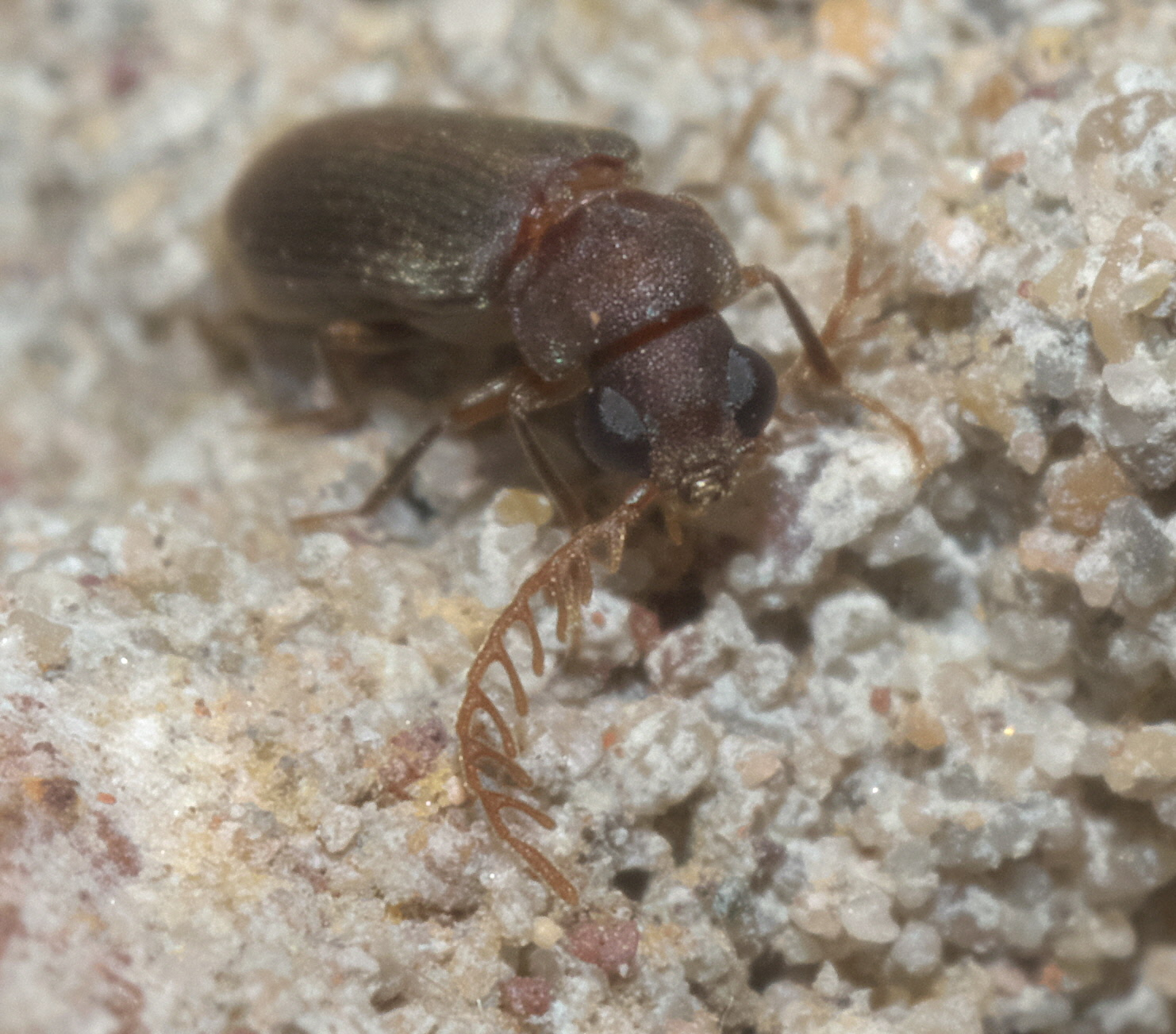
- Euceratocerus gibbifrons

Scientific classification
- Kingdom: Animalia
- Phylum: Arthropoda
- Class: Insecta
- Order: Coleoptera
- Suborder: Polyphaga
- Family: Ptinidae
- Subfamily: Anobiinae
- Tribe: Euceratocerini

= Euceratocerini =

Tribe of beetles

Euceratocerini is a tribe of death-watch beetles in the family Ptinidae. There are at least 4 genera and about 18 described species in Euceratocerini.

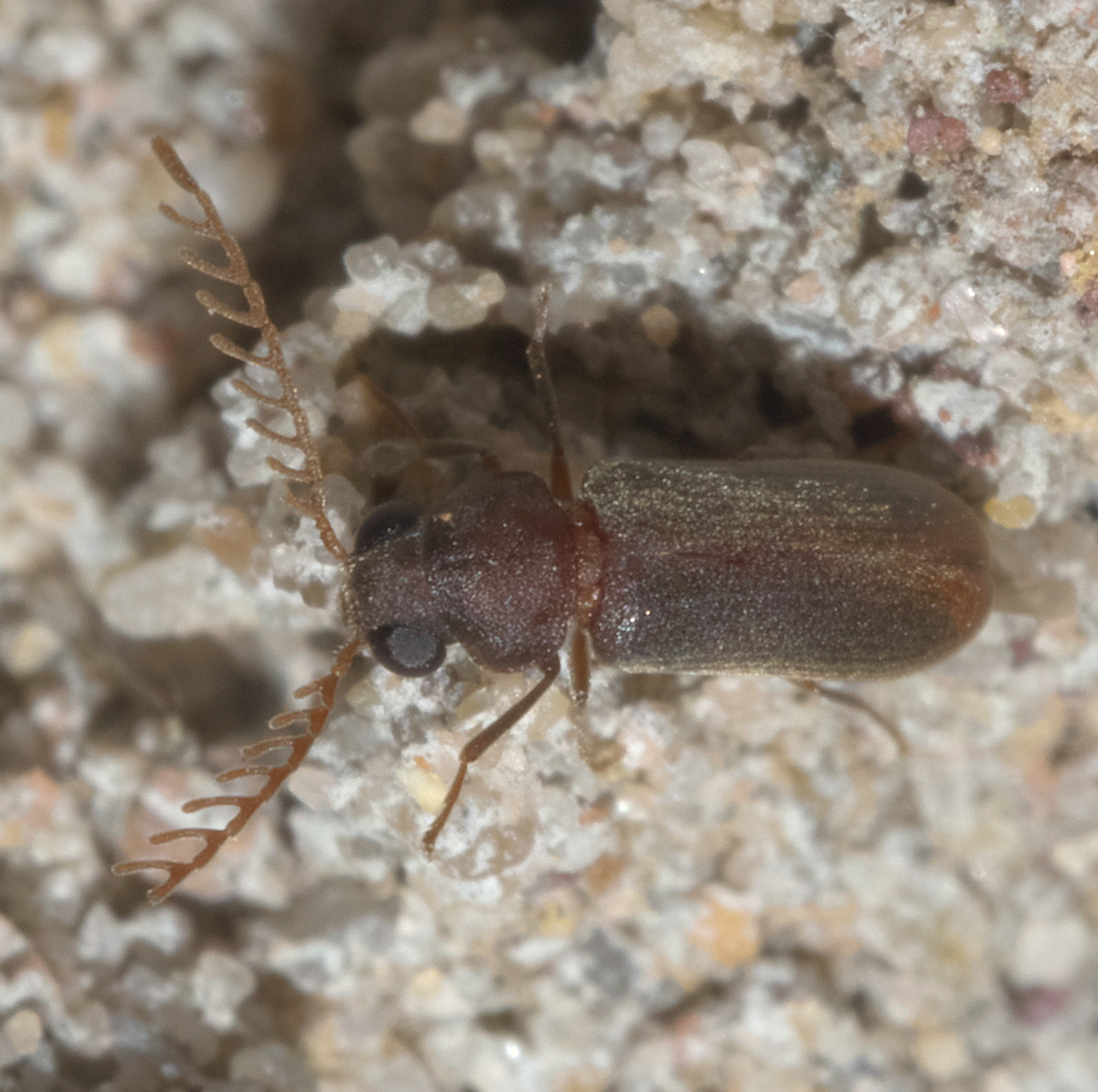
Euceratocerus gibbifrons

== Genera ==
These four genera belong to the tribe Euceratocerini:

- Actenobius Fall, 1905^{i c g b}
- Ctenobium LeConte, 1865^{i c g b}
- Euceratocerus LeConte, 1874^{i c g b}
- Xeranobium Fall, 1905^{i c g b}

Data sources: i = ITIS, c = Catalogue of Life, g = GBIF, b = Bugguide.net
