= Cacotemnus =

Scientific classification
- Domain: Eukaryota
- Kingdom: Animalia
- Phylum: Arthropoda
- Class: Insecta
- Order: Coleoptera
- Suborder: Polyphaga
- Family: Ptinidae
- Tribe: Anobiini
- Genus: Cacotemnus; LeConte, 1861

Genus of beetles

Cacotemnus is a genus of beetles belonging to the family Ptinidae. The species of this genus are found in Europe and North America.

== Species ==
Two species are recognised in the genus Cacotemnus:

- Cacotemnus rufipes
- Cacotemnus thomsoni
