= Microbregma =

Scientific classification
- Kingdom: Animalia
- Phylum: Arthropoda
- Class: Insecta
- Order: Coleoptera
- Suborder: Polyphaga
- Family: Ptinidae
- Subfamily: Anobiinae
- Genus: Microbregma; Seidlitz, 1889
- Species: M. emarginatum

Binomial name
- Microbregma emarginatum Duftschmid, 1825

Genus of beetles

Microbregma is a monotypic genus of beetles in the family Ptinidae containing the single species Microbregma emarginatum. It is native to North America.

The beetle lives in hardwood and softwood forests. The larva feeds on bark. It has been collected from pine, hemlock, hickory, and spruce.
