= Desmatogaster =

Scientific classification
- Kingdom: Animalia
- Phylum: Arthropoda
- Class: Insecta
- Order: Coleoptera
- Suborder: Polyphaga
- Family: Ptinidae
- Tribe: Hadrobregmini
- Genus: Desmatogaster; Knutson, 1963

Genus of beetles

Desmatogaster is a genus of beetles in the family Ptinidae. There is at least one described species in Desmatogaster, D. subconnata.
