= Priobium =

Scientific classification
- Kingdom: Animalia
- Phylum: Arthropoda
- Class: Insecta
- Order: Coleoptera
- Suborder: Polyphaga
- Family: Ptinidae
- Subfamily: Anobiinae
- Genus: Priobium; Thomson, 1863

Genus of beetles

Priobium is a genus of wood-boring, death-watch beetles ranging in western distribution in North America. Their antennae are without a distinct club. A pronotum similar to Hadrobregmus is characteristic. The various species appear similar. The larvae consume conifers.

== Selected species ==
- Priobium carpini (Herbst, 1793)
- Priobium dendrobiiforme Reitter, 1901
- Priobium mexicanum White, 1975
- Priobium punctatum (LeConte, 1859)
- Priobium sericeum (Say, 1825)
