= Claudius Rey =

French entomologist

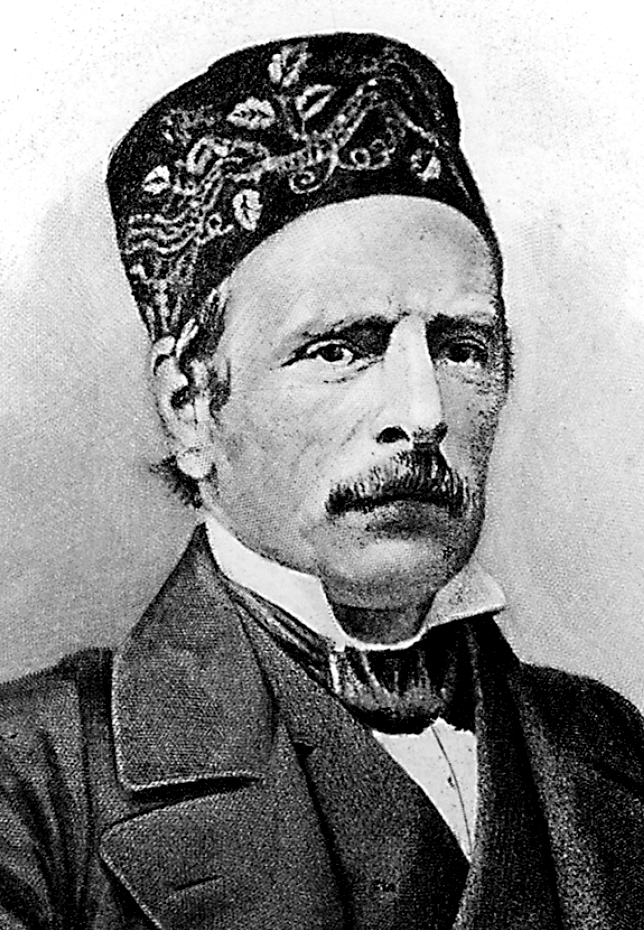
Claudius Rey

Claudius Rey (2 September 1817, in Lille – 31 January 1895, in Lille) was a French entomologist.

Rey’s family owned a prosperous printing works which went bankrupt in 1847. One of his uncles, the owner of a vineyard producing Morgon, offered him employment. Impassioned by entomology, he began a collaboration with Etienne Mulsant (1797–1880) who was then working on Histoire naturelle des coléoptères de France - Natural History of the Beetles of France. In 1852, Rey settled in Lyon, in the residence of his brother in Saint-Genis-Laval. He took his Winter holidays in the South of France seeking insects. His work with Mulsant lasted until Mulsant’s death. The majority of the texts on Staphylinidae are the work of the two entomologists but five parts (Habrocerinae, Tachyporinae, Trichophyinae, Picropeplinae and Steninae) are the work of Rey alone. The Coleoptera are not the only study of Mulsant and Rey since they also worked on naturelle des punaises de France -the Natural history of the True Bugs of France. In addition to these publications, Claudius Rey wrote many articles on Coleoptera in journals . He described 8 genera and 48 species. 116 genera and 407 species bear his name alongside that of Mulsant.
