= Georg Karl Maria Seidlitz =

German doctor and entomologist (1840-1917)

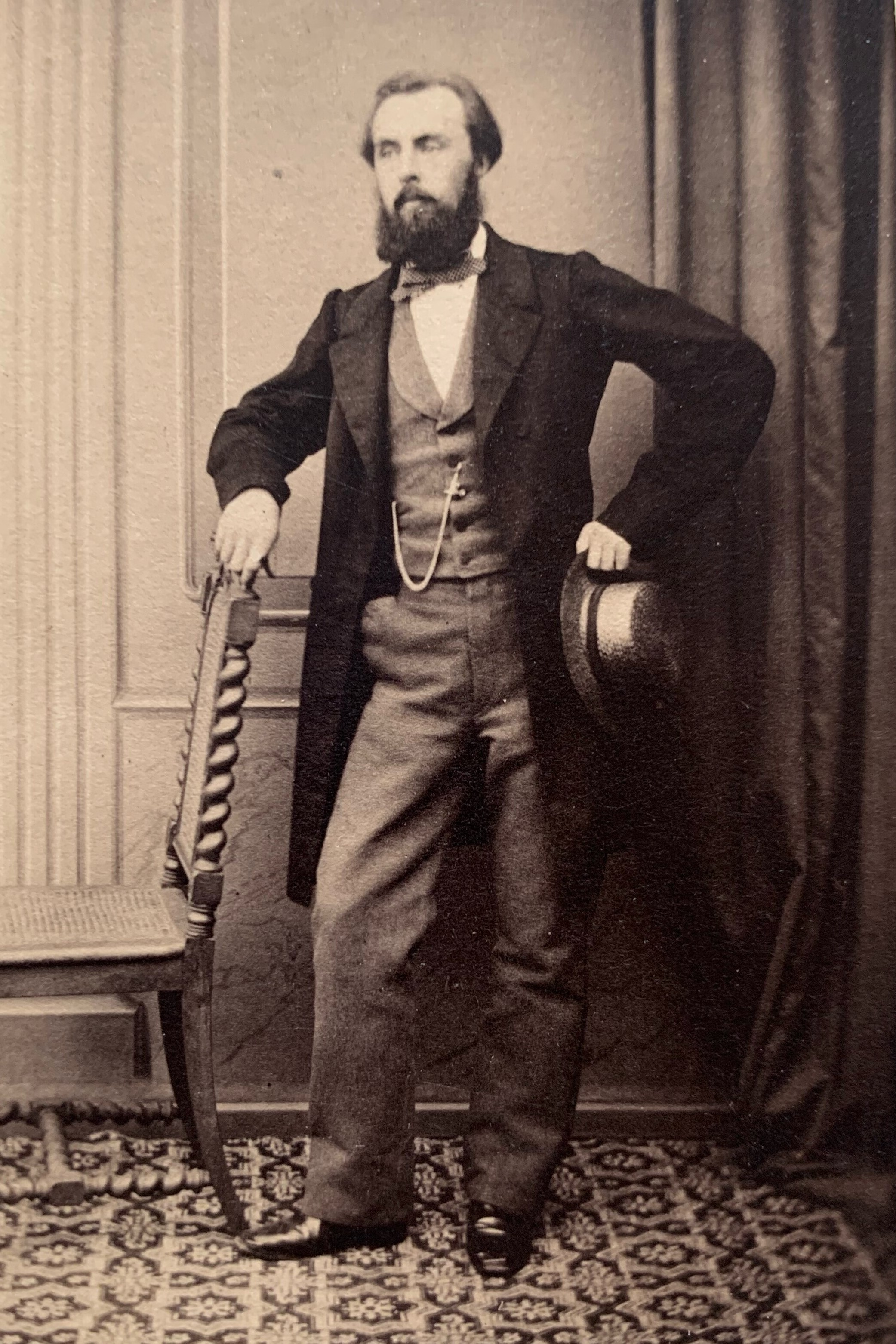
Georg Karl Maria von Seidlitz

Georg Karl Maria von Seidlitz (June 19, 1840, St. Petersburg – July 15, 1917, Irschenhausen near Munich) was a German doctor and entomologist. He was a zoology teacher in Dorpat (1868–77), then in Königsberg, (1877–88), where he became a fishery expert. He later specialised in Coleoptera, describing many new species and he wrote Fauna Baltica. Die Käfer (Coleoptera) der Ostseeprovinzen Russlands. Dorpat, 1875. His general beetle collection is conserved in the Zoologische Staatssammlung München, his Baltic Coleoptera are in the zoology museum in Kaliningrad.

Von Seidlitz was an early supporter of Darwinism in continental Europe.

== Selected publications ==
- Die Darwin'sche Theorie: Elf Vorlesungen über die Entstehung der Thiere und Planzen durch Naturzüchtung (1871)
