= Annales de la Société entomologique de France =

- Discipline: Entomology
- Language: English / French
- Edited by: Antoine Mantilleri

Publication details
- History: 1832–present
- Publisher: Taylor & Francis on behalf of Société entomologique de France (France)
- Frequency: Bimonthly
- Impact factor: 1.111

Standard abbreviations
- ISO 4: Ann. Soc. Entomol. Fr.

Indexing
- CODEN: ASEQAQ
- ISSN: 0037-9271 (print); 2168-6351 (web)
- LCCN: sn85006180
- OCLC no.: 01765810

Links
- Journal homepage

Annales de la Société entomologique de France (French pronunciation: [anal də la sɔsjete ɑ̃tɔmɔlɔʒik də fʁɑ̃s]) is one of the oldest entomology journals in the world. It was founded in 1832, and began a new series (nouvelle série) in 1965, when it merged with Revue Française d'Entomologie and Revue de Pathologie Végétale et d'Entomologie Agricole de France. It is published by Taylor & Francis. It publishes original research papers about insects (Hexapoda), Arachnida and Myriapoda: taxonomy, comparative morphology, phylogeny, zoogeography, population genetics, plant-insect relationships, ethology, ecology, biology. Concerning taxonomy, the journal avoids publishing isolated descriptions and gives preference to papers that include ecological, biogeographical, phylogenetical considerations, or comprehensive revisions.

== See also ==
- List of entomology journals
