= Henry Clinton Fall =

American entomologist (1862–1939)

Henry Clinton Fall (25 December 1862, Farmington, New Hampshire – 14 November 1939, Tyngsboro, Massachusetts) was an American entomologist.

Fall received in 1884 his bachelor's degree from Dartmouth College in New Hampshire. He taught from 1884 to 1889 mathematics and physics in Chicago secondary schools, and then in 1889 for health reasons moved to Southern California. From 1889 to 1917 he taught physical sciences at Pasadena High School and was, for almost a quarter of a century, the head of the physical sciences department. A visit from George Henry Horn inspired Fall to begin scientific study of insects and to write an 1893 article on beetles.

Subsequent papers included revisions of various beetle families and lists of species known from the California Channel Islands and southern California. Fall was one of the first researchers to work on insects, particularly Coleoptera, of the Channel Islands.

In 1917 he retired to live in Tyngsboro, Massachusetts, which is about 43 kilometers (26 miles) in a straight line to Cambridge, Massachusetts. He continued to identify and curate insect specimens sent to him and published his last scientific paper in 1937.

He accumulated about 250,000 specimens, described 1,484 species, and wrote 144 publications. He received an honorary Ph.D. degree from Dartmouth College in 1929 and died in Massachusetts in 1939. His insect collection and papers were left to the Museum of Comparative Zoology of Harvard University.

Fall's collection includes about 20,000 different insect species. He inspired many coleopterists, including Edwin Van Dyke and Frank Ellsworth Blaisdell.

Fall has a scholarship in his name at Dover High School in Dover, NH. The inaugural scholarship winner was Madigan Jennison-Henderson (2021).
