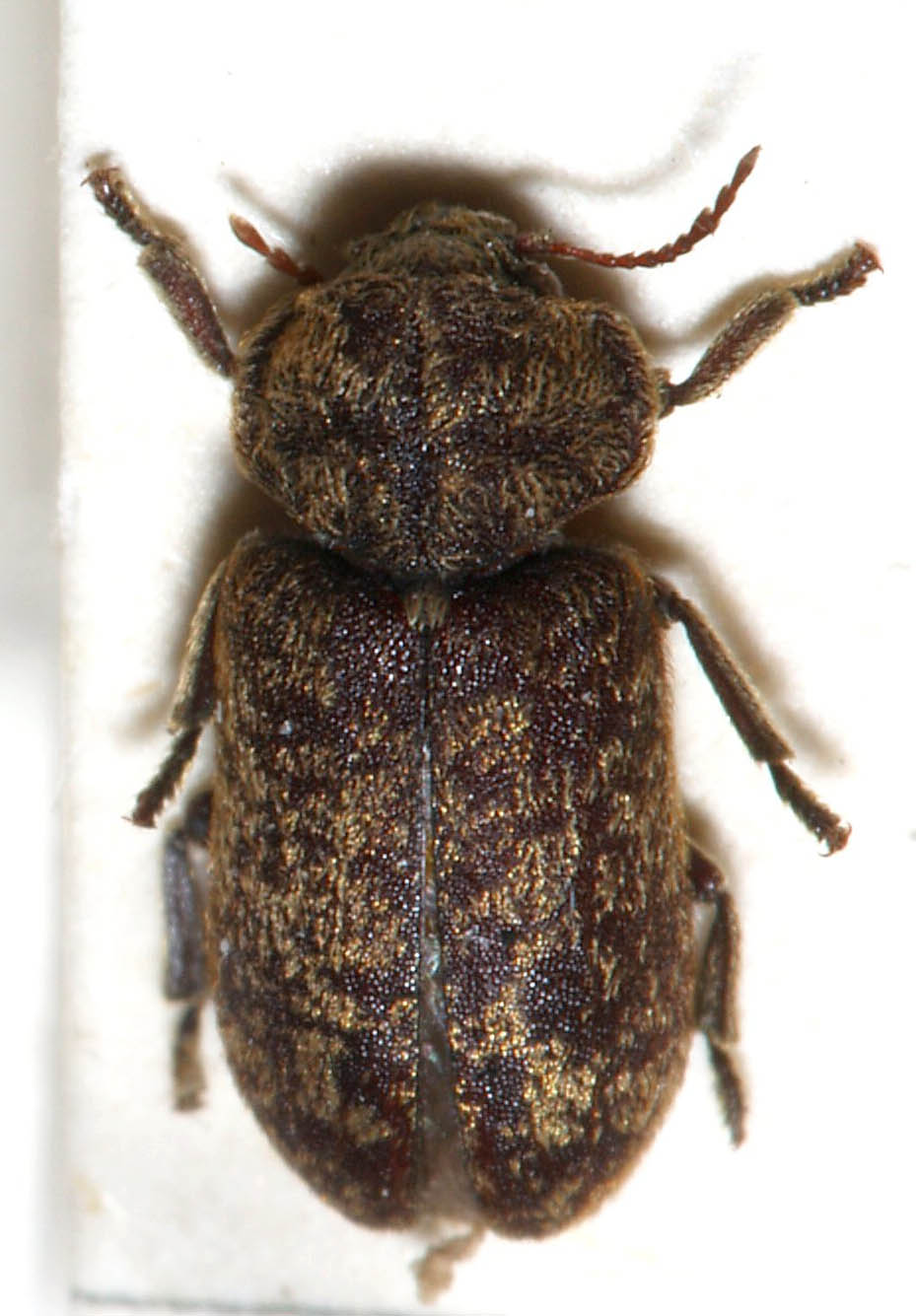

Scientific classification
- Kingdom: Animalia
- Phylum: Arthropoda
- Clade: Pancrustacea
- Class: Insecta
- Order: Coleoptera
- Suborder: Polyphaga
- Family: Ptinidae
- Subfamily: Ernobiinae
- Tribe: Xestobiini
- Genus: Xestobium
- Species: X. rufovillosum

Binomial name
- Xestobium rufovillosum (De Geer, 1774)

= Deathwatch beetle =

Species of woodboring beetle

The deathwatch beetle (Xestobium rufovillosum) is a species of woodboring beetle that sometimes infests the structural timbers of old buildings. The adult beetle is brown and averages 7 mm (0.3 in) in length. Eggs are laid in dark crevices in old wood inside buildings, trees, or tunnels left behind by previous larvae. The larvae bore into the timber, feeding for up to ten years before pupating, after which they emerge from the wood as adult beetles. Timber that has been damp and is affected by fungal decay is soft enough for the larvae to chew through. They obtain nourishment by using enzymes present in their gut to digest the cellulose and hemicellulose in the wood.

The larvae of deathwatch beetles weaken the structural timbers of a building by tunneling through them. Treatment with insecticides to kill the larvae is largely ineffective, and killing the adult beetles when they emerge in spring and early summer may be a better option. However, infestations by the beetles are often limited to historic buildings, because modern buildings tend to use softwoods for joists and rafters, rather than the aged oak timbers which the beetles prefer.

To attract mates, the adult insects create a tapping or ticking sound that can sometimes be heard in the rafters of old buildings on summer nights. For that reason, the deathwatch beetle is associated with quiet, sleepless nights, so it was named for the vigil (watch) being kept beside the dying or dead. By extension, there exists a superstition that the sounds are an omen of impending death.

Sound produced by the deathwatch beetle

== Taxonomy ==
The deathwatch beetle is part of the beetle family Ptinidae, formerly known as Anobiidae. This includes a number of subfamilies including Ptininae, the spider beetles which are mostly scavengers, Anobiinae, wood-boring beetles, and Ernobiinae, deathwatch beetles, also wood-borers. In 1912, Maurice Pic erected Ernobiinae for beetles previously classified under Dryophilini by Fall in 1905. White elevated this taxon to subfamily status in 1962 and 1971, and in 1974 included 14 genera in the subfamily.

== Description ==
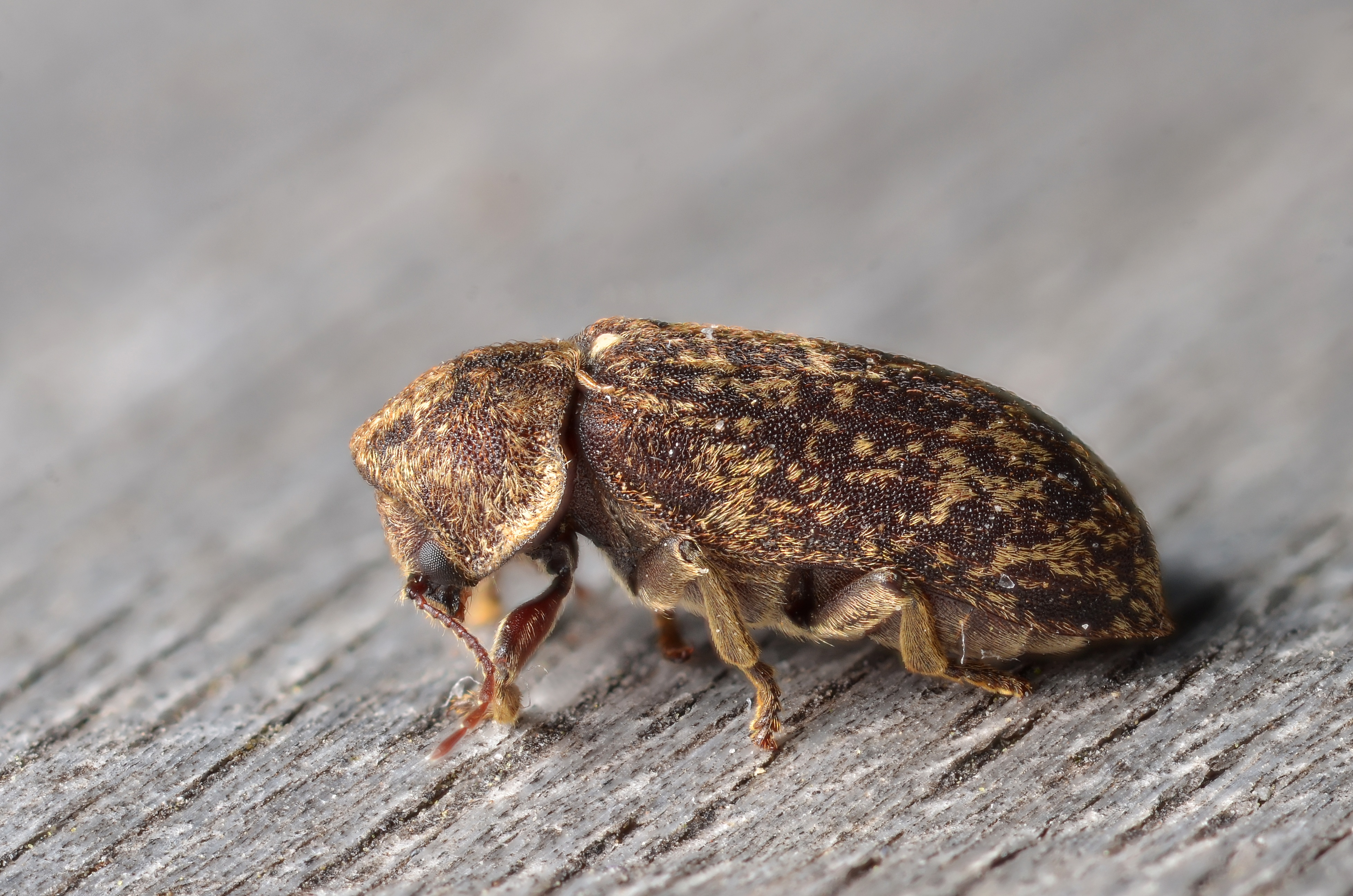
Adult in side view

The eggs are white, slightly pointed at one end and sticky. Eggs measure on average 0.7 mm (~0.03 in) in length and 0.5 mm (~0.02 in) in width.

The larvae are creamy-white with six legs, black jaws, a pair of eyespots on either side of the head. They grow to about 11 mm (0.4 in) long, making them the largest Ptininae found in Britain. These larvae are distinctive due to a swollen thoracic region and multiple golden setae.

The pupa, when newly formed, is shiny and milky white in colour. It gradually darkens as the larva matures and develops eyes, tarsi, and "teeth". During this stage of development, the larva will completely change appearance by forming a head, complete eyes, mouthparts, antennae, and legs. The pupa measures 7–8 mm in length and around 3 mm in width.

The adult deathwatch beetle is cylindrical measuring on average 6 to 7.5 mm (0.24 to 0.30 in) long. The head is largely concealed by a brown thoracic shield. The shield and elytra are dark brown or reddish-brown, with a patchy felting of yellowish-grey short hairs. The antennae have eleven segments, the distal three segments are somewhat enlarged.

== Distribution and habitat ==
This beetle is found in Europe, including the United Kingdom, as well as North America, Corsica, Algeria, and New Caledonia. Its natural habitat is dead or decaying hardwood, or in some cases coniferous wood, especially when the timber has been softened by fungal attack. This may be due to the way fungal decayed wood affects nitrogen metabolism in the deathwatch beetle. Decayed wood is also much easier for the larvae of the deathwatch beetle to bore into which allows them to develop at a faster rate. The sapwood is more nutritious and is usually attacked first, followed by heart wood that has been softened by decay. Oak (Quercus spp.) is the main host, with American oaks being more susceptible than European oaks. Pollarded willow is also attacked in the United Kingdom. The beetle does not infest wood that has recently died; about sixty years must pass for dead oak to reach a suitable condition for attack. These beetles tend to stay on the same piece of wood for several generations until resources are used up and the piece of wood is no longer sufficient.

== Life cycle ==
In Britain, the adults emerge in April, May or June. The males emerge first, and the females are willing to copulate as soon as they emerge, often in the afternoon. Emergence only occurs in temperatures above 10 °C (50 °F). Mating takes place in a concealed location, mainly on surface wood, and lasts for about an hour. Females lay eggs in crevices in the wood or in the holes left by emerging beetles, The adults do not feed, and so die within a few weeks, by which time the female may have laid 40 to 80 eggs in small batches.

The eggs hatch after about a month. The newly hatched larvae are tiny and chew their way into the timber, feeding on the wood. Their growth is slow and it may take from two to ten years, or even more, for them to reach their full size. At this stage they pupate in a chamber close to the wood surface, and either emerge through a newly created hole after twenty to thirty days, or else emerge in the following spring (about eleven months later).

== Ecology ==
In buildings, deathwatch beetles infest old oak timbers, especially those that have been the subject of fungal decay, usually by the fungus Donkioporia expansa. This fungus affects damp timber, often gaining entry where rafters or joists are embedded in stone walls, or in the vicinity of leaking roofs or overflowing gutters. It is not the adult insects that cause structural damage to the building, but rather their larvae tunneling through the wood.

Wood is difficult to digest, but as long as the wood has been softened by fungal decay, the enzymes in the guts of the larvae are able to digest the cellulose and hemicellulose forming the cell walls; this enables the larvae to make use of the protein, starch, and sugars found within the cells.

The steely blue beetle (Korynetes caeruleus) is a predator of the deathwatch beetle and of the common furniture beetle (Anobium punctatum). The adult female blue beetle lays her eggs in the exit holes made by the emerging borers, and the carnivorous larvae wander through the galleries made by the wood-borers, feeding on their larvae. The adult deathwatch beetles are weak fliers and may run over the surface of the timber, rather than fly. They are sometimes caught by spiders, their silk-encased husks being found on webs.

== Host selection ==
An adult female deathwatch beetle is short-lived (1–2 months) and must find a suitable host in which to lay her eggs relatively quickly. She is capable of using odour to locate wood that has been decayed by fungi, which provides an excellent host. When selecting a host, old wood (more than a century old) is favoured, though it is unknown whether it is due to prevalence of fungus, general state of decay, or other factors. Trees with deep crevices are also favoured, as they provide a dark safe shelter for the eggs.

== Communication ==
A deathwatch beetle communicates by hitting its head on a substrate to create a noise, a method called tapping. Males and females differ in that males usually tap first, and females tap only in response to males. A female responds within 2 seconds of a male tap. After the female responds, a male will tap again from 2 to 30 seconds later. The taps create a substrate-borne vibration. This long-distance communication mode differs from that of most wood-boring beetles, which use pheromones.

To locate females, males will walk a short distance, stop and tap, orient themselves towards a female's response, and repeat. If females respond they advertise their receptivity. Recently mated females will not respond. Each tapping bout contains between 4–11 taps at an average frequency of 10 Hz. Females will only respond to tapping bouts with 6 or more taps and only bouts with a frequency of 4–20 Hz. Males with higher frequencies are more likely to obtain a mate than males with lower frequencies.

== Mating ==
Females have been shown to be selective of which males they mate with. During mating, males give up a significant fraction of their body mass, an average of 13.5%, via ejaculation of the spermatophore. This is a nutritional nuptial gift to the female. Although females cannot tell the mass of the male by looking at them, females can instead determine the mass of the male when the male tries to climb on the females back and mount them. Since male deathwatch beetles do not feed, their resources for the gift have been stored from the larval stage. Males who are heavier in mass are capable of donating a larger mass to the female than lighter males which results in females choosing heavier males and rejecting lighter males. By giving up this much body weight, males are reducing the likelihood that they will mate with an additional female due to a lack of resources for a further gift.

== Damage ==
Many English buildings, especially in the south of the country, are built from old oak wood which these beetles seem to be attracted to, and the greatest economic damage these beetles cause is in England.

Identification of which insect is present in interior timbers is difficult; by their nature, the larvae are tucked away from sight in their galleries. The presence of wood-boring insects may be indicated by frass (fecal residue) and fresh dust. Recent exit holes often have bright rims, while the rims of older holes have become dull. The species of insects involved can sometimes be identified by examination of the fecal pellets in the frass. Adult beetles, alive or dead, may be present on the glass or the sills of windows, as may the specific enemies of the beetles in the same locations—a likely indication of specific wood-boring insects inside.

Direct examination of the interior of the timber by destructive means is often not acceptable, and non-invasive means are required. Other means of identifying the wood-boring insects include pheromone traps; these are effective for the common furniture beetle and the house longhorn beetle (Hylotrupes bajulus) but not for the deathwatch beetle. However, adults of the deathwatch beetle are attracted to light. The sounds of the feeding larvae can be heard either unaided or with the help of a stethoscope, and X-ray scans and computer tomography can also be used. Similarly, active larvae may be identified by vibrations in the ultrasound range. The exit holes of deathwatch beetles are 2 to 3 mm (about 0.1 inch) in diameter, larger than those produced by the common furniture beetle.

Deathwatch beetles will only attack buildings primarily made out of hardwood. Coniferous wood in buildings will be attacked only if it is in contact with the hardwood.

== Treatment ==
This beetle was first described in 1668 by John Wilkins, but it was not until 1913 that the first scientific study was conducted by Professor Maxwell-Lefroy in an attempt to come up with a management solution for these beetles.

The larvae of deathwatch beetle feed deep within timbers. Recent studies have suggested that most of the previously accepted practices of external application of insecticides are largely ineffective. Only gas fumigation remains effective, but poses considerable practical challenges in effectively sealing the larger, historic types of properties that these beetles are mostly attracted to. External insecticide application may, in fact, do more harm than good by killing the natural enemies of the beetle. One way of dealing with the problem may be with the use of ultra-violet "insectocutors", to attract and kill the adults that emerge from the wood in the spring. If there is concern about the strength of structural timbers, a structural surveyor can drill core samples to determine the condition of the wood.

Modern techniques of ultrasound examination now allow the extent and localisation of an attack within timbers to be determined with great accuracy, and, for historic properties where damage to ornate plasterwork must be avoided, can be followed by micro-drilling and highly-targeted injection of insecticide via hypodermic needle. Alternatively, where a degree of damage to the fabric of a building is acceptable, larger 6 mm holes can be drilled deep into the timbers, and a thick, insecticide-laden paste introduced which does not seep out into surrounding areas. In all situations, any structural damage which has permitted water to ingress and moisten the timbers now being attacked should be addressed in order to slow down the life cycle of the insects, and thus minimize their spread.

== In culture ==
The tapping sound of the deathwatch beetle has long been associated as a harbinger of death, being most audible on quiet nights in the rafters of old houses, and in silent bedside vigils for the dying.

Historical versions of the death-watch belief often connected the ticking specifically with a death in the household rather than with misfortune in general. The association could become particularly ominous when someone in the house was already ill, with the repeated sound interpreted as warning that the sick person or another member of the family might die. Nineteenth-century folklore and natural-history accounts continued to record this household interpretation even after the sound had been identified as the activity of small wood-boring insects.

The English writer, physician, and naturalist Thomas Browne (1605–1682) attempted to correct misconceptions about the deathwatch beetle as an omen of death in his encyclopedic catalog of common errors, Pseudodoxia Epidemica:

Few ears have escaped the noise of the dead-watch, that is, the little clickling [sic] sound heard often in many rooms, somewhat resembling that of a watch; and this is conceived to be of an evil omen or prediction of some persons death: wherein notwithstanding there is nothing of rational presage or just cause of terrour unto melancholy and meticulous heads. For this noise is made by a little sheath-winged gray insect found often in wainscot, benches, and wood-work in the Summer. We have taken many thereof, and kept them in thin boxes, wherein I have heard and seen them work and knack with a little proboscis or trunk against the side of the box, like a picus martius, or woodpecker against a tree....He that could extinguish the terrifying apprehensions hereof, might prevent the passions of the heart, and many cold sweats in grandmothers and nurses, who in the sickness of children, are so startled with these noises." (II.vii, 1650 edition)

Its notoriety as an ill omen is alluded to in the fourth book of John Keats' 1818 poem "Endymion":

... within ye hear
No sound so loud as when on curtain'd bier
The death-watch tick is stifled.

The term "death watch" has been applied to a variety of other ticking insects, including Anobium striatum; some of the so-called booklice of the family Psocidae, and the appropriately named Atropos divinatoria and Clothilla pulsatoria (in Greek mythology Atropos and Clotho were two of the three moirai (Fates) associated with death).

In 1838, Henry David Thoreau published an essay mentioning the deathwatch beetle. It is possible that this essay influenced Edgar Allan Poe's 1843 short story "The Tell-Tale Heart" and that the sound the protagonist was hearing at the end of that story was that of a beetle tapping inside the wall, not the beating of the (dead) victim's heart. However, it is more likely that it was the metronomic ticking of a booklouse rather than the groups of six to eight taps made by the deathwatch beetle.

The beetle was referenced in Mark Twain's 1876 The Adventures of Tom Sawyer: "Next the ghastly ticking of a deathwatch in the wall at the bed's head made Tom shudder – it meant that somebody's days were numbered."

Even Beatrix Potter references the beetle in her children's book The Tailor of Gloucester (written 1901, published 1903) when the mice under the tea-cups start up "a chorus of little tappings, all sounding together, and answering one another, like watch-beetles in an old worm-eaten window-shutter—".

In Dorothy L. Sayers' Gaudy Night (chapter 17), the mechanism of the ticking of the death-watch beetle is discussed, and it is compared with a clicking sound made by an ill-fitting hard shirt front.

In 1988, Linda Pastan wrote a poem entitled "The Deathwatch Beetle". In 1995, Alice Hoffman made reference to the deathwatch beetle in her novel Practical Magic, using it as an omen of death; the main character hears it shortly before her husband dies.
