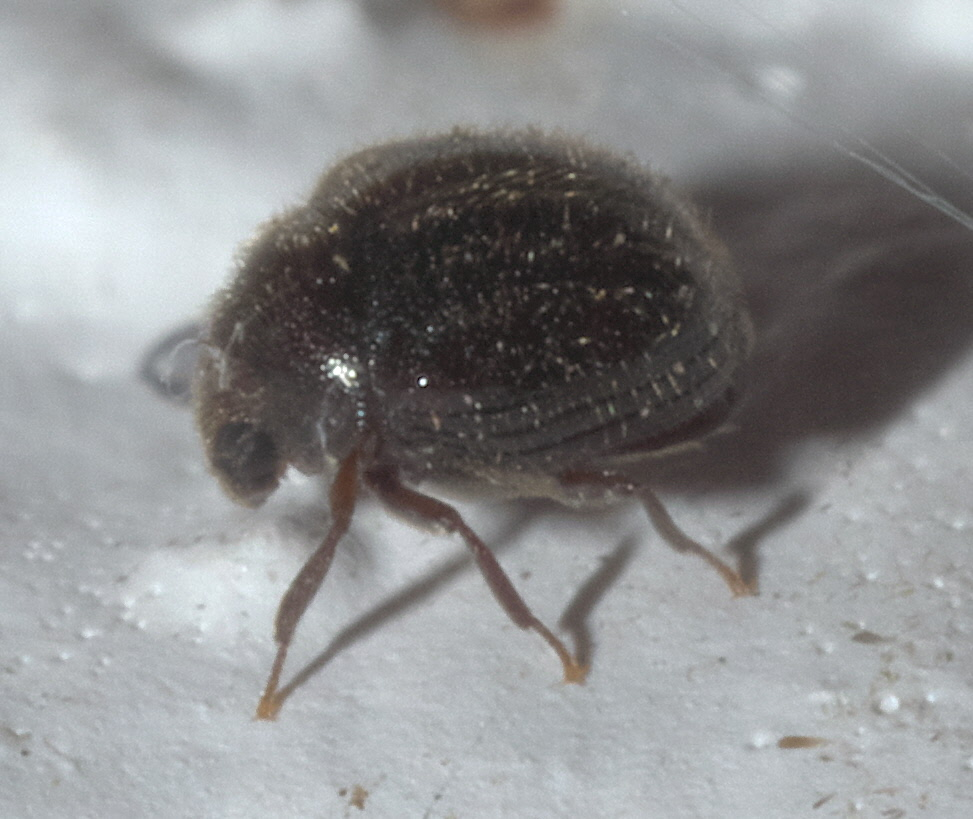
- Caenocara sp.

Scientific classification
- Kingdom: Animalia
- Phylum: Arthropoda
- Clade: Pancrustacea
- Class: Insecta
- Order: Coleoptera
- Suborder: Polyphaga
- Infraorder: Bostrichiformia
- Superfamily: Bostrichoidea
- Family: Ptinidae; Latreille, 1802

Subfamilies
- Alvarenganiellinae Viana and Martínez, 1971; Anobiinae Fleming, 1821; Dorcatominae C. G. Thomson, 1859; Dryophilinae LeConte, 1861; Ernobiinae Pic, 1912; Eucradinae LeConte, 1861; Mesocoelopodinae Mulsant & Rey, 1864; Ptilininae Shuckard, 1840; Ptininae Latreille, 1802; Xyletininae Gistel, 1856

Diversity
- at least 220 genera

= Ptinidae =

Ptinidae Temporal range: 105–0 Ma Late Albian-Present

Family of beetles

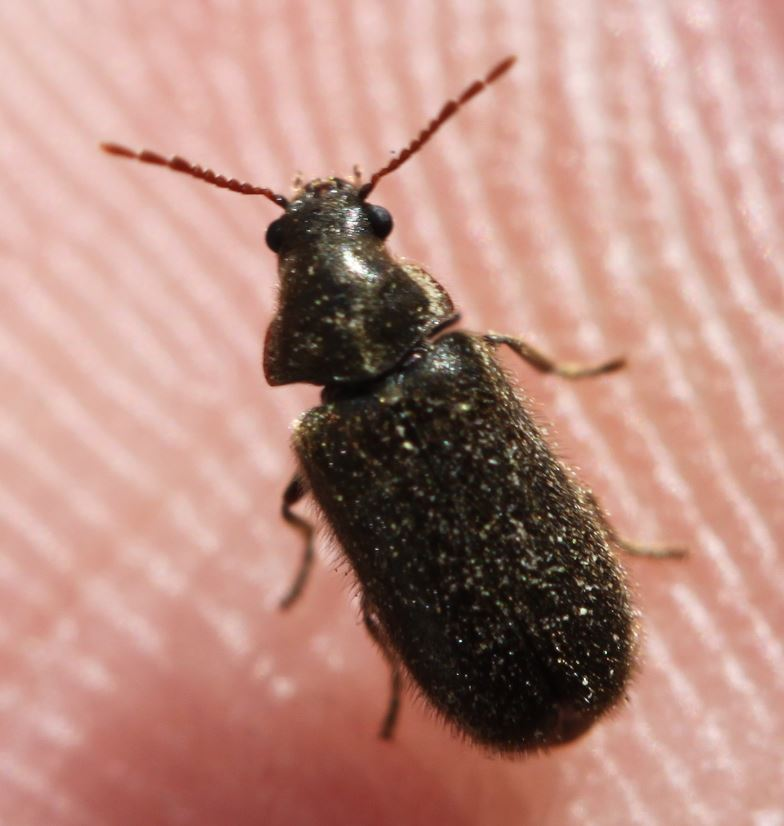
Xestobium plumbeum

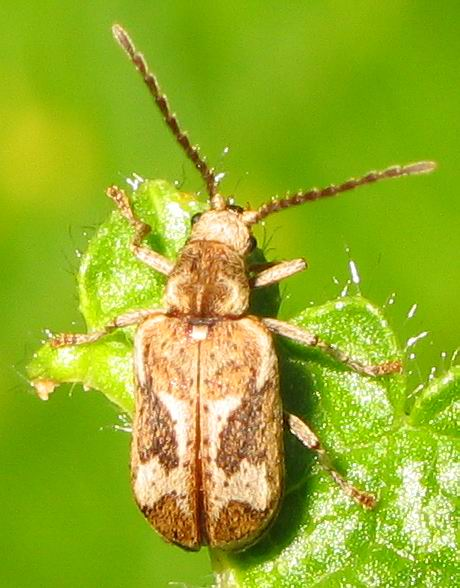
Hedobia imperialis, Fan-bearing wood borer

Ptinidae is a family of beetles in the superfamily Bostrichoidea. There are at least 220 genera and 2,200 described species in Ptinidae worldwide. The family includes spider beetles and deathwatch beetle, as well as the cigarette, drugstore and furniture beetles.

The Ptinidae family species are hard to identify because they are so small, and they have a compact body structure. They also have similar morphologies within the genera and species of the family.

There are three main groups in the superfamily Bostrichoidea: Bostrichidae, Anobiidae, and Ptinidae. These have undergone frequent changes in hierarchical classification since their inception. They have been treated as a single family, three independent families, the two families Bostrichidae and Anobiidae, or the two families Bostrichidae and Ptinidae. More recent literature treats these as the two families Bostrichidae and Ptinidae, with Anobiidae a subfamily of Ptinidae (Anobiinae).

Spider beetles are so named because they look like spiders. Some species have long legs, antennae that can seem like an additional pair of legs, and a body shape that may appear superficially like that of a spider.

Deathwatch beetles are named because of a clicking noise that two (and possibly more) species tend to make in the walls of houses and other buildings. This clicking noise is designed to communicate with potential mates, but has historically caused fear of impending death during times of plague and sickness.

== Pests ==
The larvae of a number of Ptinidae species tend to bore into wood, earning them the name "woodworm" or "wood borer". Several species are pests, causing damage to wooden furniture, house structures, tobacco, and dried food products. The deathwatch beetles Xestobium rufovillosum, Hemicoelus carinatus, and Hemicoelus gibbicollis are economically significant pests, damaging flooring, joists, and other timber in housing.

The "furniture beetle", Anobium punctatum, is a species that is often found emerging from in-home wood furnishings. The "drugstore beetle", Stegobium paniceum, is known to infest a variety of stored materials, including bread, flour, cereal, prescription drugs, strychnine powder, packaged foods, and even Egyptian tombs.

The "cigarette beetle," Lasioderma serricorne, is a widespread and destructive pest of harvested and manufactured tobacco. Damage and economic losses from L. serricorne infestations were estimated by the USDA to be 0.7% of the total warehoused tobacco commodity in 1971.

== See also ==
- List of Ptinidae genera
