= Nitida =

Nitida, Nitidum and Nitidus are forms of the Latin for "bright, shining, sleek, blooming, smart" and may refer to:

Nitida:

- Nitida saga, a 14th-century Icelandic medieval story

Nitidus:

- Barbichthys nitidus, a junior synonym of B. laevis
- Eleutherodactylus nitidus, a species of frog in the family Leptodactylidae
- Emmelichthys nitidus, a rover species found at depths of between 100 and 500 m
- Euryoryzomys nitidus, a rodent species in the genus Euryoryzomys of family Cricetidae
- Hemicoelus nitidus, a species of beetles in the genus Hemicoelus of the family Anobiidae
- Lichen nitidus, a chronic inflammatory disease of unknown etiology
- Limnonectes nitidus, a species of frog in the family Ranidae
- Liolaemus nitidus, known as the shining tree iguana is a species of lizard in the family Iguanidae
- Nassarius nitidus, a species of sea snail, a marine gastropod mollusk in the family Nassariidae
- Petalonyx nitidus, a species of flowering plant in the family Loasaceae known as shinyleaf sandpaper plant
- Phymatodes nitidus, a species of longhorn beetle
- Rhabdoblennius nitidus, a species of combtooth blenny found in coral reefs in the western Pacific Ocean
- Sphoeroides nitidus, a species in the family Tetraodontidae, or pufferfishes
- Stemonoporus nitidus, a species of plant in the family Dipterocarpaceae
- Zonitoides nitidus, species of small, air-breathing land snail in the family Gastrodontidae

Nitidum

- Leptospermum nitidum, the shining tea-tree, a shrub species endemic to Tasmania
- Pisidium nitidum, the shining pea clam, a freshwater clam species
- Strioterebrum nitidum, the shiny Pacific auger, a sea snail species
- Zanthoxylum nitidum the shiny-leaf prickly-ash, a flowering plant species
- Meioceras nitidum, a sea snail species
