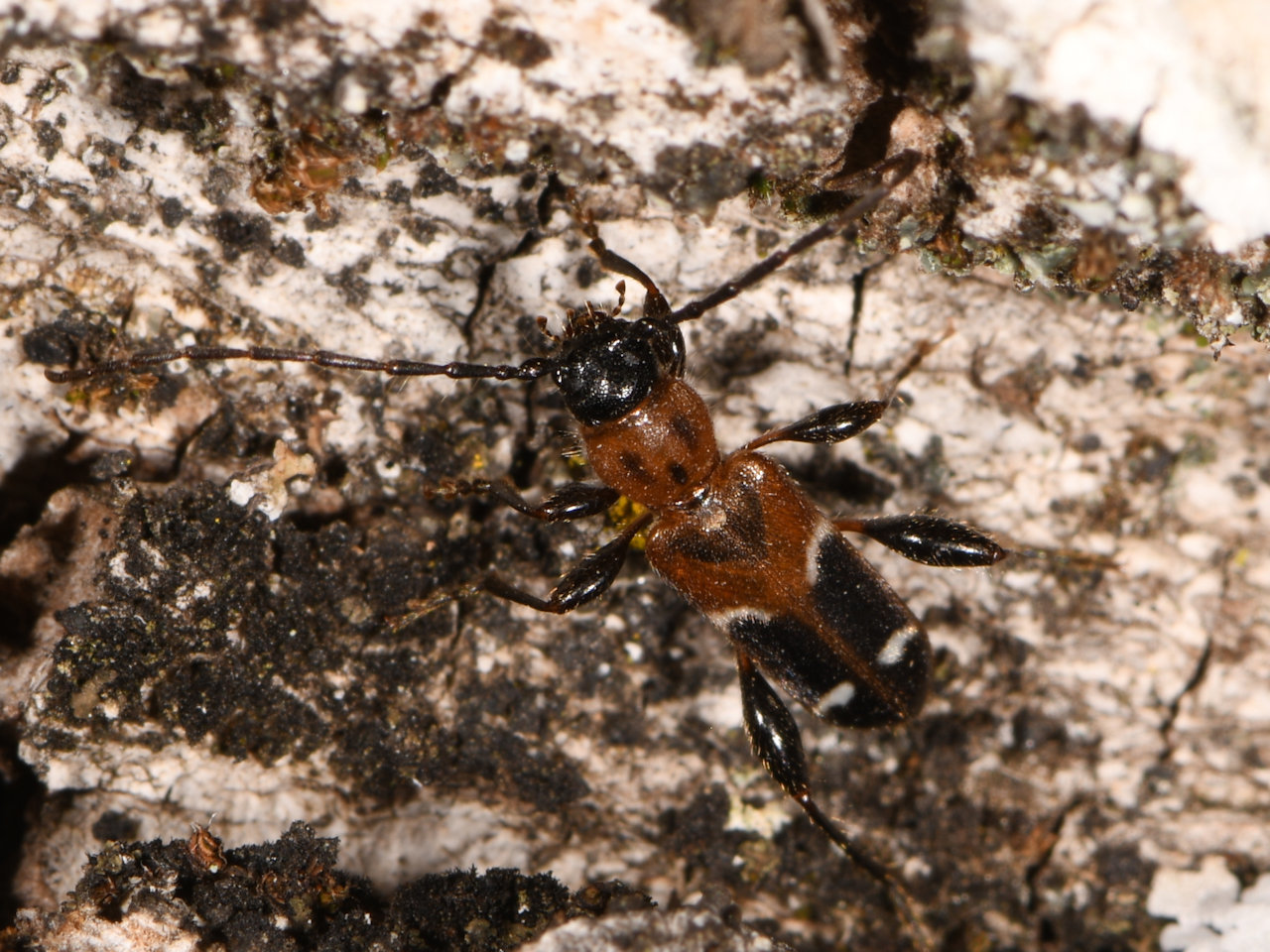
- Phymatodes obliquus, California

Scientific classification
- Kingdom: Animalia
- Phylum: Arthropoda
- Class: Insecta
- Order: Coleoptera
- Suborder: Polyphaga
- Infraorder: Cucujiformia
- Family: Cerambycidae
- Subfamily: Cerambycinae
- Tribe: Callidiini
- Genus: Phymatodes
- Species: P. obliquus

Binomial name
- Phymatodes obliquus Casey, 1891

Synonyms
- Phymatodes decussatus Hatch, 1971; Phymatodes harfordi Lingafelter et al., 2014

= Phymatodes obliquus =

Species of beetle

Phymatodes obliquus is a species of longhorn beetle in the family Cerambycidae. It is found Pacific coastal area of North America and Baja California.
