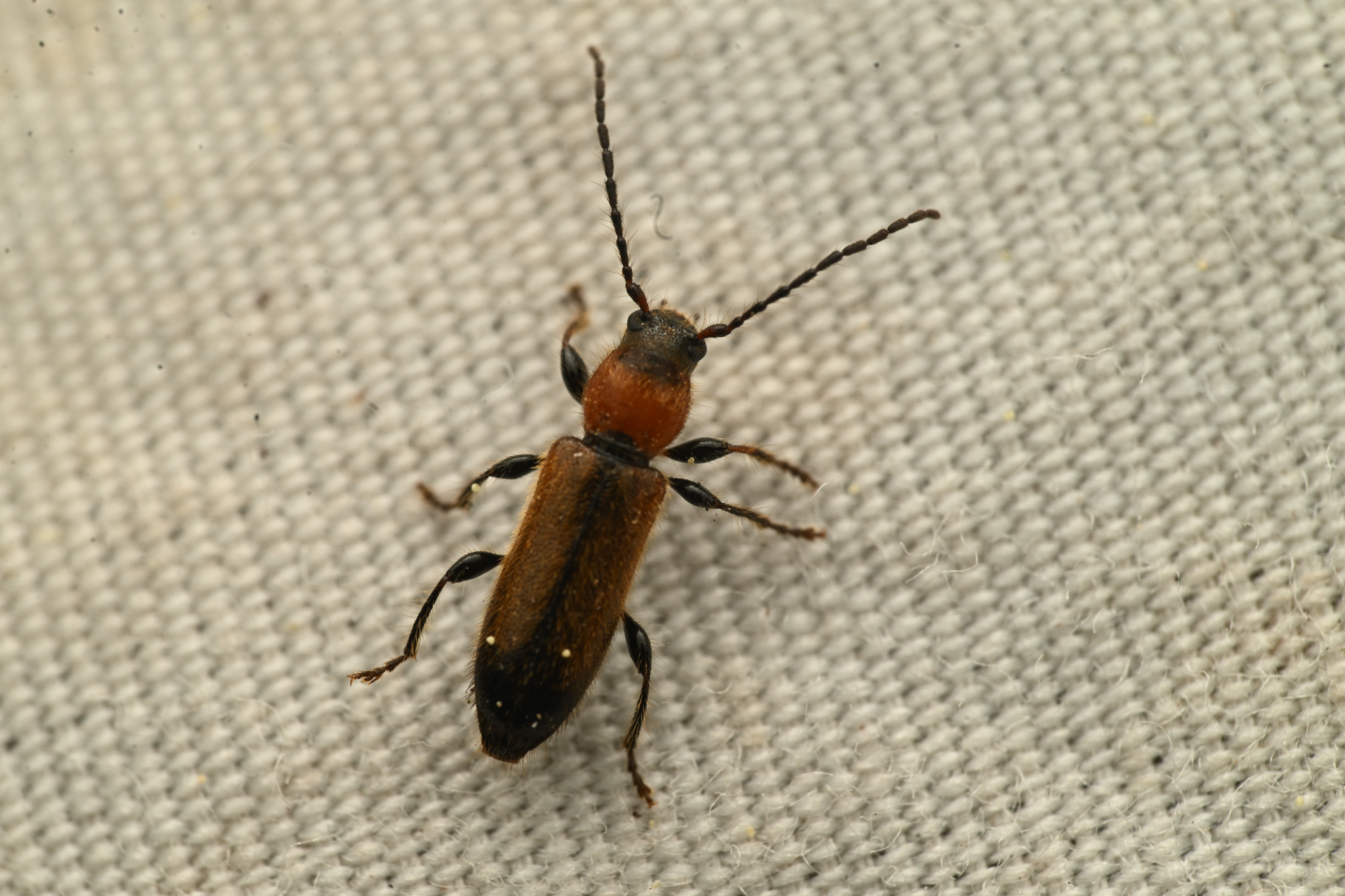

Scientific classification
- Kingdom: Animalia
- Phylum: Arthropoda
- Clade: Pancrustacea
- Class: Insecta
- Order: Coleoptera
- Suborder: Polyphaga
- Infraorder: Cucujiformia
- Family: Cerambycidae
- Subfamily: Cerambycinae
- Tribe: Callidiini
- Genus: Phymatodes
- Species: P. hirtellus

Binomial name
- Phymatodes hirtellus (LeConte, 1873)

Synonyms
- Callidium hirtellum Snow, 1906; Phymatodes densipennis Ross, 1968; Phymatodes ursae Chemsak, 1977; Phymatodis ursae Knull, 1940

= Phymatodes hirtellus =

Species of beetle

Phymatodes hirtellus is a species of longhorn beetle in the family Cerambycidae. This species has a single subspecies, Phymatodes hirtellus densipennis, found in California, Oregon, and Mexico (Baja California).
