= Semanotus juniperi =

Scientific classification
- Domain: Eukaryota
- Kingdom: Animalia
- Phylum: Arthropoda
- Class: Insecta
- Order: Coleoptera
- Suborder: Polyphaga
- Infraorder: Cucujiformia
- Family: Cerambycidae
- Genus: Semanotus
- Species: S. juniperi

Binomial name
- Semanotus juniperi (Fisher, 1915)

Synonyms
- Hylotrupes juniperi Fisher, 1915; Semanotus juniperi Van Dyke, 1923

Species of beetle

Semanotus juniperi is a species of beetle in the Callidiini subfamily. It was described by Fisher in 1915 and is endemic to Santa Catalina Mountains, Arizona.
