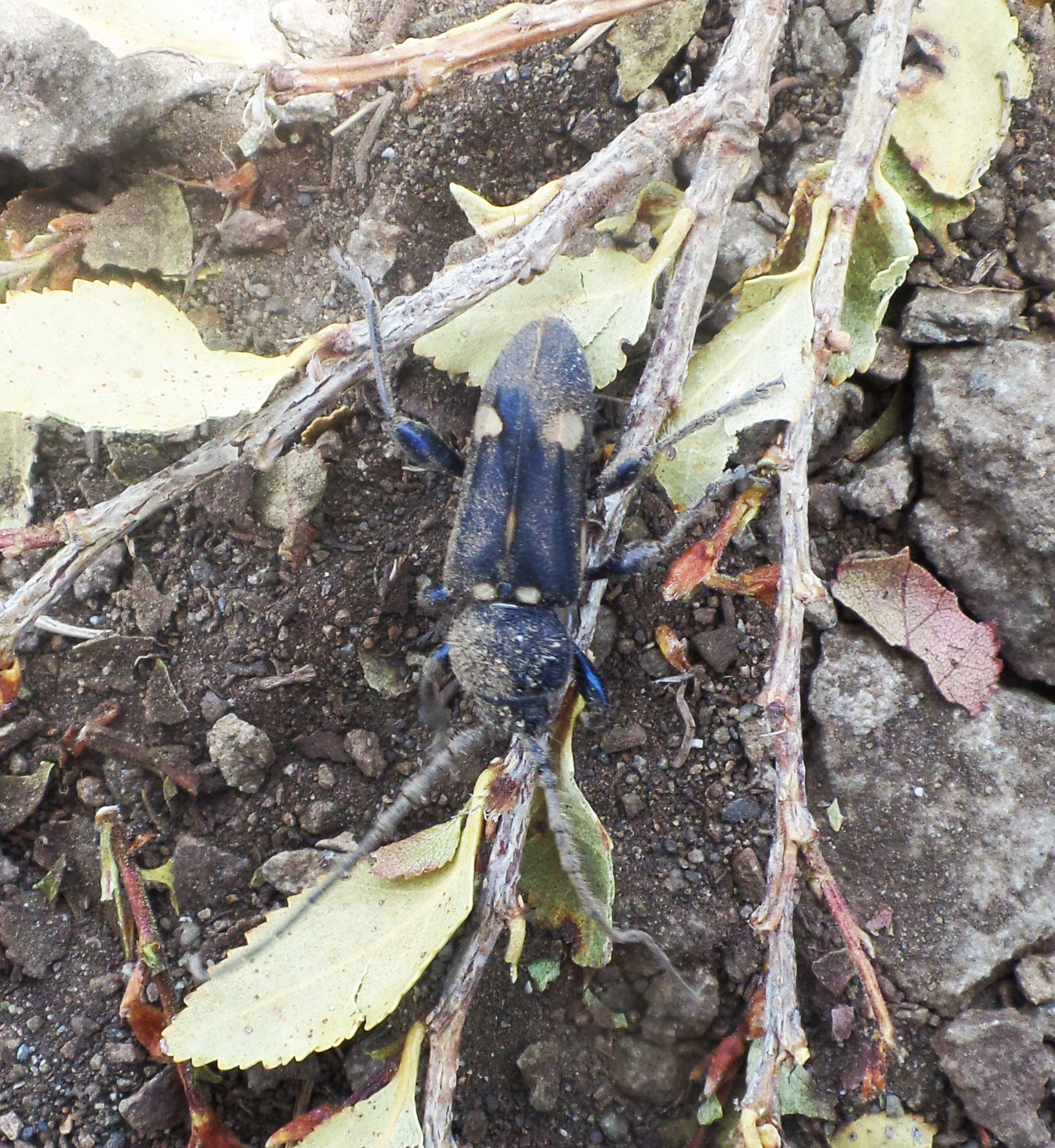
- Calydon globithorax, Chile

Scientific classification
- Kingdom: Animalia
- Phylum: Arthropoda
- Class: Insecta
- Order: Coleoptera
- Suborder: Polyphaga
- Infraorder: Cucujiformia
- Family: Cerambycidae
- Subfamily: Cerambycinae
- Tribe: Callidiini
- Genus: Calydon
- Species: C. globithorax

Binomial name
- Calydon globithorax (Fairmaire & Germain, 1861)

Synonyms
- Callidium globithorax Fairmaire & Germain, 1861; Calydon globithorax Bosq, 1953; Calydon globytorax Arias, 2000; Calydon nigricolle Blackwelder, 1946; Calydon skottsbergi Aurivillius, 1912; Calydon skottsbergi nigricollis Schwarzer, 1930; Mallosoma globithorax Gemminger & Harold, 1872

= Calydon globithorax =

Species of beetle

Calydon globithorax is a species of long-horned beetle in the beetle family Cerambycidae. It is found in Argentina and Chile.
