= Phymatodes ater =

Scientific classification
- Kingdom: Animalia
- Phylum: Arthropoda
- Class: Insecta
- Order: Coleoptera
- Suborder: Polyphaga
- Infraorder: Cucujiformia
- Family: Cerambycidae
- Subfamily: Cerambycinae
- Tribe: Callidiini
- Genus: Phymatodes
- Species: P. ater

Binomial name
- Phymatodes ater LeConte, 1884

Species of beetle

Phymatodes ater is a species of longhorn beetle in the family Cerambycidae. It is found in North America.

This species was described by John Lawrence LeConte in 1884.
