= Phymatodes decussatus =

Scientific classification
- Kingdom: Animalia
- Phylum: Arthropoda
- Class: Insecta
- Order: Coleoptera
- Suborder: Polyphaga
- Infraorder: Cucujiformia
- Family: Cerambycidae
- Subfamily: Cerambycinae
- Tribe: Callidiini
- Genus: Phymatodes
- Species: P. decussatus

Binomial name
- Phymatodes decussatus (LeConte, 1857)

Synonyms
- Callidium decussatum Gemminger & Harold, 1872; Phymatodes decussatus Casey, 1912; Phymatodes decussatus decussatus Hatch, 1971; Phymatodes fasciapilosus Van Dyke, 1920; Phymatodes juglandis Essig, 1926

Species of beetle

Phymatodes decussatus is a species of longhorn beetle in the family Cerambycidae. This species has a single subspecies, Phymatodes decussatus posticus, found in western North America and Mexico.
