= Phymatodes infuscatus =

Scientific classification
- Kingdom: Animalia
- Phylum: Arthropoda
- Class: Insecta
- Order: Coleoptera
- Suborder: Polyphaga
- Infraorder: Cucujiformia
- Family: Cerambycidae
- Subfamily: Cerambycinae
- Tribe: Callidiini
- Genus: Phymatodes
- Species: P. infuscatus

Binomial name
- Phymatodes infuscatus (LeConte, 1859)

Synonyms
- Callidium infuscatum LeConte, 1859; Phymatodes infuscatus Casey, 1912

Species of beetle

Phymatodes infuscatus is a species of longhorn beetle in the family Cerambycidae. It is found in the United States.
