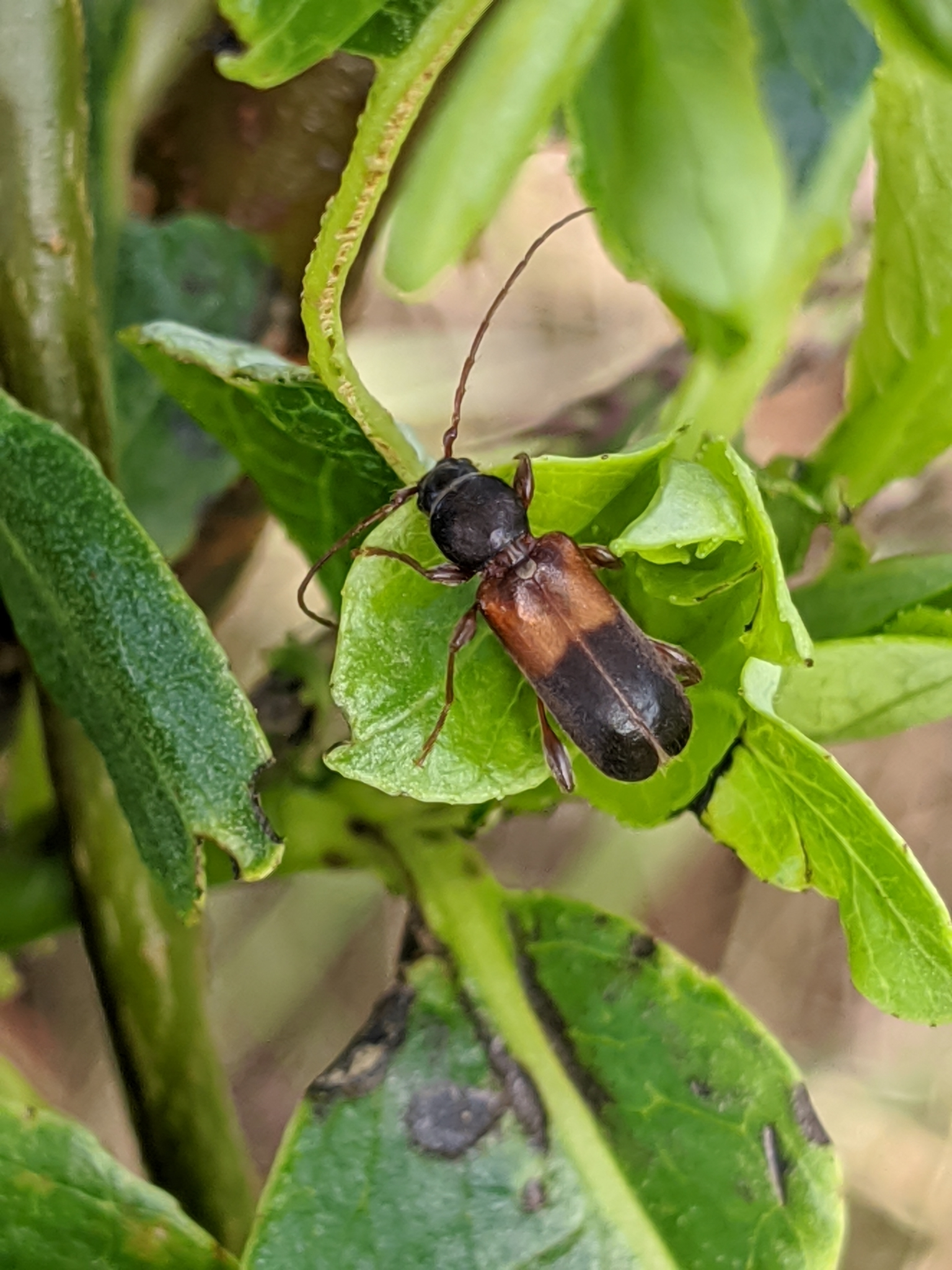
- Phymatodes dimidiatus, Alaska

Scientific classification
- Kingdom: Animalia
- Phylum: Arthropoda
- Class: Insecta
- Order: Coleoptera
- Suborder: Polyphaga
- Infraorder: Cucujiformia
- Family: Cerambycidae
- Subfamily: Cerambycinae
- Tribe: Callidiini
- Genus: Phymatodes
- Species: P. dimidiatus

Binomial name
- Phymatodes dimidiatus (Kirby, 1837)

Synonyms
- Callidium dimidiatum Gemminger & Harold, 1872; Callidium kalmii Schönherr, 1817; Callidium mannerheimi Gemminger & Harold, 1872; Callidium mannerheimii LeConte, 1857; Cerambyx bajulus Linnaeus, 1764; Clytus palliatus Haldeman, 1847; Phymatodes dimidiatum Bethune, 1872; Phymatodes dimidiatus Casey, 1912; Phymatodes frosti Lingafelter et al., 2014; Phymatodes kalmi Aurivillius, 1912; Phymatodes mannerheimi (LeConte, 1857); Phymatodes palliatus (Haldeman, 1847)

= Phymatodes dimidiatus =

Species of beetle

Phymatodes dimidiatus is a species of longhorn beetle in the family Cerambycidae. It is found in North America.
