= Phymatodes blandus =

Scientific classification
- Kingdom: Animalia
- Phylum: Arthropoda
- Class: Insecta
- Order: Coleoptera
- Suborder: Polyphaga
- Infraorder: Cucujiformia
- Family: Cerambycidae
- Subfamily: Cerambycinae
- Tribe: Callidiini
- Genus: Phymatodes
- Species: P. blandus

Binomial name
- Phymatodes blandus (LeConte, 1859)

Synonyms
- Callidium blandum Gemminger & Harold, 1872; Phymatodes blandus Casey, 1912; Phymatodes blandus blandus Linsley, 1964; Phymatodes blandus picipes Linsley, 1964; Phymatodes blandus propinquus Linsley, 1964; Phymatodes propinquus Linsley, 1934

Species of beetle

Phymatodes blandus is a species of longhorn beetle in the family Cerambycidae. It is found in the United States.
