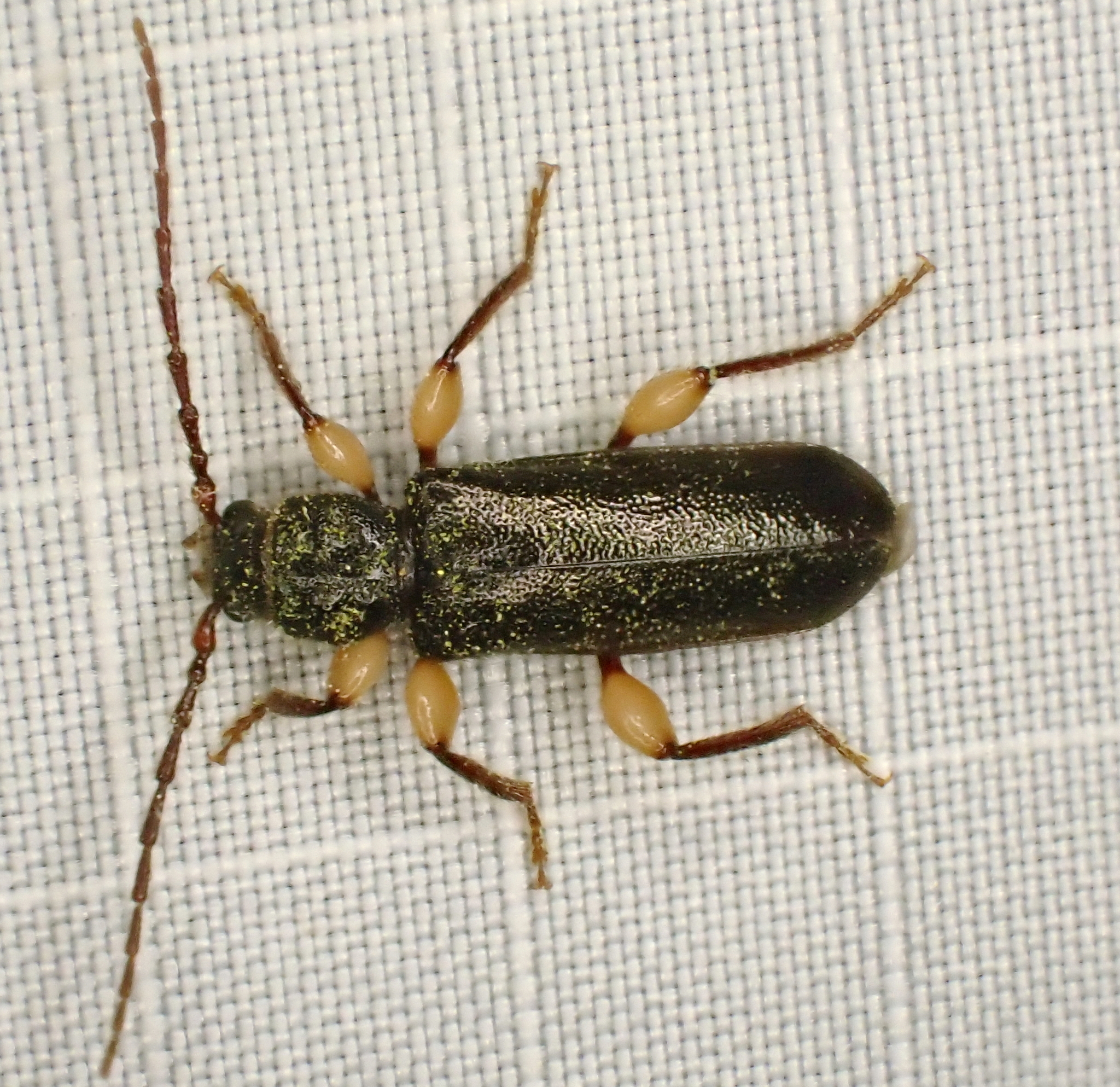
- Phymatodes aereus, Virginia

Scientific classification
- Kingdom: Animalia
- Phylum: Arthropoda
- Class: Insecta
- Order: Coleoptera
- Suborder: Polyphaga
- Infraorder: Cucujiformia
- Family: Cerambycidae
- Subfamily: Cerambycinae
- Tribe: Callidiini
- Genus: Phymatodes
- Species: P. aereus

Binomial name
- Phymatodes aereus (Newman, 1838)

Synonyms
- Callidium aereum Packard, 1890; Callidium pallipes Haldeman, 1847; Phymatodes aereum Britton, 1920; Phymatodes aereus Casey, 1912; Phymatodes pallipes (Haldeman, 1847)

= Phymatodes aereus =

Species of beetle

Phymatodes aereus is a species of longhorn beetle in the family Cerambycidae. It is found in North America.
