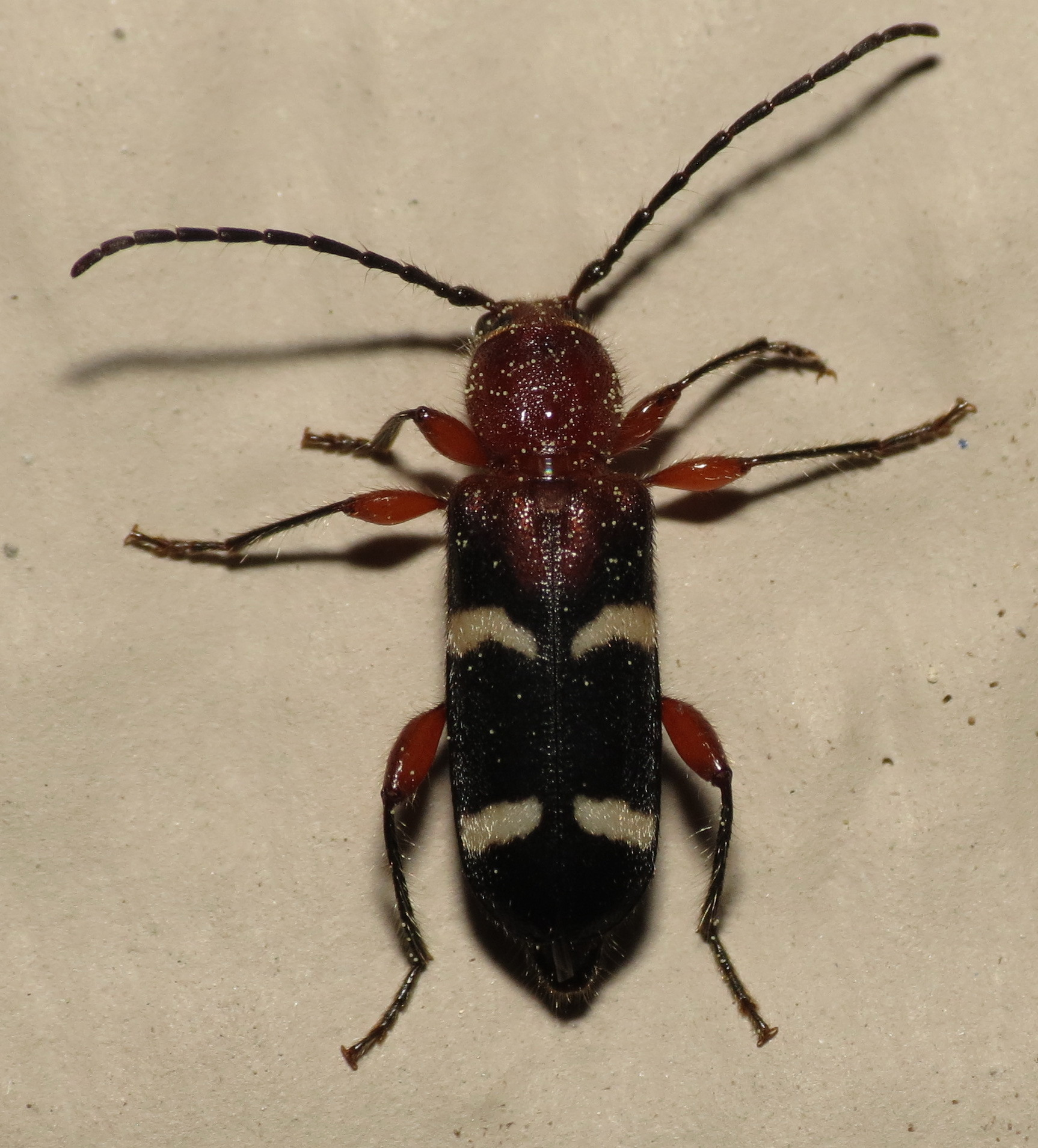
- Phymatodes varius, Virginia

Scientific classification
- Kingdom: Animalia
- Phylum: Arthropoda
- Class: Insecta
- Order: Coleoptera
- Suborder: Polyphaga
- Infraorder: Cucujiformia
- Family: Cerambycidae
- Subfamily: Cerambycinae
- Tribe: Callidiini
- Genus: Phymatodes
- Species: P. varius

Binomial name
- Phymatodes varius (Fabricius, 1776)

Synonyms
- Callidium albofasciatum Gemminger & Harold, 1872; Callidium semicirculare Gemminger & Harold, 1872; Callidium semicircularis Packard, 1872; Callidium subfasciellum White, 1855; Callidium varium Olivier, 1790; Cerambyx versicolor Gmelin, 1790; Phymatodes albofasciatum (Bland, 1862); Phymatodes latipennis Lingafelter et al., 2014; Phymatodes semicircularis Aurivillius, 1912; Phymatodes subfasciellum (White, 1855); Phymatodes varia Blackwelder, 1946; Phymatodes varians Beaulne, 1932; Phymatodes varius Casey, 1912; Phymatodes varius albofasciatus Frost & Dietrich, 1929; Phymatodes varius diffidens Casey, 1912; Phymatodes versicolor (Gmelin, 1790)

= Phymatodes varius =

Species of beetle

Phymatodes varius is a species of longhorn beetle in the family Cerambycidae. It is found in North America.
