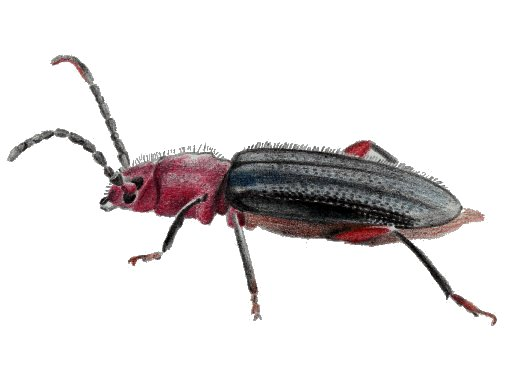
- Phymatodes amoenus

Scientific classification
- Kingdom: Animalia
- Phylum: Arthropoda
- Class: Insecta
- Order: Coleoptera
- Suborder: Polyphaga
- Infraorder: Cucujiformia
- Family: Cerambycidae
- Subfamily: Cerambycinae
- Tribe: Callidiini
- Genus: Phymatodes
- Species: P. amoenus

Binomial name
- Phymatodes amoenus (Say, 1824)

Synonyms
- Callidium amoenum Haldeman, 1847; Eriphus coccineicollis Haldeman, 1847; Phymatodes amoeans Jülich, 1880; Phymatodes amoenus Casey, 1912; Phymatodes amoenus hudsonicus Casey, 1912; Phymatodes coccineicollis (Haldeman, 1847)

= Phymatodes amoenus =

Species of beetle

Phymatodes amoenus, the grapevine phymatodes, is a species of longhorn beetle in the family Cerambycidae. It is found in North America.
