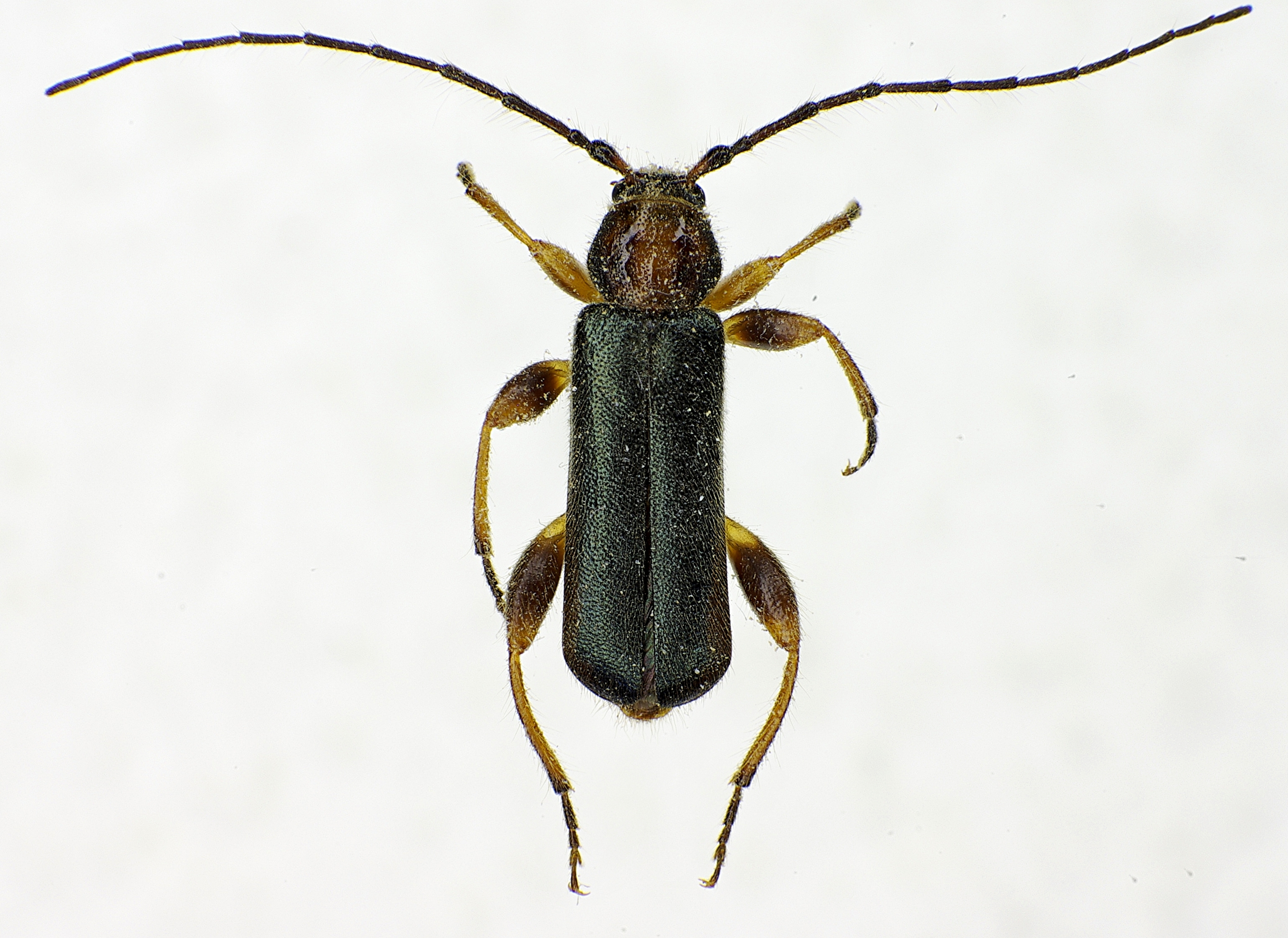
- Phymatodes lividus

Scientific classification
- Domain: Eukaryota
- Kingdom: Animalia
- Phylum: Arthropoda
- Class: Insecta
- Order: Coleoptera
- Suborder: Polyphaga
- Infraorder: Cucujiformia
- Family: Cerambycidae
- Subfamily: Cerambycinae
- Tribe: Callidiini
- Genus: Phymatodes
- Species: P. lividus

Binomial name
- Phymatodes lividus (Rossi, 1794)

= Phymatodes lividus =

Species of beetle

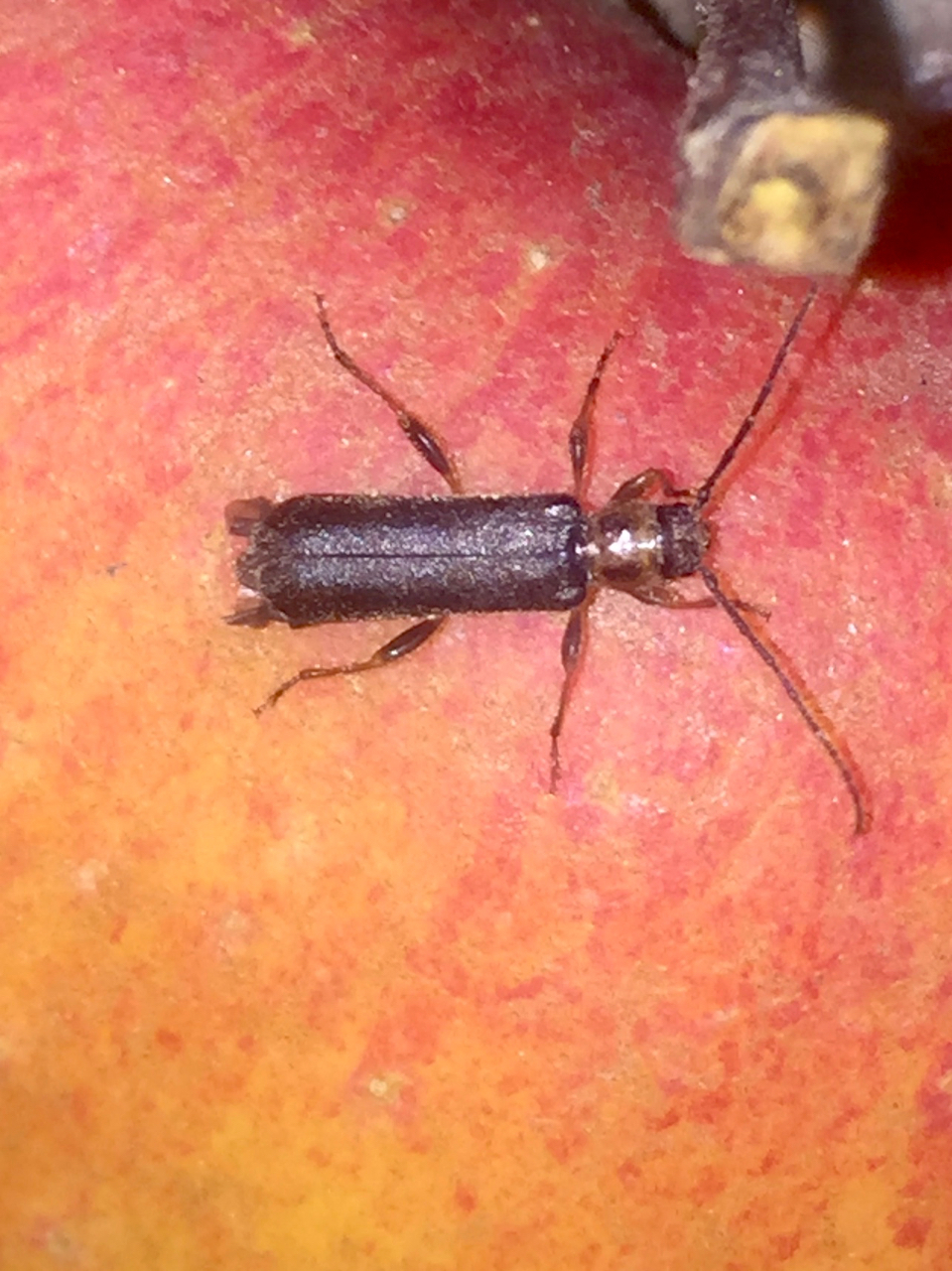
Phymatodes lividus, Italy

Phymatodes lividus is a species of longhorn beetle in the family Cerambycidae. It is native to Europe and the Palearctic, and adventive to Eastern North America, southern Brazil, Argentina, and Uruguay.
