= Ropalopus sanguinicollis =

Scientific classification
- Domain: Eukaryota
- Kingdom: Animalia
- Phylum: Arthropoda
- Class: Insecta
- Order: Coleoptera
- Suborder: Polyphaga
- Infraorder: Cucujiformia
- Family: Cerambycidae
- Subfamily: Cerambycinae
- Tribe: Callidiini
- Genus: Ropalopus
- Species: R. sanguinicollis

Binomial name
- Ropalopus sanguinicollis (Horn, 1860)

Species of beetle

Ropalopus sanguinicollis is a species of long-horned beetle in the family Cerambycidae. It is found in the northeastern United States and southern Canada.
