= Xylocrius cribratus =

Scientific classification
- Kingdom: Animalia
- Phylum: Arthropoda
- Class: Insecta
- Order: Coleoptera
- Suborder: Polyphaga
- Infraorder: Cucujiformia
- Family: Cerambycidae
- Subfamily: Cerambycinae
- Tribe: Callidiini
- Genus: Xylocrius
- Species: X. cribratus

Binomial name
- Xylocrius cribratus LeConte, 1873

Synonyms
- Callidium cribratum Lameere, 1883; Hylocrius cribratus Lameere, 1883

Species of beetle

Xylocrius cribratus is a species of longhorn beetle in the family Cerambycidae. It is found in the United States.
