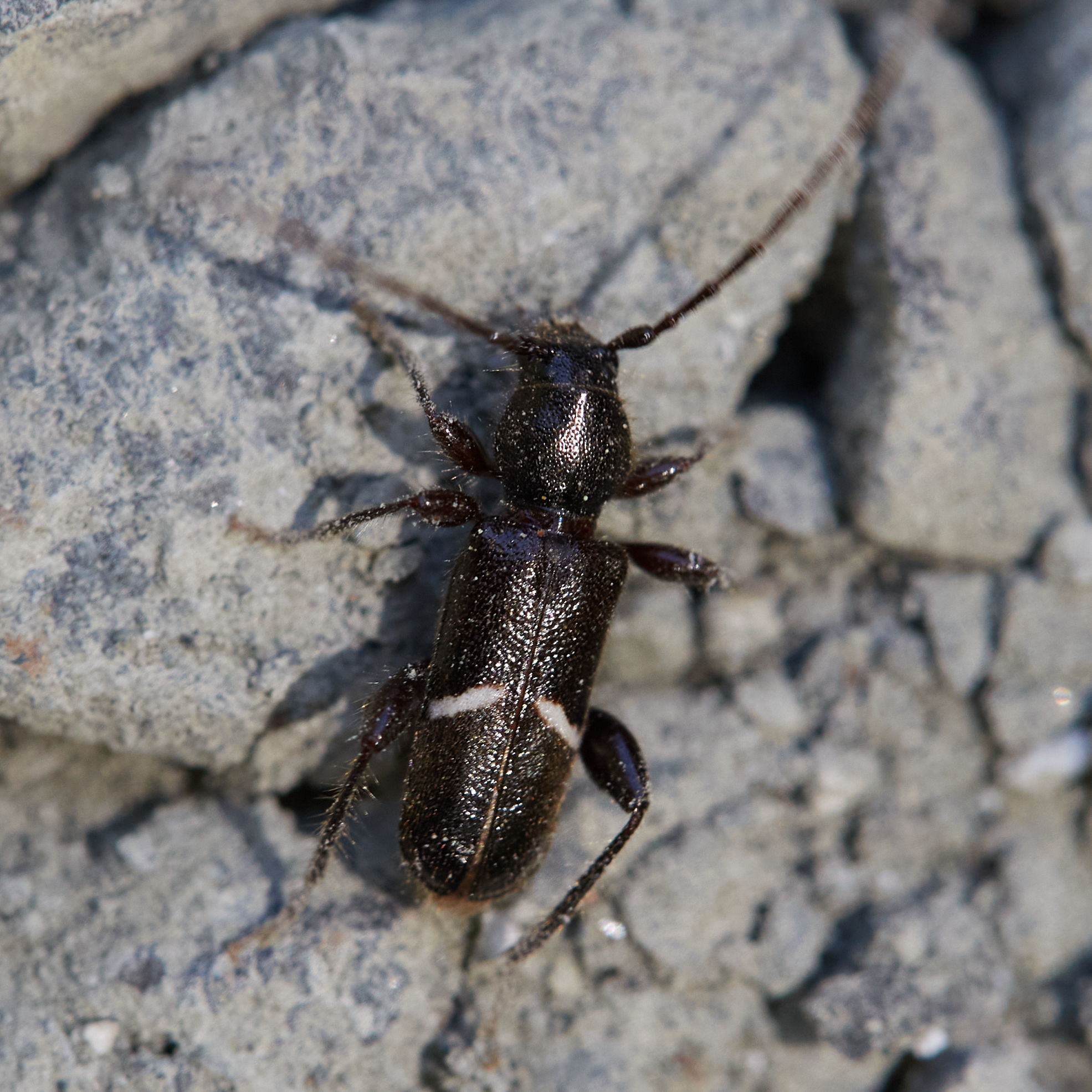
- Phymatodes vulneratus, California

Scientific classification
- Kingdom: Animalia
- Phylum: Arthropoda
- Class: Insecta
- Order: Coleoptera
- Suborder: Polyphaga
- Infraorder: Cucujiformia
- Family: Cerambycidae
- Subfamily: Cerambycinae
- Tribe: Callidiini
- Genus: Phymatodes
- Species: P. vulneratus

Binomial name
- Phymatodes vulneratus (LeConte, 1857)

Synonyms
- Callidium vulneratum Gemminger & Harold, 1872; Phymatodes concinnus Lingafelter et al., 2014; Phymatodes vulnerata Van Dyke, 1925; Phymatodes vulneratus Casey, 1912

= Phymatodes vulneratus =

Species of beetle

Phymatodes vulneratus is a species of longhorn beetle in the family Cerambycidae. It is found in Canada and the United States.
