= Phymatodes vilitatis =

Scientific classification
- Kingdom: Animalia
- Phylum: Arthropoda
- Class: Insecta
- Order: Coleoptera
- Suborder: Polyphaga
- Infraorder: Cucujiformia
- Family: Cerambycidae
- Subfamily: Cerambycinae
- Tribe: Callidiini
- Genus: Phymatodes
- Species: P. vilitatis

Binomial name
- Phymatodes vilitatis Linsley, 1940

Synonyms
- Callidium vile Aurivillius, 1912; Phymatodes vile (LeConte, 1873)

Species of beetle

Phymatodes vilitatis is a species of longhorn beetle in the family Cerambycidae. It is found in the United States.
