= Phymatodes aeneus =

Scientific classification
- Kingdom: Animalia
- Phylum: Arthropoda
- Class: Insecta
- Order: Coleoptera
- Suborder: Polyphaga
- Infraorder: Cucujiformia
- Family: Cerambycidae
- Subfamily: Cerambycinae
- Tribe: Callidiini
- Genus: Phymatodes
- Species: P. aeneus

Binomial name
- Phymatodes aeneus LeConte, 1854

Synonyms
- Callidium aeneum Gemminger & Harold, 1872; Phymatodes aeneus Casey, 1912

Species of beetle

Phymatodes aeneus is a species of longhorn beetle in the family Cerambycidae, found in North America.

This species was described by John Lawrence LeConte in 1854.
