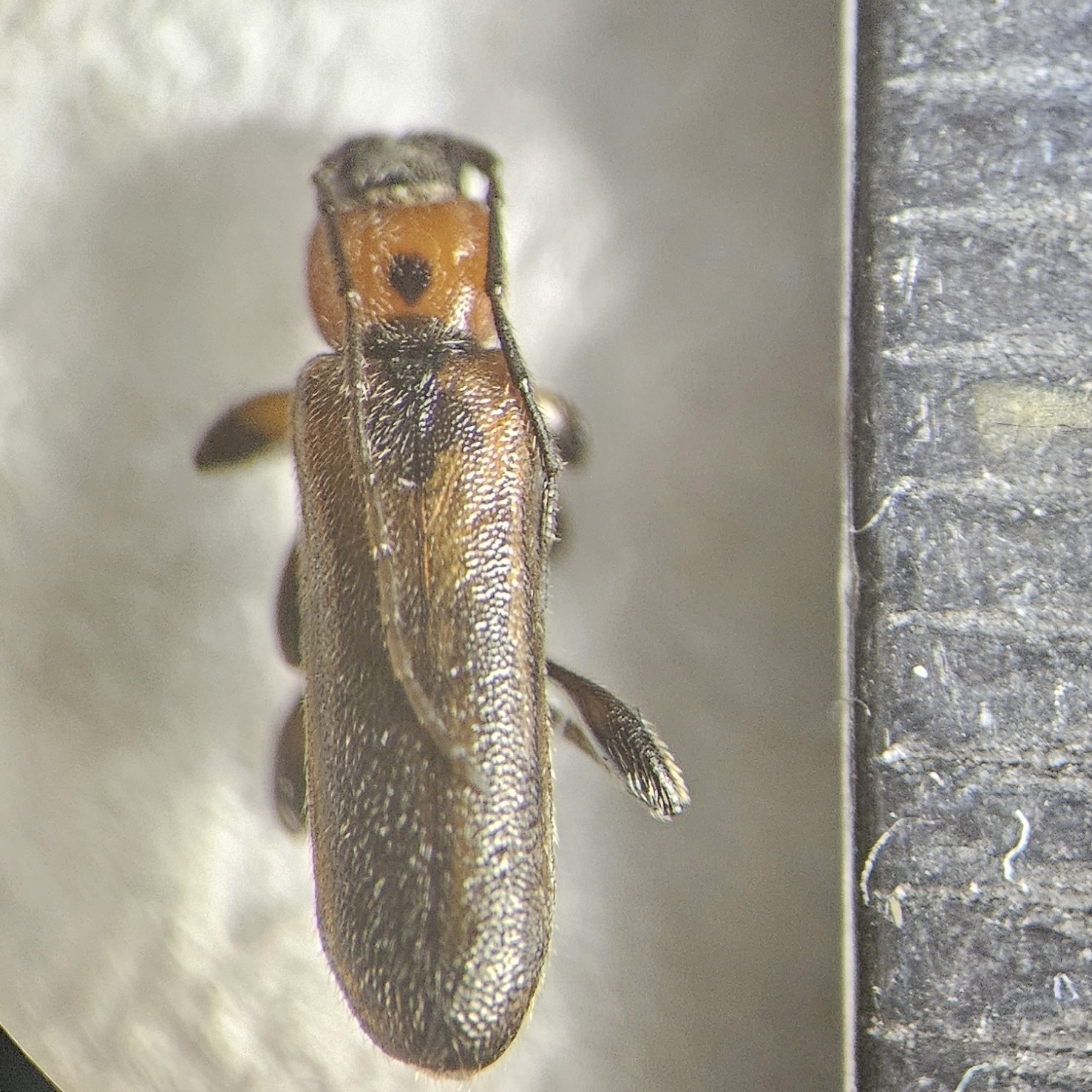
- Phymatodes maculicollis, California

Scientific classification
- Kingdom: Animalia
- Phylum: Arthropoda
- Class: Insecta
- Order: Coleoptera
- Suborder: Polyphaga
- Infraorder: Cucujiformia
- Family: Cerambycidae
- Subfamily: Cerambycinae
- Tribe: Callidiini
- Genus: Phymatodes
- Species: P. maculicollis

Binomial name
- Phymatodes maculicollis LeConte, 1878

Synonyms
- Callidium hardyi Hardy, 1944; Callidium maculicollis Lameere, 1883; Phymatodes elongatus Ruette, 1970; Phymatodes hardyi Keen, 1952

= Phymatodes maculicollis =

Species of beetle

Phymatodes maculicollis is a species of Long-Horned Beetle in the beetle family Cerambycidae, found in North America.
