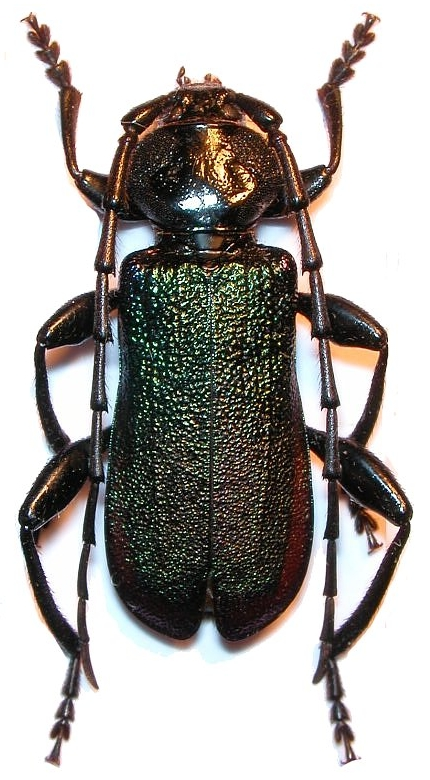
- Male Specimen of Ropalopus Insubricus

Conservation status
- Near Threatened (IUCN 3.1)

Scientific classification
- Kingdom: Animalia
- Phylum: Arthropoda
- Clade: Pancrustacea
- Class: Insecta
- Order: Coleoptera
- Suborder: Polyphaga
- Infraorder: Cucujiformia
- Family: Cerambycidae
- Genus: Ropalopus
- Species: R. insubricus

Binomial name
- Ropalopus insubricus Ernst Friedrich Germar, 1824

Synonyms
- Callidium insubricum Germar, 1824; Ropalopus ungaricus insubricus Germar, 1824; Callidium fischeri Krynicki, 1829; Ropalopus insubricus fischeri Krynicki, 1829; Ropalopus insubricus var. viridipennis Pic, 1926; Rhopalopus viridipennis Pic, 1926

= Ropalopus insubricus =

Rare species of longhorn beetle

Ropalopus insubricus is a rare species of European long-horned beetle in the family Cerambycidae. It was first documented by Ernst Friedrich Germar in 1824 and first assessed for the IUCN Red List in 2009. The species is quite rare in Europe and is classified as Near Threatened.

== Description ==
Ropalopus insubricus is a species within the genus Ropalopus. It is characterized by its distinct morphological features. The species measures between 14 and 31 mm (0.55 and 1.22 in) in length, it is identified by densely reticulated elytra lacking wrinkles in the basal half. The pronotum is unevenly tapered, featuring a large rhomboid area with slight punctation. In males, the lustrous pronotum contrasts with other subspecies, and the antennae are notably longer than the elytra. Pronotum stains are characterized by deeper punctation, narrow irregularities, and a non-merging pattern. Ropalopus insubricus is diurnal, with the species being particularly active during the warm daylight hours.

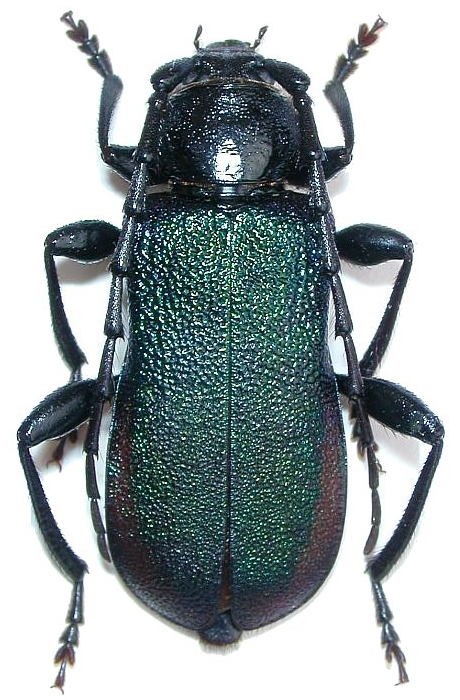
Female

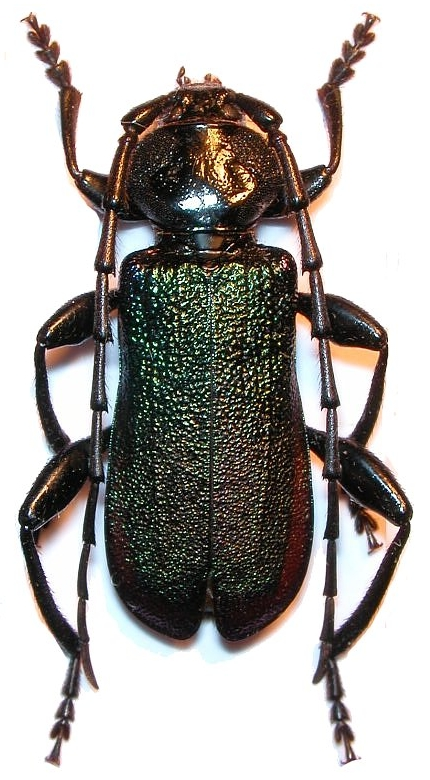
Male

== Life cycle ==
The life cycle of the Ropalopus insubricus beetle species spans 2 to 3 years. Adult beetles emerge ready to fly between May and August. The larvae of Ropalopus insubricus undergo development in damaged sections of living trees, pupating in the heartwoods under the bark. Observed variations in the pronotum and elytra shape, as well as the distinct body coloration, within the same population are likely a result of larval development and pupation occurring under the bark and inside the wood of living trees, exposing the immature stages to different pressures.

== Distribution and habitat ==
Ropalopus insubricus, classified as an obligate saproxylic species, demonstrates a strong dependence on decaying wood throughout its life stages. Preferring mountainous environments, this species is prevalent from northern Italy through Slovakia to Hungary and the Balkans, extending into westernmost Turkey. The species is extremely rare only having two recorded occurrences in Turkey over the past 114 years. Host trees, particularly broad-leaved species such as Acer, Ficus, Fraxinus, Alnus, and Fagus, play a crucial role in supporting the life cycle of this species.

Ropalopus insubricus exhibits a degree of adaptability beyond montane habitats, as evidenced by its presence on road verges or Ficus plantations. Suspected to require a warm climate at low altitude for optimal development, Ropalopus insubricus is distributed across more temperate regions of Europe. Ropalopus insubricus can only be found at elevations lower than 600 metres (1,970 ft) above sea level.

== Conservation status ==
Ropalopus insubricus is classified as Near Threatened on the IUCN Red List due to the rarity of the species. Deforestation and forest fragmentation are contributing factors to its classification.

== See also ==
- Ernst Friedrich Germar
- Ropalopus
- Longhorn beetle
