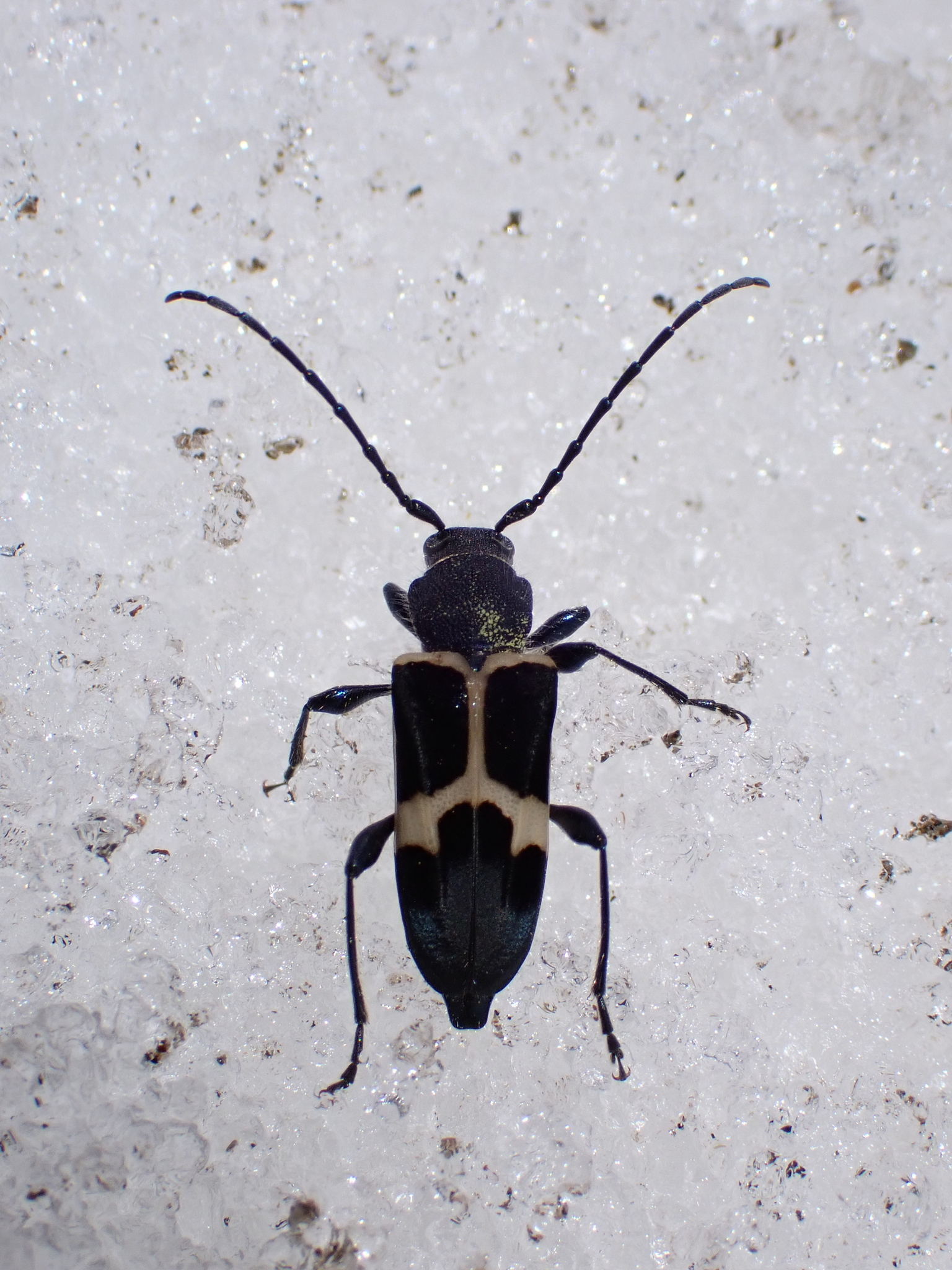
- Calydon submetallicum, Chile

Scientific classification
- Kingdom: Animalia
- Phylum: Arthropoda
- Class: Insecta
- Order: Coleoptera
- Suborder: Polyphaga
- Infraorder: Cucujiformia
- Family: Cerambycidae
- Genus: Calydon
- Species: C. submetallicum

Binomial name
- Calydon submetallicum (Blanchard, 1851)

Synonyms
- Calidon submetallicum Delfín, 1900; Callidium submetallicum Strauch, 1861; Calydon submetallicum Bosq, 1953; Mallosoma submetallicum White, 1853

= Calydon submetallicum =

Species of beetle

Calydon submetallicum is a species of long-horned beetle in the beetle family Cerambycidae. It is found in Argentina and Chile.
