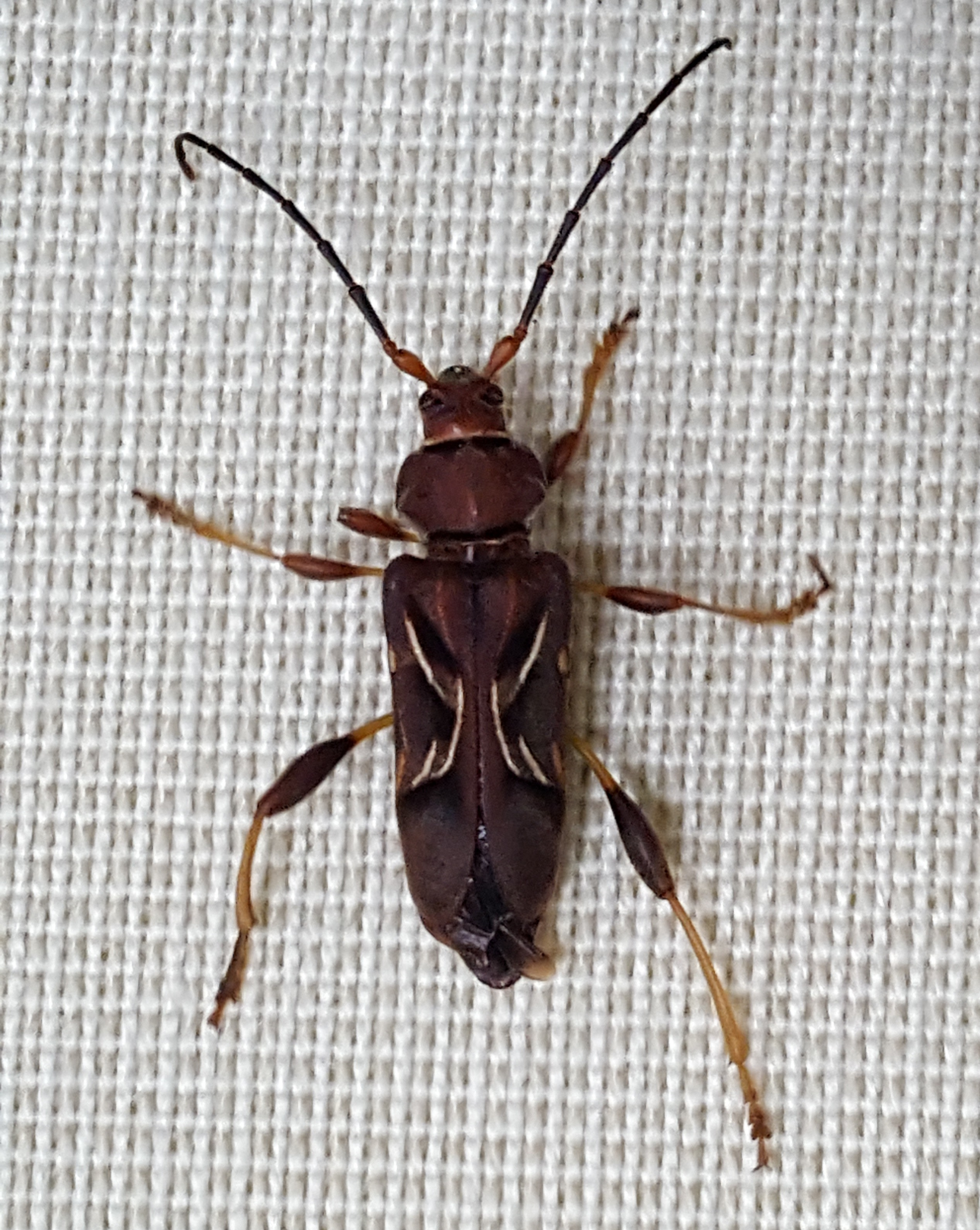
- Physocnemum andreae

Scientific classification
- Kingdom: Animalia
- Phylum: Arthropoda
- Class: Insecta
- Order: Coleoptera
- Suborder: Polyphaga
- Infraorder: Cucujiformia
- Family: Cerambycidae
- Subfamily: Cerambycinae
- Tribe: Callidiini
- Genus: Physocnemum; Haldeman, 1847

Synonyms
- Dularius Thomson, 1860

= Physocnemum =

Genus of beetles

Physocnemum is a genus of beetles in the family Cerambycidae. There are three described species in Physocnemum, found in North America.

- Physocnemum andreae (Haldeman, 1847)
- Physocnemum brevilineum (Say, 1824)
- Physocnemum violaceipenne Hamilton, 1896
