= Semanotus japonicus =

Scientific classification
- Domain: Eukaryota
- Kingdom: Animalia
- Phylum: Arthropoda
- Class: Insecta
- Order: Coleoptera
- Suborder: Polyphaga
- Infraorder: Cucujiformia
- Family: Cerambycidae
- Genus: Semanotus
- Species: S. japonicus

Binomial name
- Semanotus japonicus Lacordaire, 1869

Species of beetle

Semanotus japonicus is a species of beetle in the family Cerambycidae.

The beetle occurs naturally on Honshu, Shikoku, Sado Island, Oki Island and Yaku Island in Japan. Its main host tree is the Japanese cedar, Cryptomeria japonica.
