= Callidiellum cupressi =

Scientific classification
- Domain: Eukaryota
- Kingdom: Animalia
- Phylum: Arthropoda
- Class: Insecta
- Order: Coleoptera
- Suborder: Polyphaga
- Infraorder: Cucujiformia
- Family: Cerambycidae
- Genus: Callidiellum
- Species: C. cupressi

Binomial name
- Callidiellum cupressi (Van Dyke, 1923)

Species of beetle

Callidiellum cupressi is a species of beetle in the family Cerambycidae. It was described by Van Dyke in 1923.
