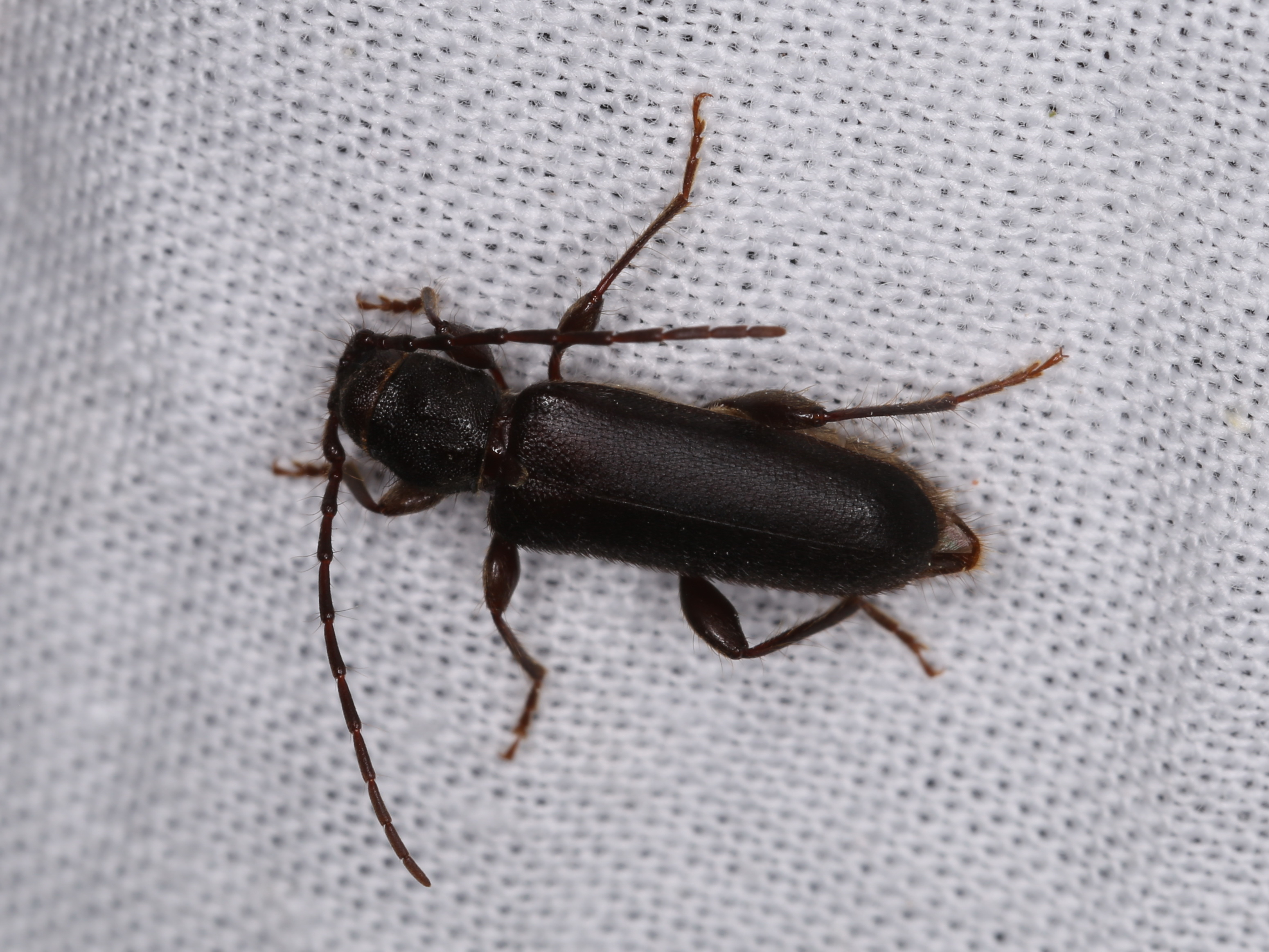

Scientific classification
- Kingdom: Animalia
- Phylum: Arthropoda
- Class: Insecta
- Order: Coleoptera
- Suborder: Polyphaga
- Infraorder: Cucujiformia
- Family: Cerambycidae
- Genus: Phymatodes
- Species: P. grandis

Binomial name
- Phymatodes grandis Casey, 1912

Synonyms
- Phymatodes lecontei Linsley, 1938; Phymatodes obscurum LeConte, 1859

= Phymatodes grandis =

Species of beetle

Phymatodes grandis is a species of beetle in the family Cerambycidae. It was described by Casey in 1912. Like many longhorn beetle species, the males produce aggregation-sex pheromones.
