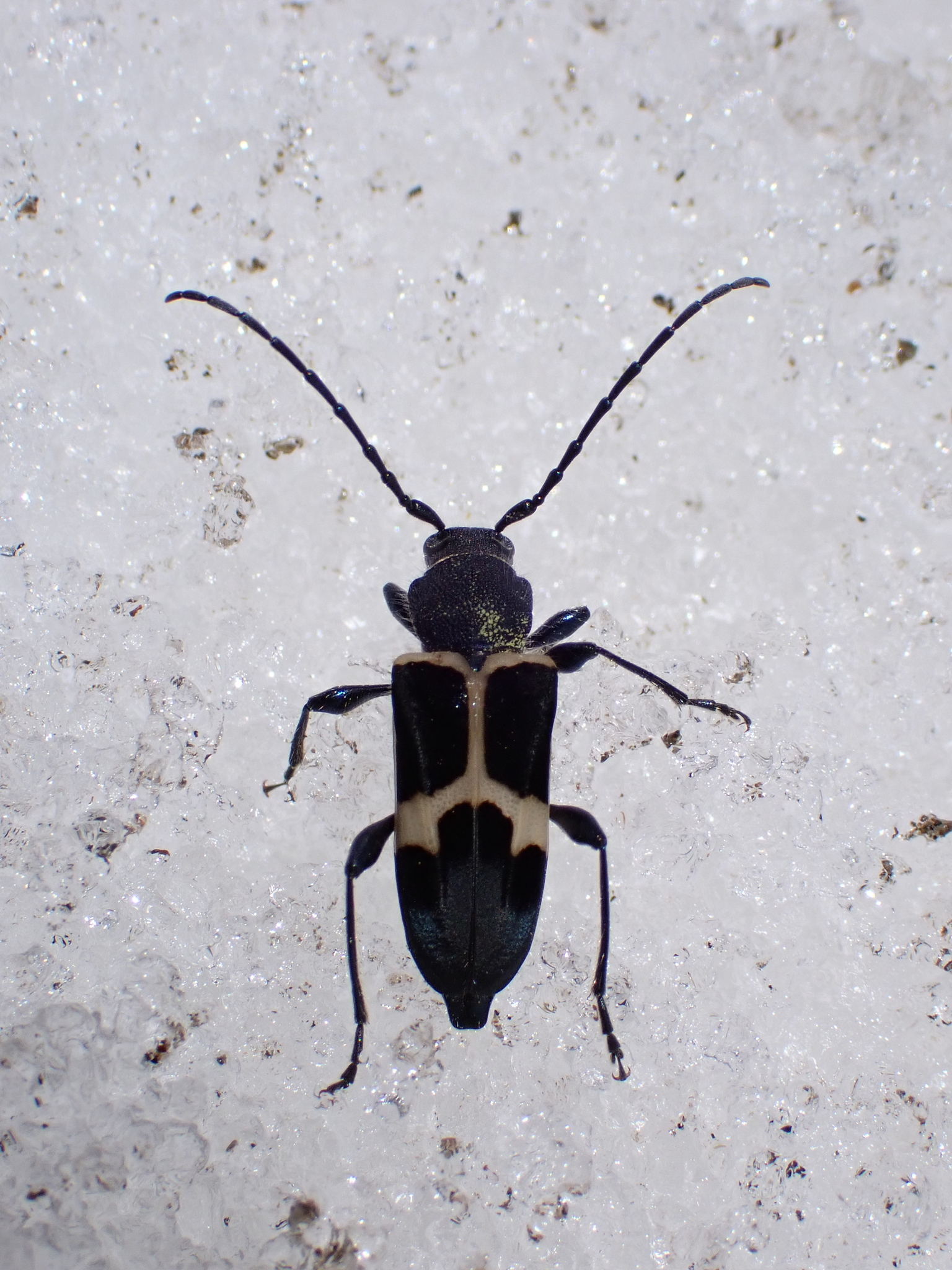
- Calydon submetallicum, Chile

Scientific classification
- Domain: Eukaryota
- Kingdom: Animalia
- Phylum: Arthropoda
- Class: Insecta
- Order: Coleoptera
- Suborder: Polyphaga
- Infraorder: Cucujiformia
- Family: Cerambycidae
- Subfamily: Cerambycinae
- Tribe: Callidiini
- Genus: Calydon; Thomson, 1864

= Calydon (beetle) =

Genus of beetles

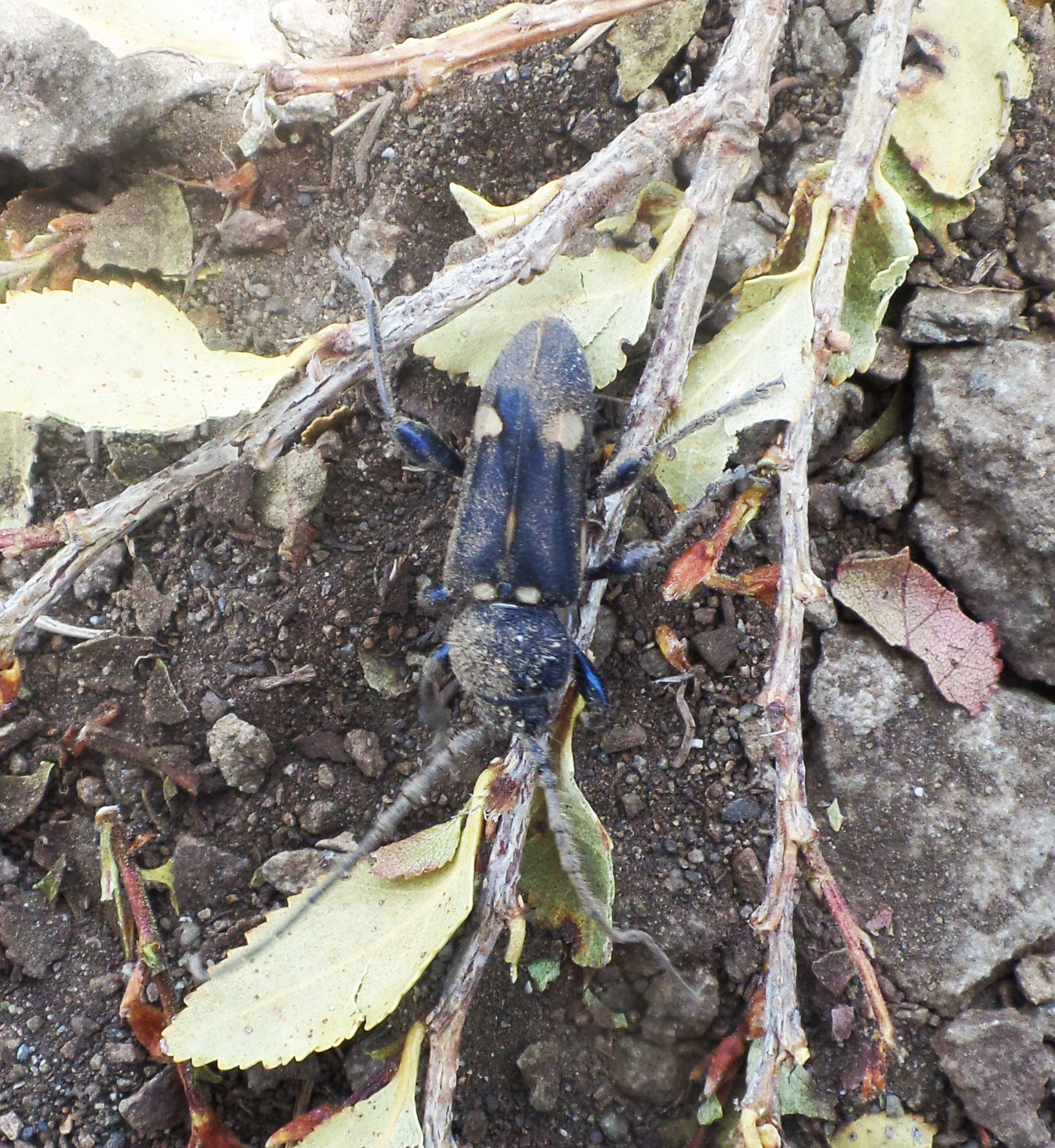
Calydon globithorax, Chile

Calydon (/ˈkælɪdɒn/) is a genus of longhorn beetles in the family Cerambycidae. There are at least two described species in Calydon, found in Argentina and Chile).

== Species ==
These two species belong to the genus Calydon:

- Calydon globithorax (Fairmaire & Germain, 1861)
- Calydon submetallicum (Blanchard, 1851)
