= Xylocrius =

Scientific classification
- Kingdom: Animalia
- Phylum: Arthropoda
- Class: Insecta
- Order: Coleoptera
- Suborder: Polyphaga
- Infraorder: Cucujiformia
- Family: Cerambycidae
- Subfamily: Cerambycinae
- Tribe: Callidiini
- Genus: Xylocrius; LeConte, 1873

Synonyms
- Hylocrius Lameere, 1883

Genus of beetles

Xylocrius is a genus of longhorn beetles in the family Cerambycidae. There are at least two described species in Xylocrius, found in North America.

== Species ==
These two species belong to the genus Xylocrius:

- Xylocrius agassizii (LeConte, 1861)
- Xylocrius cribratus LeConte, 1873
