= Physocnemum brevilineum =

Scientific classification
- Domain: Eukaryota
- Kingdom: Animalia
- Phylum: Arthropoda
- Class: Insecta
- Order: Coleoptera
- Suborder: Polyphaga
- Infraorder: Cucujiformia
- Family: Cerambycidae
- Genus: Physocnemum
- Species: P. brevilineum

Binomial name
- Physocnemum brevilineum (Say, 1824)

Synonyms
- Physocnemum angulatum Casey, 1924; Physocnemum compressipes Casey, 1912; Physocnemum densum Casey, 1912; Physocnemum longitarse Casey, 1924; Physocnemum pictum Casey, 1924

Species of beetle

Physocnemum brevilineum is a species of beetle in the family Cerambycidae.
