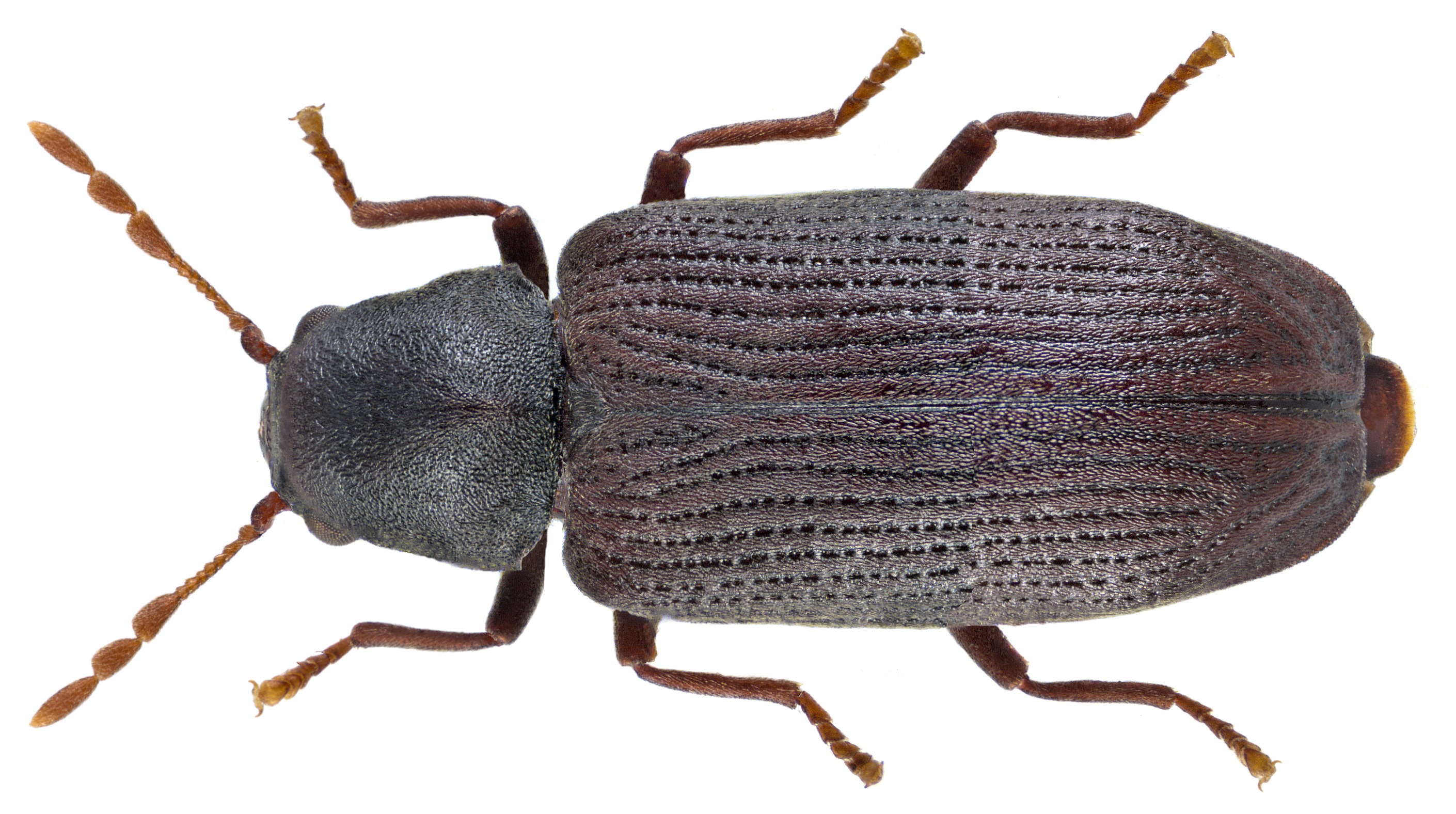
- Hemicoelus fulvicornis

Scientific classification
- Kingdom: Animalia
- Phylum: Arthropoda
- Class: Insecta
- Order: Coleoptera
- Suborder: Polyphaga
- Family: Ptinidae
- Subfamily: Anobiinae
- Tribe: Anobiini
- Genus: Hemicoelus; LeConte, 1861

Synonyms
- Cacotemnus LeConte, 1861

= Hemicoelus =

Genus of beetles

Hemicoelus is a genus of death-watch beetles in the family Ptinidae. There are about 12 described species in Hemicoelus.

== Species ==
These 12 species belong to the genus Hemicoelus:

- Hemicoelus canaliculatus (Thomson, 1863)^{g}
- Hemicoelus carinatus (Say, 1823)^{i c g b} (eastern deathwatch beetle)
- Hemicoelus costatus (Aragona, 1830)^{g}
- Hemicoelus defectus (Fall, 1905)^{i c g b}
- Hemicoelus favonii Bukejs, Alekseev, Cooper, King & Mckellar, 2017^{g}
- Hemicoelus fulvicornis (Sturm, 1837)^{g}
- Hemicoelus gibbicollis (LeConte, 1859)^{i c g b} (California deathwatch beetle)
- Hemicoelus laticollis (Fall, 1905)^{i c g}
- Hemicoelus nelsoni (Hatch, 1961)^{i c g}
- Hemicoelus pusillus (Fall, 1905)^{i c g b}
- Hemicoelus rufipennis (Duftschmid, 1825)^{g}
- Hemicoelus umbrosus (Fall, 1905)^{i c g}

Data sources: i = ITIS, c = Catalogue of Life, g = GBIF, b = Bugguide.net
