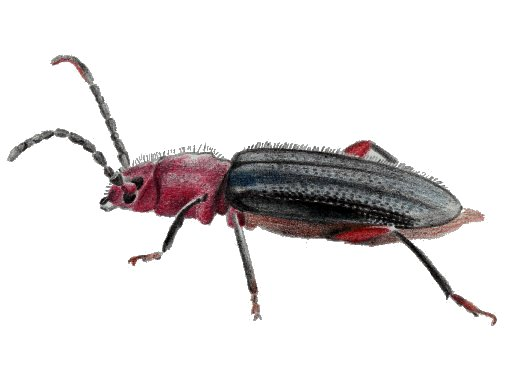
- Phymatodes amoenus

Scientific classification
- Domain: Eukaryota
- Kingdom: Animalia
- Phylum: Arthropoda
- Class: Insecta
- Order: Coleoptera
- Suborder: Polyphaga
- Infraorder: Cucujiformia
- Family: Cerambycidae
- Subfamily: Cerambycinae
- Tribe: Callidiini
- Genus: Phymatodes; Mulsant, 1839

Subgenera
- Melasmetus Reitter, 1912; Paraphymatodes Plavilstshikov, 1934; Phymatodellus Reitter, 1912; Phymatoderus Reitter, 1912; Poecilium Fairmaire, 1868

Synonyms
- Poecilium Fairmaire, 1868; Melasmetus Reitter, 1912; Microcallidium Casey, 1912; Paraphymatodes Plavilstshikov, 1934; Phymatodellus Reitter, 1912; Phymatoderus Reitter, 1912; Phymatodes Dejean, 1835; Phymatodina Casey, 1912; Phymotoderus Reitter, 1912; Pseudopoecilium Planet, 1924

= Phymatodes =

Genus of beetles

Phymatodes is a genus of longhorn beetles in the family Cerambycidae. There are more than 50 described species in Phymatodes, found throughout much of the northern hemisphere.

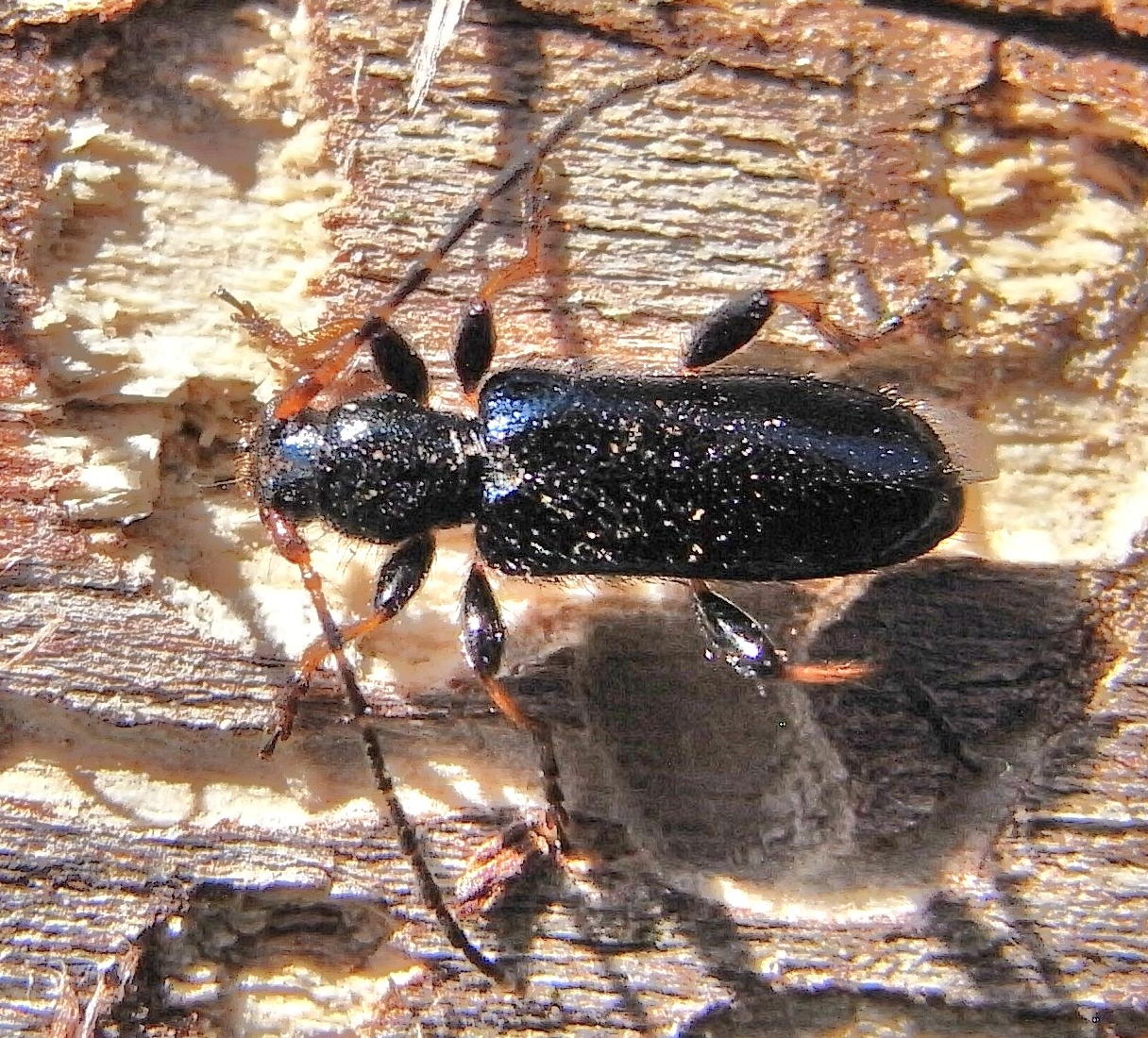
Phymatodes rufipes

== Species ==
These 59 species belong to the genus Phymatodes:

- Phymatodes abietinus Plavilstshikov & Lurie, 1960
- Phymatodes aeneus LeConte, 1854 (North America)
- Phymatodes aereus (Newman, 1838) (North America)
- Phymatodes ahenus (Holzschuh, 2007)
- Phymatodes albicinctus (Bates, 1873)
- Phymatodes alni (Linné, 1767)
- Phymatodes amoenus (Say, 1824) (North America)
- Phymatodes antonini (Rapuzzi, Sama & Tichy, 2011)
- Phymatodes ater LeConte, 1884 (North America)
- Phymatodes blandus (LeConte, 1859) (United States)
- Phymatodes concolor Linsley, 1934 (North America)
- Phymatodes decussatus (LeConte, 1857) (North America)
- Phymatodes dimidiatus (Kirby, 1837) (North America)
- Phymatodes ermolenkoi Tsherepanov, 1980
- Phymatodes eximius (Holzschuh, 1995)
- Phymatodes fasciatus (Villers, 1789)
- Phymatodes femoralis (Ménétriés, 1832) (Palearctic)
- Phymatodes fulgidus Hopping, 1928 (North America)
- Phymatodes glabratus (Charpentier, 1825)
- Phymatodes grandis Casey, 1912 (North America)
- Phymatodes gudenzii (Sama, 1987)
- Phymatodes hardyi (Van Dyke, 1928) (North America)
- Phymatodes hauseri (Pic, 1907)
- Phymatodes hirtellus (LeConte, 1873) (North America)
- Phymatodes huetheri Wappes & Santos-Silva, 2019
- Phymatodes infasciatus (Pic, 1935) (eastern Asia)
- Phymatodes infuscatus (LeConte, 1859) (United States)
- Phymatodes jiangi Z. Wang & Zheng, 2003 (South Korea and China)
- Phymatodes kasnaki (Sama, 2011)
- Phymatodes kozlovi Semenov & Plavilstshikov, 1936 (China)
- Phymatodes latefasciatus Yang, 2014
- Phymatodes lengi Joutel, 1911 (United States)
- Phymatodes lividus (Rossi, 1794)
- Phymatodes maaki (Kraatz, 1879)
- Phymatodes maculicollis LeConte, 1878 (North America)
- Phymatodes magnanii (Sama & Rapuzzi, 1999) (Turkey)
- Phymatodes mediofasciatus Pic, 1933
- Phymatodes mizunumai Hayashi, 1974
- Phymatodes murzini Danilevsky, 1993 (South Korea)
- Phymatodes nigerrimus Van Dyke, 1920 (United States)
- Phymatodes nigrescens Hardy & Preece, 1927 (North America)
- Phymatodes nitidus LeConte, 1874 (Hawaii, North America)
- Phymatodes obliquus Casey, 1891 (North America)
- Phymatodes puncticollis Mulsant, 1862
- Phymatodes pusillus (Fabricius, 1787)
- Phymatodes quadrimaculatus Gressitt, 1935
- Phymatodes rufipes (Fabricius, 1776) (Europe)
- Phymatodes savioi Pic, 1935
- Phymatodes semenovi Plavilstshikov, 1935 (China)
- Phymatodes shareeae Cope, 1984 (United States)
- Phymatodes sinensis (Pic, 1900) (China)
- Phymatodes testaceus (Linné, 1758)
- Phymatodes tysoni Chemsak & Linsley, 1984 (United States)
- Phymatodes vandae Danilevsky, 2010 (Greece)
- Phymatodes varius (Fabricius, 1776) (North America)
- Phymatodes vilitatis Linsley, 1940 (United States)
- Phymatodes vulneratus (LeConte, 1857) (North America)
- Phymatodes wrzecionkoi (Rapuzzi & Sama, 2010)
- Phymatodes zemlinae Plavilstshikov & Anufriev, 1964 (eastern Asia)
