= Semanotus ligneus =

Scientific classification
- Kingdom: Animalia
- Phylum: Arthropoda
- Class: Insecta
- Order: Coleoptera
- Suborder: Polyphaga
- Infraorder: Cucujiformia
- Family: Cerambycidae
- Genus: Semanotus
- Species: S. ligneus

Binomial name
- Semanotus ligneus (Fabricius, 1787)

Synonyms
- Semanotus nicolas White, 1855; Semanotus russicum Stephens, 1831; Semanotus lignea parvicollis (Casey, 1912)

Species of beetle

Semanotus ligneus is a species of beetle in the family Cerambycidae.
