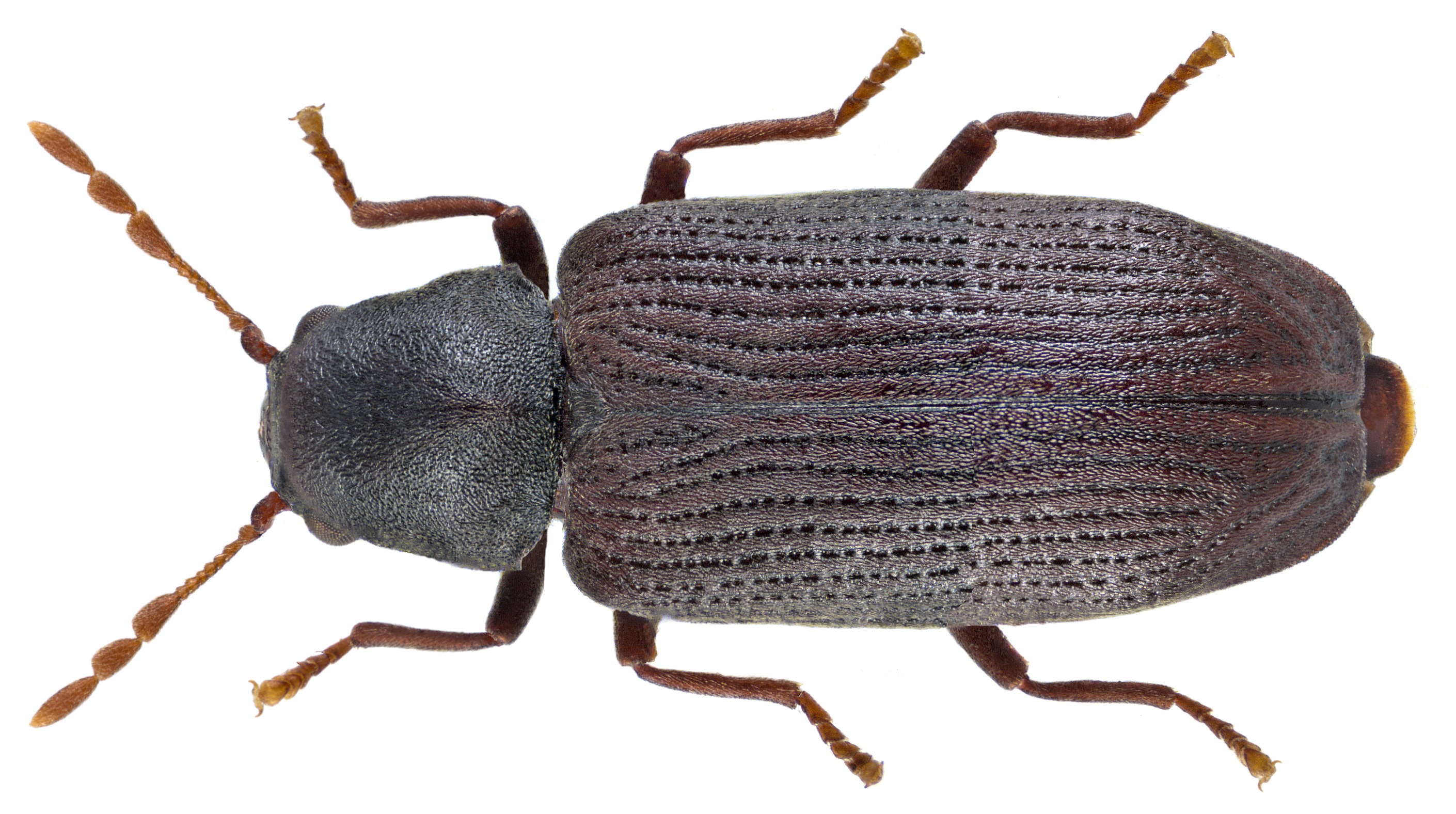

Scientific classification
- Kingdom: Animalia
- Phylum: Arthropoda
- Class: Insecta
- Order: Coleoptera
- Suborder: Polyphaga
- Family: Ptinidae
- Genus: Hemicoelus
- Species: H. fulvicornis

Binomial name
- Hemicoelus fulvicornis (Sturm 1837)

= Hemicoelus fulvicornis =

Species of beetle

Hemicoelus fulvicornis is a species of beetle in the family Ptinidae. It is native to Europe, its distribution extending into the Caucasus and Asia Minor.

Beetles in this family live and breed in wood. This species is associated with trees such as hornbeams, chestnuts, hazels, beeches, oaks, and species of Populus and Prunus.
