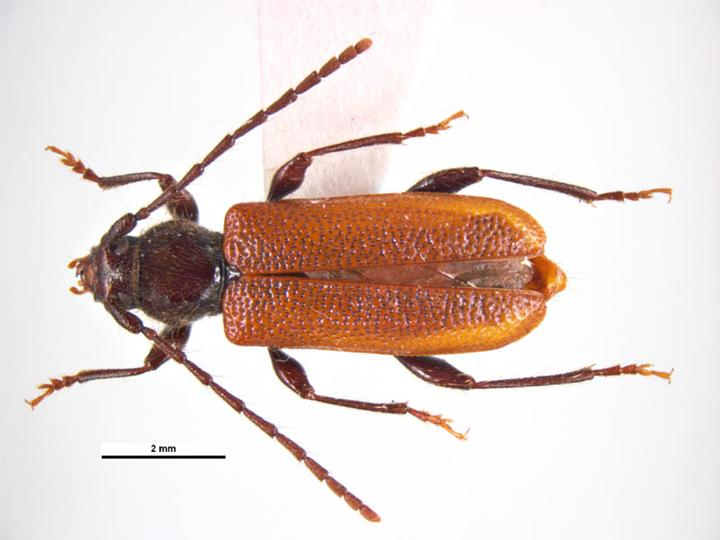
- Callidiellum rufipennis

Scientific classification
- Domain: Eukaryota
- Kingdom: Animalia
- Phylum: Arthropoda
- Class: Insecta
- Order: Coleoptera
- Suborder: Polyphaga
- Infraorder: Cucujiformia
- Family: Cerambycidae
- Subfamily: Cerambycinae
- Tribe: Callidiini
- Genus: Callidiellum; Linsley, 1940

= Callidiellum =

Genus of beetles

Callidiellum is a genus of beetles in the family Cerambycidae, containing the following species:

- Callidiellum cupressi (Van Dyke, 1923)
- Callidiellum rufipenne
- Callidiellum virescens Chemsak & Linsley, 1966
