= Semanotus australis =

Scientific classification
- Domain: Eukaryota
- Kingdom: Animalia
- Phylum: Arthropoda
- Class: Insecta
- Order: Coleoptera
- Suborder: Polyphaga
- Infraorder: Cucujiformia
- Family: Cerambycidae
- Genus: Semanotus
- Species: S. australis

Binomial name
- Semanotus australis Giesbert, 1993

Species of beetle

Semanotus australis is a species of beetle in the family Cerambycidae.
