= Pronocera collaris =

Scientific classification
- Domain: Eukaryota
- Kingdom: Animalia
- Phylum: Arthropoda
- Class: Insecta
- Order: Coleoptera
- Suborder: Polyphaga
- Infraorder: Cucujiformia
- Family: Cerambycidae
- Genus: Pronocera
- Species: P. collaris

Binomial name
- Pronocera collaris (Kirby in Richardson, 1837)

Species of beetle

Pronocera collaris is a species of long-horned beetle in the family Cerambycidae. It is found in North America.

== Subspecies ==
These two subspecies belong to the species Pronocera collaris:

- Pronocera collaris collaris (Kirby in Richardson, 1837)
- Pronocera collaris lecontei Chemsak, 1963
