= Hemicoelus carinatus =

Scientific classification
- Kingdom: Animalia
- Phylum: Arthropoda
- Class: Insecta
- Order: Coleoptera
- Suborder: Polyphaga
- Family: Ptinidae
- Genus: Hemicoelus
- Species: H. carinatus

Binomial name
- Hemicoelus carinatus (Say, 1823)

Synonyms
- Hemicoelus errans (Melsheimer, 1846); Hemicoelus linearis (LeConte, 1865)

Species of beetle

Hemicoelus carinatus is a species in the subfamily Anobiinae ("death-watch beetles"), in the order Coleoptera ("beetles"). The species is known generally as the "Eastern deathwatch beetle". It is found in North America.
