= Pronocera =

Scientific classification
- Kingdom: Animalia
- Phylum: Arthropoda
- Class: Insecta
- Order: Coleoptera
- Suborder: Polyphaga
- Infraorder: Cucujiformia
- Family: Cerambycidae
- Tribe: Callidiini
- Genus: Pronocera; Motschulsky, 1859

Synonyms
- Gonocallus LeConte, 1873; Protocallidium Csiki, 1904; Pseudophymatodes Pic, 1901

Genus of beetles

Pronocera is a genus of long-horned beetles in the family Cerambycidae. There are at least three described species in Pronocera.

== Species ==
These three species belong to the genus Pronocera:

- Pronocera angusta (Kriechbaumer, 1844)
- Pronocera collaris (Kirby in Richardson, 1837)
- Pronocera sibirica (Gebler, 1848)
