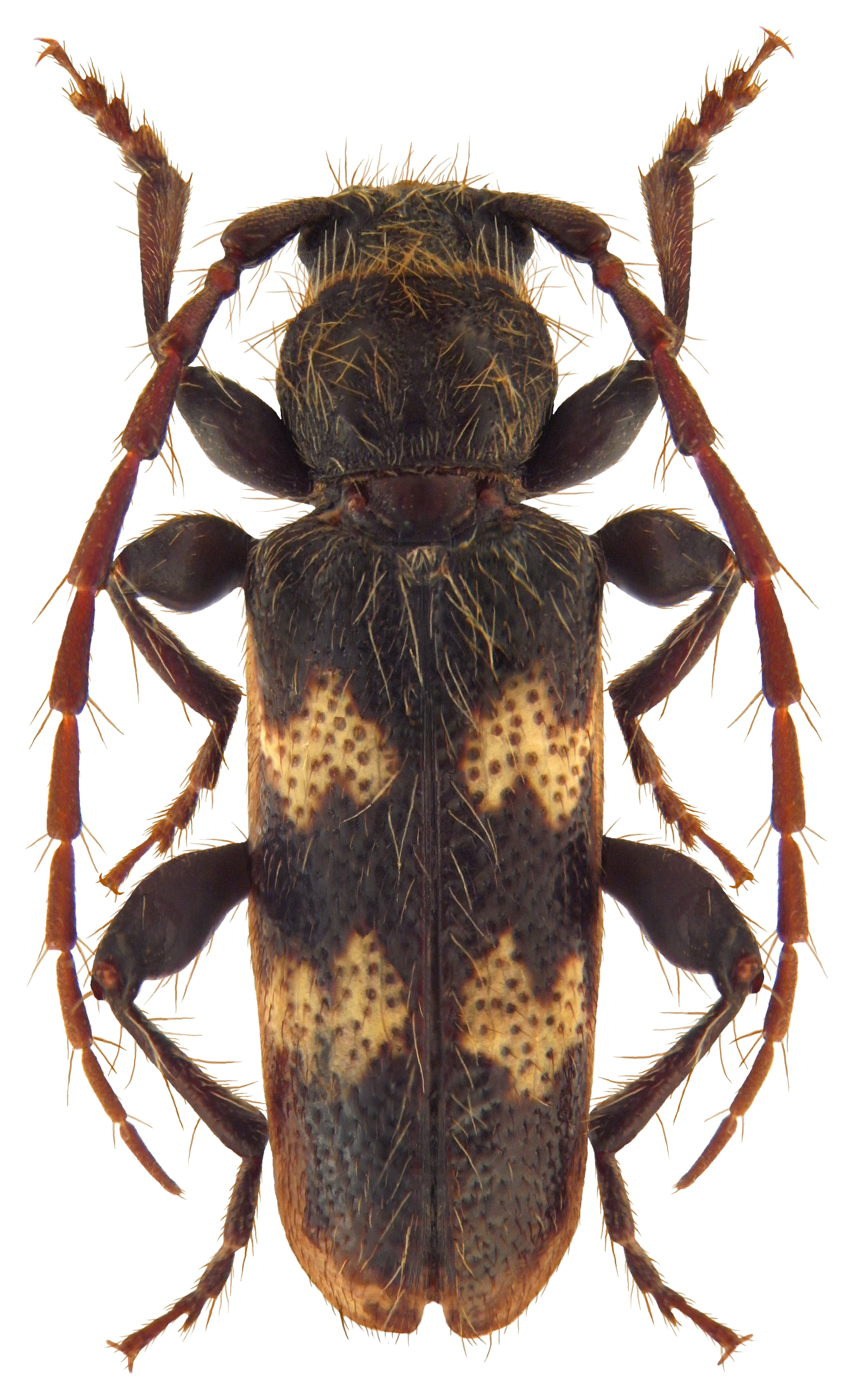
- Semanotus undatus

Scientific classification
- Domain: Eukaryota
- Kingdom: Animalia
- Phylum: Arthropoda
- Class: Insecta
- Order: Coleoptera
- Suborder: Polyphaga
- Infraorder: Cucujiformia
- Family: Cerambycidae
- Subfamily: Cerambycinae
- Tribe: Callidiini
- Genus: Semanotus; Mulsant, 1839

Synonyms
- Xenodorum Marseul 1856; Hylotrupes LeConte 1873; Anocomis Casey 1912; Anacomis Leng 1920; Hemicallidium Casey 1912; Sympiezocera Lucas 1851

= Semanotus =

Genus of beetles

Semanotus is a genus of beetles in the family Cerambycidae, first described by Étienne Mulsant in 1839.

== Species ==
Semanotus contains the following species:

- Semanotus algiricus Pic, 1905
- Semanotus amethystinus (LeConte, 1853)
- Semanotus amplus (Casey, 1912)
- Semanotus australis Giesbert, 1993
- Semanotus basalis (Casey, 1924)
- Semanotus bifasciatus (Motschulsky, 1875)
- Semanotus conformis Casey, 1924
- Semanotus japonicus Lacordaire, 1869
- Semanotus juniperi (Fisher, 1915)
- Semanotus laurasii (Croissandeau, 1890)
- Semanotus ligneus (Fabricius, 1787)
- Semanotus litigiosus (Casey, 1891)
- Semanotus nigroalbus Holzschuh, 1984
- Semanotus russicus (Fabricius, 1777)
- Semanotus semenovi Okunev, 1933
- Semanotus sinoauster Gressitt, 1951
- Semanotus terminatus Casey, 1912
- Semanotus undatus (Linnaeus, 1758)
- Semanotus yakushimensis Makihara, 2004
