= Hemicoelus defectus =

Scientific classification
- Kingdom: Animalia
- Phylum: Arthropoda
- Clade: Pancrustacea
- Class: Insecta
- Order: Coleoptera
- Suborder: Polyphaga
- Family: Ptinidae
- Genus: Hemicoelus
- Species: H. defectus

Binomial name
- Hemicoelus defectus (Fall, 1905)

Species of beetle

Hemicoelus defectus is a species of death-watch beetle in the family Ptinidae. It is found in North America.
