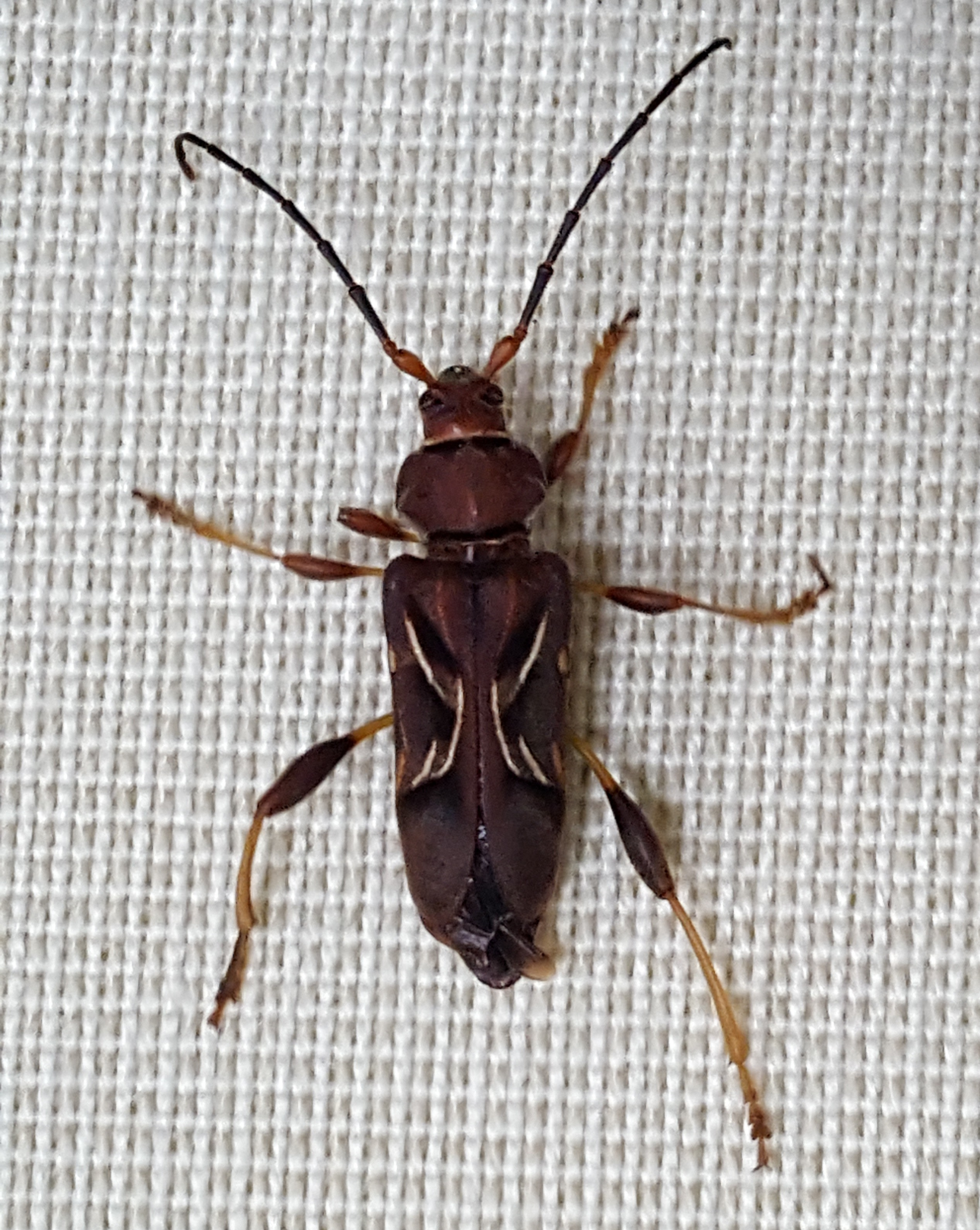

Scientific classification
- Domain: Eukaryota
- Kingdom: Animalia
- Phylum: Arthropoda
- Class: Insecta
- Order: Coleoptera
- Suborder: Polyphaga
- Infraorder: Cucujiformia
- Family: Cerambycidae
- Genus: Physocnemum
- Species: P. andreae

Binomial name
- Physocnemum andreae (Haldeman, 1847)

Synonyms
- Physocnemum luscus Thomson, 1861

= Physocnemum andreae =

Species of beetle

Physocnemum andreae is a species of beetle in the family Cerambycidae. Known as the cypress bark borer, this type of beetle is native to eastern North America and is classified as uncommon.
