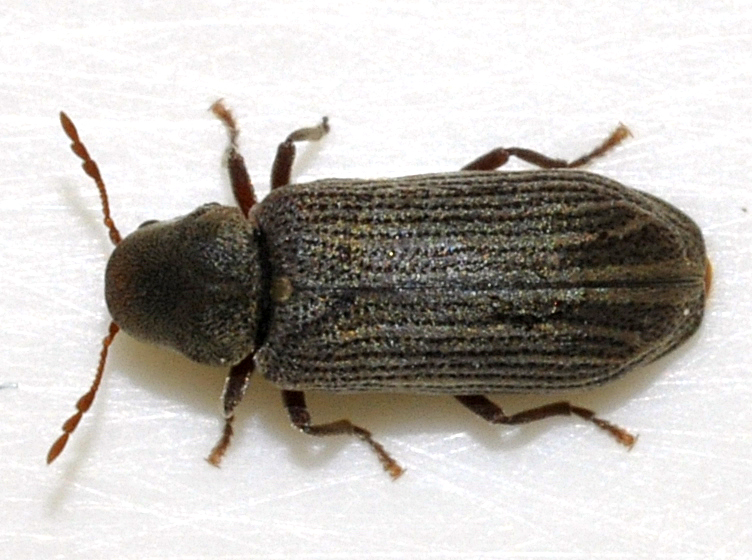

Scientific classification
- Kingdom: Animalia
- Phylum: Arthropoda
- Class: Insecta
- Order: Coleoptera
- Suborder: Polyphaga
- Family: Ptinidae
- Genus: Hemicoelus
- Species: H. costatus

Binomial name
- Hemicoelus costatus (Aragona, 1830)

= Hemicoelus costatus =

Species of beetle

Hemicoelus costatus is a species of beetles in the family Ptinidae, found primarily in Europe.
