= Pnigomenus =

Scientific classification
- Domain: Eukaryota
- Kingdom: Animalia
- Phylum: Arthropoda
- Class: Insecta
- Order: Coleoptera
- Suborder: Polyphaga
- Infraorder: Cucujiformia
- Family: Cerambycidae
- Tribe: Callidiini
- Genus: Pnigomenus; Bosq, 1951
- Species: P. kuscheli

Binomial name
- Pnigomenus kuscheli Bosq, 1951

Genus of beetles

Pnigomenus is a genus of longhorn beetle in the family Cerambycidae. This genus has a single species, Pnigomenus kuscheli, found in Chile.
