= Hemicoelus gibbicollis =

Scientific classification
- Kingdom: Animalia
- Phylum: Arthropoda
- Class: Insecta
- Order: Coleoptera
- Suborder: Polyphaga
- Family: Ptinidae
- Genus: Hemicoelus
- Species: H. gibbicollis

Binomial name
- Hemicoelus gibbicollis (LeConte, 1859)

Synonyms
- Hemicoelus destructor (Fisher, 1938); Hemicoelus roguensis (Hatch, 1961)

Species of beetle

Hemicoelus gibbicollis, known generally as California deathwatch beetle, is a species of death-watch beetle in the family Ptinidae. Other common names include the Pacific powder post beetle and western deathwatch beetle. It is found in North America.
