= Semanotus amethystinus =

Scientific classification
- Kingdom: Animalia
- Phylum: Arthropoda
- Class: Insecta
- Order: Coleoptera
- Suborder: Polyphaga
- Infraorder: Cucujiformia
- Family: Cerambycidae
- Genus: Semanotus
- Species: S. amethystinus

Binomial name
- Semanotus amethystinus (LeConte, 1853)

Species of beetle

Semanotus amethystinus is a species of beetle in the family Cerambycidae.
