= Callidiellum virescens =

Scientific classification
- Domain: Eukaryota
- Kingdom: Animalia
- Phylum: Arthropoda
- Class: Insecta
- Order: Coleoptera
- Suborder: Polyphaga
- Infraorder: Cucujiformia
- Family: Cerambycidae
- Genus: Callidiellum
- Species: C. virescens

Binomial name
- Callidiellum virescens Chemsak & Linsley, 1966

Species of beetle

Callidiellum virescens is a species of beetle in the family Cerambycidae. It was described by Chemsak & Linsley in 1966.
