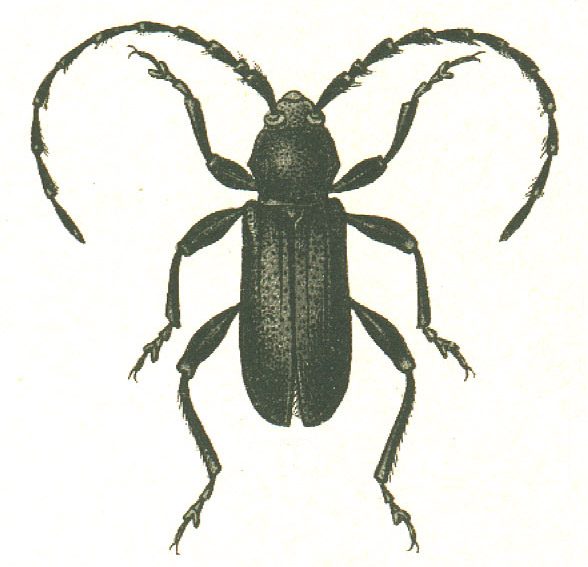
- Ropalopus clavipes

Scientific classification
- Domain: Eukaryota
- Kingdom: Animalia
- Phylum: Arthropoda
- Class: Insecta
- Order: Coleoptera
- Suborder: Polyphaga
- Infraorder: Cucujiformia
- Family: Cerambycidae
- Tribe: Callidiini
- Genus: Ropalopus; Mulsant, 1839

Synonyms
- Euryoptera Horn, 1860

= Ropalopus =

Genus of beetle

Ropalopus is a genus of long-horned beetles in the family Cerambycidae. There are about 20 species of Ropalopus found in Eurasia, and a single species, Ropalopus sanguinicollis, found in the northeastern United States and southern Canada.

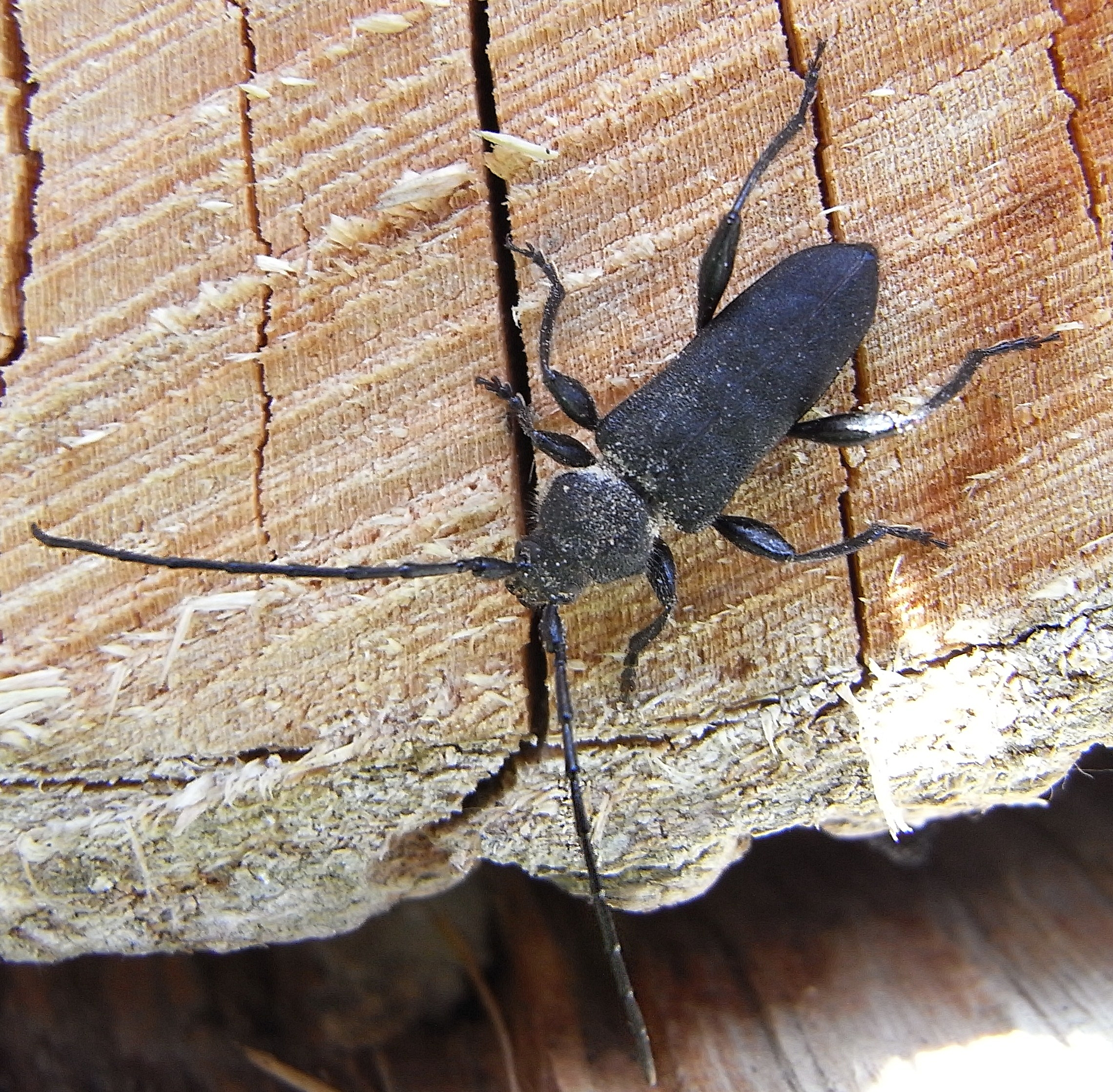
Ropalopus macropus

== Species ==
These 21 species belong to the genus Ropalopus:

- Ropalopus aurantiicollis Plavilstshikov, 1940^{c g}
- Ropalopus clavipes (Fabricius, 1775)^{c g}
- Ropalopus eleonorae Sama & Rapuzzi, 2002^{c g}
- Ropalopus femoratus (Linné, 1758)^{c g}
- Ropalopus hanae Sama & Rejzek, 2002^{c g}
- Ropalopus insubricus (Germar, 1824)^{c g}
- Ropalopus ledereri Fairmaire, 1866^{c g}
- Ropalopus lederi Ganglbauer, 1882^{c g}
- Ropalopus macropus (Germar, 1824)^{c g}
- Ropalopus mali Holzschuh, 1993^{c g}
- Ropalopus nadari Pic, 1894^{c g}
- Ropalopus nataliyae Danilevsky & Skrylnik, 2014^{c g}
- Ropalopus ruber Gressitt, 1939^{c g}
- Ropalopus ruficollis Matsumura, 1911^{c g}
- Ropalopus sanguinicollis (Horn, 1860)^{i c g b}
- Ropalopus sculpturatus Pic, 1931^{c g}
- Ropalopus siculus (Stierlin, 1864)^{c g}
- Ropalopus signaticollis Solsky, 1872^{c g}
- Ropalopus speciosus Plavilstshikov, 1915^{c g}
- Ropalopus ungaricus (Herbst, 1784)^{c g}
- Ropalopus varini (Bedel, 1870)^{c g}

Data sources: i = ITIS, c = Catalogue of Life, g = GBIF, b = Bugguide.net
