= Physocnemum violaceipenne =

Scientific classification
- Domain: Eukaryota
- Kingdom: Animalia
- Phylum: Arthropoda
- Class: Insecta
- Order: Coleoptera
- Suborder: Polyphaga
- Infraorder: Cucujiformia
- Family: Cerambycidae
- Genus: Physocnemum
- Species: P. violaceipenne

Binomial name
- Physocnemum violaceipenne Hamilton, 1896

Species of beetle

Physocnemum violaceipenne is a species of beetle in the family Cerambycidae.
