= Thrichocalydon =

Scientific classification
- Domain: Eukaryota
- Kingdom: Animalia
- Phylum: Arthropoda
- Class: Insecta
- Order: Coleoptera
- Suborder: Polyphaga
- Infraorder: Cucujiformia
- Family: Cerambycidae
- Tribe: Callidiini
- Genus: Thrichocalydon; Bosq, 1951
- Species: T. havrylenkoi

Binomial name
- Thrichocalydon havrylenkoi (Bosq, 1951)

Synonyms
- Trichocalydon

Genus of beetles

Thrichocalydon is a genus of longhorn beetles in the family Cerambycidae. This genus has a single species, Thrichocalydon havrylenkoi, found in Argentina and Chile.
