= Semanotus litigiosus =

Scientific classification
- Kingdom: Animalia
- Phylum: Arthropoda
- Class: Insecta
- Order: Coleoptera
- Suborder: Polyphaga
- Infraorder: Cucujiformia
- Family: Cerambycidae
- Genus: Semanotus
- Species: S. litigiosus

Binomial name
- Semanotus litigiosus (Casey, 1891)

Species of beetle

Semanotus litigiosus is a species of beetle in the family Cerambycidae.
