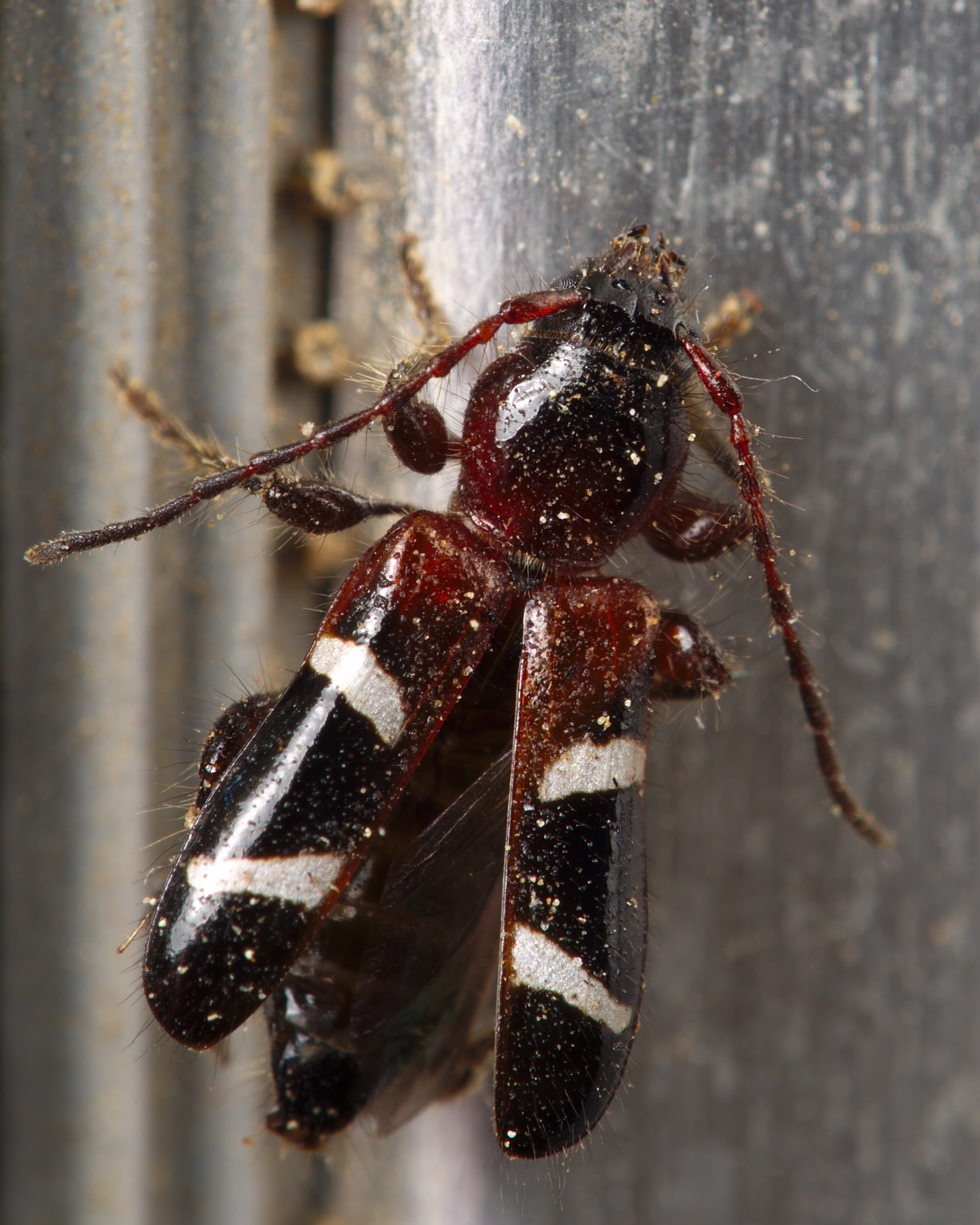

Scientific classification
- Kingdom: Animalia
- Phylum: Arthropoda
- Class: Insecta
- Order: Coleoptera
- Suborder: Polyphaga
- Infraorder: Cucujiformia
- Family: Cerambycidae
- Genus: Phymatodes
- Species: P. nitidus

Binomial name
- Phymatodes nitidus LeConte, 1874

= Phymatodes nitidus =

Species of beetle

Phymatodes nitidus is a species of longhorn beetle. It occurs in the west coast of North America, from southern California to British Columbia.

Phymatodes nitidus lays its eggs on the surface of giant sequoia and coast redwood cones, into which the larvae then burrow.
