= Elatotrypes =

Elatotrypes hoferi

Scientific classification
- Kingdom: Animalia
- Phylum: Arthropoda
- Class: Insecta
- Order: Coleoptera
- Suborder: Polyphaga
- Infraorder: Cucujiformia
- Family: Cerambycidae
- Genus: Elatotrypes
- Species: E. hoferi

Binomial name
- Elatotrypes hoferi Fisher, 1919

Genus of beetles

Elatotrypes hoferi is a species of beetle in the family Cerambycidae, the only species in the genus Elatotrypes.
