= Meriellum =

Meriellum proteus

Scientific classification
- Kingdom: Animalia
- Phylum: Arthropoda
- Class: Insecta
- Order: Coleoptera
- Suborder: Polyphaga
- Infraorder: Cucujiformia
- Family: Cerambycidae
- Genus: Meriellum
- Species: M. proteus

Binomial name
- Meriellum proteus (Kirby in Richardson, 1837)

Genus of beetles

Meriellum proteus is a species of beetle in the family Cerambycidae, the only species in the genus Meriellum.
