= Hemicoelus canaliculatus =

Scientific classification
- Kingdom: Animalia
- Phylum: Arthropoda
- Class: Insecta
- Order: Coleoptera
- Suborder: Polyphaga
- Family: Ptinidae
- Genus: Hemicoelus
- Species: H. canaliculatus

Binomial name
- Hemicoelus canaliculatus (Thomson, 1863)

Species of beetle

Hemicoelus canaliculatus is a species of death-watch beetle in the family Ptinidae.
