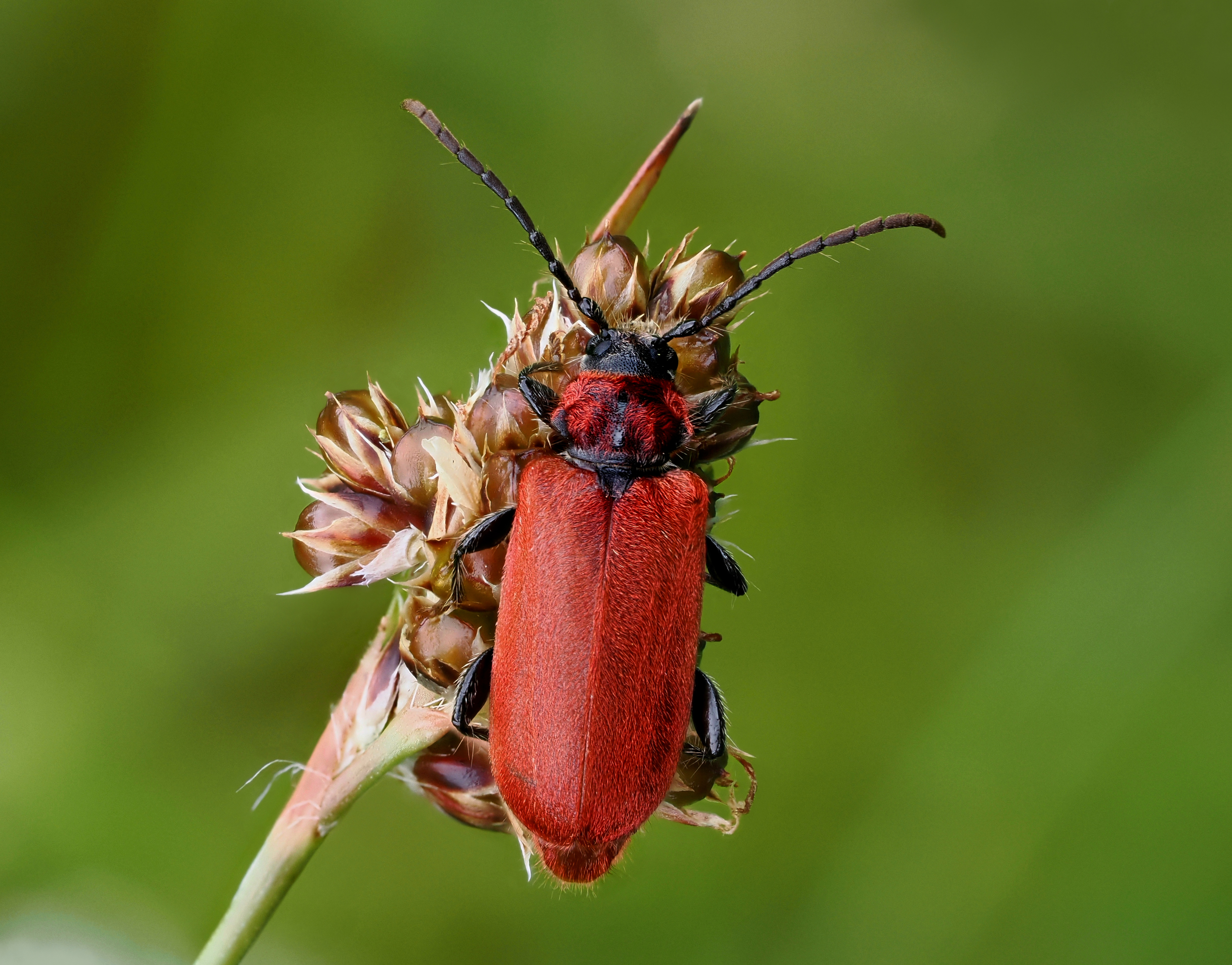

Scientific classification
- Kingdom: Animalia
- Phylum: Arthropoda
- Clade: Pancrustacea
- Class: Insecta
- Order: Coleoptera
- Suborder: Polyphaga
- Infraorder: Cucujiformia
- Family: Cerambycidae
- Subfamily: Cerambycinae
- Genus: Pyrrhidium; Fairmaire, 1864
- Species: P. sanguineum

Binomial name
- Pyrrhidium sanguineum Linnaeus, 1758

= Pyrrhidium =

Genus of beetles

Pyrrhidium sanguineum is a longhorn beetle common in much of Europe. Its preferred food tree is oak. It is the only species in the genus Pyrrhidium.
