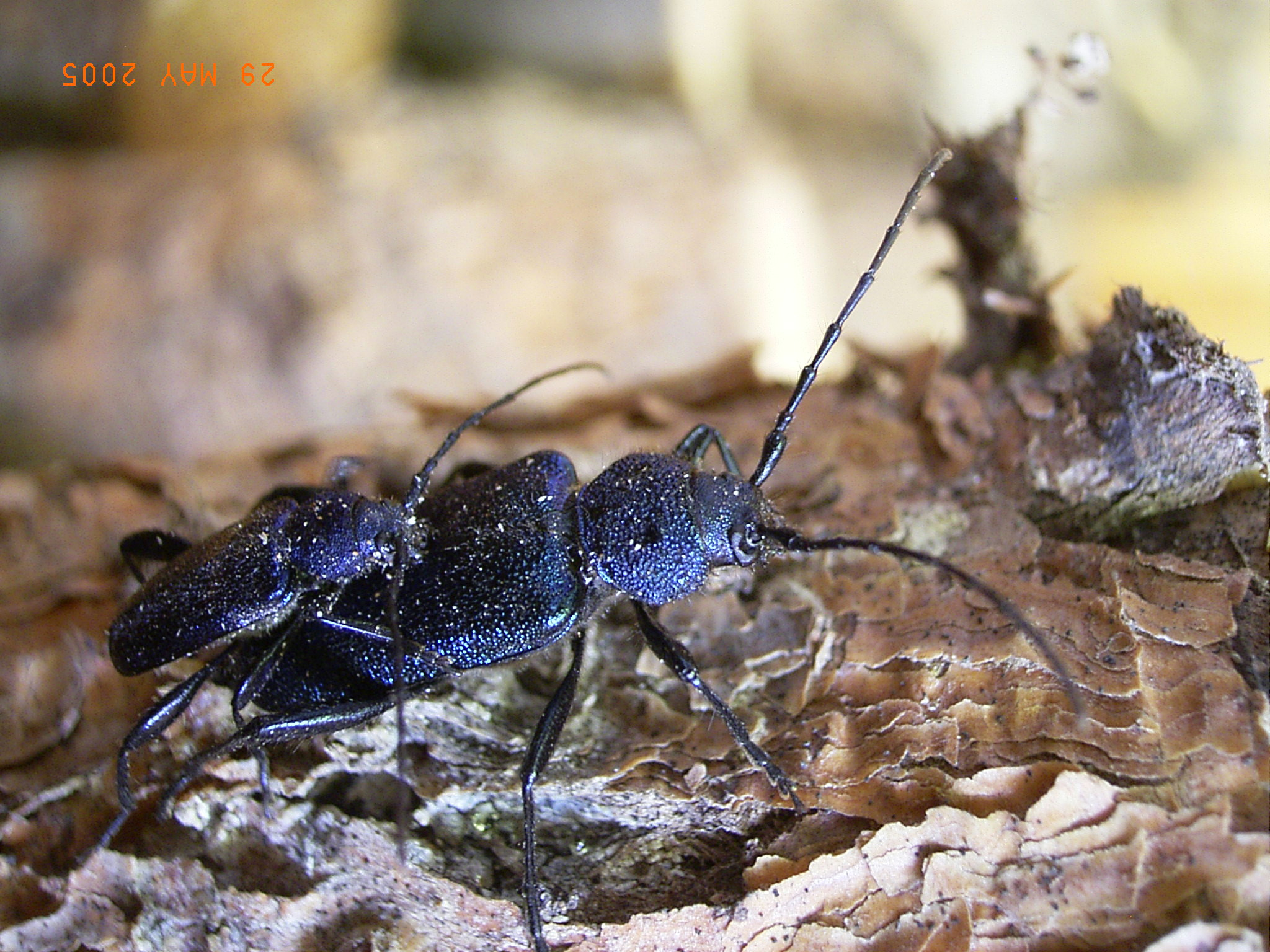
- Callidium violaceum

Scientific classification
- Domain: Eukaryota
- Kingdom: Animalia
- Phylum: Arthropoda
- Class: Insecta
- Order: Coleoptera
- Suborder: Polyphaga
- Infraorder: Cucujiformia
- Family: Cerambycidae
- Subfamily: Cerambycinae
- Tribe: Callidiini

= Callidiini =

Tribe of beetles

Callidiini is a tribe of longhorn beetles in the family Cerambycidae. There are more than 30 genera and 180 described species in Callidiini.

== Genera ==
These 31 genera belong to the tribe Callidiini:

- Agada Fairmaire, 1892
- Callidiellum Linsley, 1940
- Callidium Fabricius, 1775
- Calydon Thomson, 1864
- Delagrangeus Pic, 1892
- Dolomius Fairmaire, 1903
- Dundaia Holzschuh, 1993
- Ebogoanus Adlbauer, 2021
- Elatotrypes Fisher, 1919
- Gerdberndia Holzschuh, 1982
- Idiocalla Jordan, 1903
- Leioderes Redtenbacher, 1845
- Lioderina Ganglbauer, 1886
- Meriellum Linsley, 1957
- Oupyrrhidium Pic, 1900
- Paraxylocrius Niisato, 2009
- Phymatodes Mulsant, 1839
- Physocnemum Haldeman, 1847
- Pnigomenus Bosq, 1951
- Prionopsis Fairmaire, 1886
- Pronocera Motschulsky, 1859
- Prosemanotus Pic, 1933
- Pyrrhidium Fairmaire, 1868
- Rejzekius Adlbauer, 2008
- Ropalopus Mulsant, 1839
- Rutjana Danilevsky, 2020
- Semanotus Mulsant, 1839
- Teorotrium Fairmaire, 1901
- Thrichocalydon Bosq, 1951
- Turanium Baeckmann, 1922
- Xylocrius LeConte, 1873
