= Vrilletta expansa =

Scientific classification
- Kingdom: Animalia
- Phylum: Arthropoda
- Class: Insecta
- Order: Coleoptera
- Suborder: Polyphaga
- Superfamily: Bostrichoidea
- Family: Ptinidae
- Subfamily: Xyletininae
- Tribe: Xyletinini
- Genus: Vrilletta
- Species: V. expansa

Binomial name
- Vrilletta expansa LeConte, 1874

Species of beetle

Vrilletta expansa is a species of beetle in the family Ptinidae.
