= Euvrilletta arizonica =

Scientific classification
- Kingdom: Animalia
- Phylum: Arthropoda
- Clade: Pancrustacea
- Class: Insecta
- Order: Coleoptera
- Suborder: Polyphaga
- Superfamily: Bostrichoidea
- Family: Ptinidae
- Subfamily: Xyletininae
- Tribe: Xyletinini
- Genus: Euvrilletta
- Species: E. arizonica

Binomial name
- Euvrilletta arizonica White, 1976

Species of beetle

Euvrilletta arizonica is a species of beetle in the family Ptinidae.
