= Holcobius haleakalae =

Scientific classification
- Kingdom: Animalia
- Phylum: Arthropoda
- Clade: Pancrustacea
- Class: Insecta
- Order: Coleoptera
- Suborder: Polyphaga
- Infraorder: Bostrichiformia
- Superfamily: Bostrichoidea
- Family: Ptinidae
- Subfamily: Xyletininae
- Genus: Holcobius
- Species: H. haleakalae

Binomial name
- Holcobius haleakalae Perkins, 1910

Species of beetle

Holcobius haleakalae is a species of beetle in the family Ptinidae.

== Subspecies ==
These two subspecies belong to the species Holcobius haleakalae:

- Holcobius haleakalae chrysodytus Perkins, 1910
- Holcobius haleakalae haleakalae Perkins, 1910
