= Vrilletta convexa =

Scientific classification
- Kingdom: Animalia
- Phylum: Arthropoda
- Class: Insecta
- Order: Coleoptera
- Suborder: Polyphaga
- Superfamily: Bostrichoidea
- Family: Ptinidae
- Subfamily: Xyletininae
- Tribe: Xyletinini
- Genus: Vrilletta
- Species: V. convexa

Binomial name
- Vrilletta convexa LeConte, 1874

Species of beetle

Vrilletta convexa is a species of beetle in the family Ptinidae.
