= Euvrilletta serricornis =

Scientific classification
- Kingdom: Animalia
- Phylum: Arthropoda
- Clade: Pancrustacea
- Class: Insecta
- Order: Coleoptera
- Suborder: Polyphaga
- Superfamily: Bostrichoidea
- Family: Ptinidae
- Subfamily: Xyletininae
- Tribe: Xyletinini
- Genus: Euvrilletta
- Species: E. serricornis

Binomial name
- Euvrilletta serricornis White, 1973

Species of beetle

Euvrilletta serricornis is a species of beetle in the family Ptinidae.
