= Xyletobius blackburni =

Scientific classification
- Kingdom: Animalia
- Phylum: Arthropoda
- Clade: Pancrustacea
- Class: Insecta
- Order: Coleoptera
- Suborder: Polyphaga
- Superfamily: Bostrichoidea
- Family: Ptinidae
- Subfamily: Xyletininae
- Genus: Xyletobius
- Species: X. blackburni

Binomial name
- Xyletobius blackburni Perkins, 1910

Species of beetle

Xyletobius blackburni is a species of beetle in the family Ptinidae.

== Subspecies ==
These four subspecies belong to the species Xyletobius blackburni:

- Xyletobius blackburni blackburni Perkins, 1910
- Xyletobius blackburni scutellaris Perkins, 1910
- Xyletobius blackburni simplex Perkins, 1910
- Xyletobius blackburni suturalis Perkins, 1910
