= Holcobius pikoensis =

Scientific classification
- Kingdom: Animalia
- Phylum: Arthropoda
- Clade: Pancrustacea
- Class: Insecta
- Order: Coleoptera
- Suborder: Polyphaga
- Superfamily: Bostrichoidea
- Family: Ptinidae
- Subfamily: Xyletininae
- Genus: Holcobius
- Species: H. pikoensis

Binomial name
- Holcobius pikoensis Perkins, 1935

Species of beetle

Holcobius pikoensis is a species of beetle in the family Ptinidae.
