= Xyletobius lineatus =

Scientific classification
- Kingdom: Animalia
- Phylum: Arthropoda
- Clade: Pancrustacea
- Class: Insecta
- Order: Coleoptera
- Suborder: Polyphaga
- Superfamily: Bostrichoidea
- Family: Ptinidae
- Subfamily: Xyletininae
- Genus: Xyletobius
- Species: X. lineatus

Binomial name
- Xyletobius lineatus Sharp, 1885

Species of beetle

Xyletobius lineatus is a species of beetle in the family Ptinidae.

== Subspecies ==
These four subspecies belong to the species Xyletobius lineatus:

- Xyletobius lineatus apicalis Perkins, 1910
- Xyletobius lineatus holomelas Perkins, 1910
- Xyletobius lineatus humeralis Perkins, 1910
- Xyletobius lineatus lineatus Sharp, 1885
