= Neoxyletobius kirkaldyi =

Scientific classification
- Kingdom: Animalia
- Phylum: Arthropoda
- Class: Insecta
- Order: Coleoptera
- Suborder: Polyphaga
- Infraorder: Bostrichiformia
- Superfamily: Bostrichoidea
- Family: Ptinidae
- Genus: Neoxyletobius
- Species: N. kirkaldyi

Binomial name
- Neoxyletobius kirkaldyi (Perkins, 1910)

Species of beetle

Neoxyletobius kirkaldyi is a species of beetle in the family Ptinidae.
