= Holcobius glabricollis =

Scientific classification
- Kingdom: Animalia
- Phylum: Arthropoda
- Clade: Pancrustacea
- Class: Insecta
- Order: Coleoptera
- Suborder: Polyphaga
- Superfamily: Bostrichoidea
- Family: Ptinidae
- Subfamily: Xyletininae
- Genus: Holcobius
- Species: H. glabricollis

Binomial name
- Holcobius glabricollis Sharp, 1881

Species of beetle

Holcobius glabricollis is a species of beetle in the family Ptinidae.
