= Xyletobius sykesii =

Scientific classification
- Kingdom: Animalia
- Phylum: Arthropoda
- Clade: Pancrustacea
- Class: Insecta
- Order: Coleoptera
- Suborder: Polyphaga
- Superfamily: Bostrichoidea
- Family: Ptinidae
- Subfamily: Xyletininae
- Genus: Xyletobius
- Species: X. sykesii

Binomial name
- Xyletobius sykesii Perkins, 1910

Species of beetle

Xyletobius sykesii is a species of beetle in the family Ptinidae.

== Subspecies ==
These two subspecies belong to the species Xyletobius sykesii:

- Xyletobius sykesii molokaiensis Perkins, 1910
- Xyletobius sykesii sykesii Perkins, 1910
