= Xyletobius proteus =

Scientific classification
- Kingdom: Animalia
- Phylum: Arthropoda
- Clade: Pancrustacea
- Class: Insecta
- Order: Coleoptera
- Suborder: Polyphaga
- Superfamily: Bostrichoidea
- Family: Ptinidae
- Subfamily: Xyletininae
- Genus: Xyletobius
- Species: X. proteus

Binomial name
- Xyletobius proteus Perkins, 1910

Species of beetle

Xyletobius proteus is a species of beetle in the family Ptinidae.

== Subspecies ==
These six subspecies belong to the species Xyletobius proteus:

- Xyletobius proteus apicalis Perkins, 1910
- Xyletobius proteus dorsalis Perkins, 1910
- Xyletobius proteus hastatus Perkins, 1910
- Xyletobius proteus maurus Perkins, 1910
- Xyletobius proteus proteus Perkins, 1910
- Xyletobius proteus simplex Perkins, 1910
