= Xyletobius hawaiiensis =

Scientific classification
- Kingdom: Animalia
- Phylum: Arthropoda
- Clade: Pancrustacea
- Class: Insecta
- Order: Coleoptera
- Suborder: Polyphaga
- Superfamily: Bostrichoidea
- Family: Ptinidae
- Subfamily: Xyletininae
- Genus: Xyletobius
- Species: X. hawaiiensis

Binomial name
- Xyletobius hawaiiensis Perkins, 1910

Species of beetle

Xyletobius hawaiiensis is a species of beetle in the family Ptinidae.
