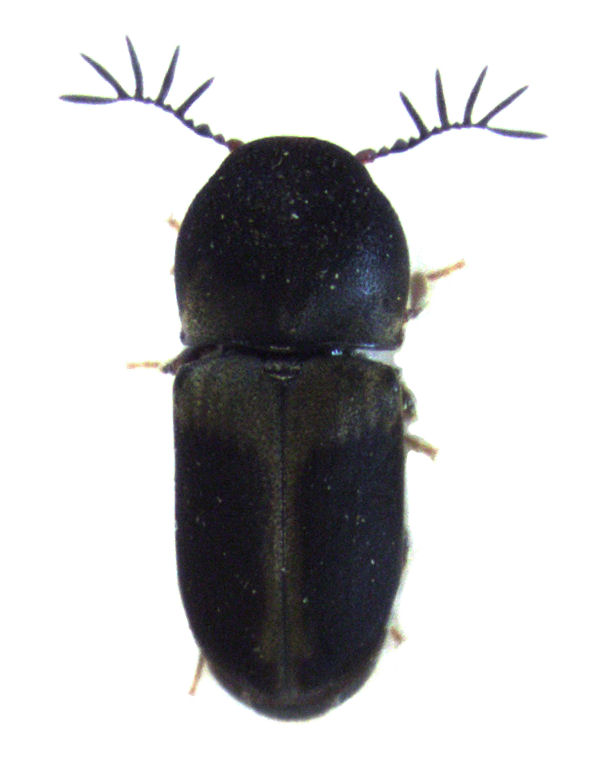
- D. granicollis

Scientific classification
- Domain: Eukaryota
- Kingdom: Animalia
- Phylum: Arthropoda
- Class: Insecta
- Order: Coleoptera
- Suborder: Polyphaga
- Infraorder: Bostrichiformia
- Superfamily: Bostrichoidea
- Family: Ptinidae
- Subfamily: Xyletininae
- Genus: Deroptilinus; Lea, 1924

Synonyms
- Flabellomesothes Pic, 1936 Doroptilinus Español, 1968

= Deroptilinus =

Genus of ptinid beetles

Deroptilinus is a genus of beetles in the family Ptinidae and subfamily Xyletininae. It occurs in Asia, Australia and New Zealand.

== Description ==
According to the original description of the genus, the head is concealed from above by the prothorax. The eyes are small and round. Inserted in front of the eyes are the antennae, which have the basal segment large, the 2nd to 4th and 6th and 8th triangular, the 11th elongate, and the other segments each with a long ramus. The prothorax is finely margined throughout and has granules anteriorly. The scutellum is moderately large. The elytra are slightly narrowed posteriorly so they do not cover the abdomen completely.

The prosternum is reduced anteriorly and has concealed cavities to receive the antennae. The mesosternum is concealed except for a very short intercoxal process. The metasternum is elongate with wide episterna. The abdomen has five distinct segments with the basal segment deeply grooved on each side to receive the hind legs.

All legs can be received in depressions. The femora of the legs are grooved to receive the tibiae. The tarsi have the four basal segments short and produced ventrally, while the fifth is about as long as the two preceding segments combined.

== Species ==
Deroptilinus is a small genus consisting of the following species:

- Deroptilinus alcobei Español, 1974
- Deroptilinus granicollis Lea, 1924
- Deroptilinus obscurus Sakai, 1975
