= Xyletobius fraternus =

Scientific classification
- Kingdom: Animalia
- Phylum: Arthropoda
- Clade: Pancrustacea
- Class: Insecta
- Order: Coleoptera
- Suborder: Polyphaga
- Superfamily: Bostrichoidea
- Family: Ptinidae
- Subfamily: Xyletininae
- Genus: Xyletobius
- Species: X. fraternus

Binomial name
- Xyletobius fraternus Perkins, 1910

Species of beetle

Xyletobius fraternus is a species of beetle in the family Ptinidae.

== Subspecies ==
These two subspecies belong to the species Xyletobius fraternus:

- Xyletobius fraternus fraternus Perkins, 1910
- Xyletobius fraternus laetior Perkins, 1910
