= Xyletobius affinis =

Scientific classification
- Kingdom: Animalia
- Phylum: Arthropoda
- Clade: Pancrustacea
- Class: Insecta
- Order: Coleoptera
- Suborder: Polyphaga
- Superfamily: Bostrichoidea
- Family: Ptinidae
- Subfamily: Xyletininae
- Genus: Xyletobius
- Species: X. affinis

Binomial name
- Xyletobius affinis Sharp, 1885

Species of beetle

Xyletobius affinis is a species of beetle in the family Ptinidae. It was first described by Sharp in 1885. The species is native to Oceania
