= X. silvestrii =

X. silvestrii may refer to:

- Xyletobius silvestrii, a beetle species
- Xysticus silvestrii, Simon, 1905, a crab spider species in the genus Xysticus found in Argentina

== See also ==
- Silvestrii (disambiguation)
