= Xyletomerus histricus =

Scientific classification
- Kingdom: Animalia
- Phylum: Arthropoda
- Clade: Pancrustacea
- Class: Insecta
- Order: Coleoptera
- Suborder: Polyphaga
- Family: Ptinidae
- Tribe: Xyletinini
- Genus: Xyletomerus
- Species: X. histricus

Binomial name
- Xyletomerus histricus Fall, 1905

Species of beetle

Xyletomerus histricus is a species of beetle in the family Ptinidae. It is found in North America.
