= V. californica =

V. californica may refer to:

- Vauquelinia californica, the Arizona rosewood, a plant species found in the southwestern portion of the US, in Baja California and Baja California Sur
- Verbena californica, the California vervain or Red Hills vervain, a plant species endemic to California
- Vitis californica, the California wild grape, a wild grape species native to most of California and southwestern Oregon
- Vrilletta californica, a beetle species

== See also ==
- List of Latin and Greek words commonly used in systematic names#C
