= Xyletinus pubescens =

Scientific classification
- Kingdom: Animalia
- Phylum: Arthropoda
- Clade: Pancrustacea
- Class: Insecta
- Order: Coleoptera
- Suborder: Polyphaga
- Family: Ptinidae
- Tribe: Xyletinini
- Genus: Xyletinus
- Species: X. pubescens

Binomial name
- Xyletinus pubescens LeConte, 1878

Species of beetle

Xyletinus pubescens is a species of beetle in the family Ptinidae. It is found in North America.
