= Xyletinus fasciatus =

Scientific classification
- Kingdom: Animalia
- Phylum: Arthropoda
- Clade: Pancrustacea
- Class: Insecta
- Order: Coleoptera
- Suborder: Polyphaga
- Family: Ptinidae
- Tribe: Xyletinini
- Genus: Xyletinus
- Species: X. fasciatus

Binomial name
- Xyletinus fasciatus White, 1962

Species of beetle

Xyletinus fasciatus is a species of beetle in the family Ptinidae. It is found in North America.
