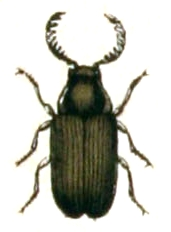
- X. pectinatus

Scientific classification
- Kingdom: Animalia
- Phylum: Arthropoda
- Class: Insecta
- Order: Coleoptera
- Suborder: Polyphaga
- Superfamily: Bostrichoidea
- Family: Ptinidae
- Subfamily: Xyletininae
- Tribe: Xyletinini
- Genus: Xyletinus; Latreille, 1809

Subgenera
- Calypterus; Pseudocalypterus; Xeronthobius; Xyletinus; Xyletomimus

Synonyms
- Xylotinus Sturm, 1826 (Missp.); Xiletinus Stephens, 1829 (Missp.); Xytelinus Griffith & Pidgeon, 1832 (Missp.); Calypterus Mulsant & Godart, 1859; Notiomimus Wollaston, 1861; Xeronthobius Morawitz, 1863; Sternoplus Mulsant & Rey, 1864; Xyletomimus Reitter, 1902; Ryletinus Zaitsev, 1956 (Missp.); Xylentinus Santoro, 1957 (Missp.)

= Xyletinus =

Genus of beetles

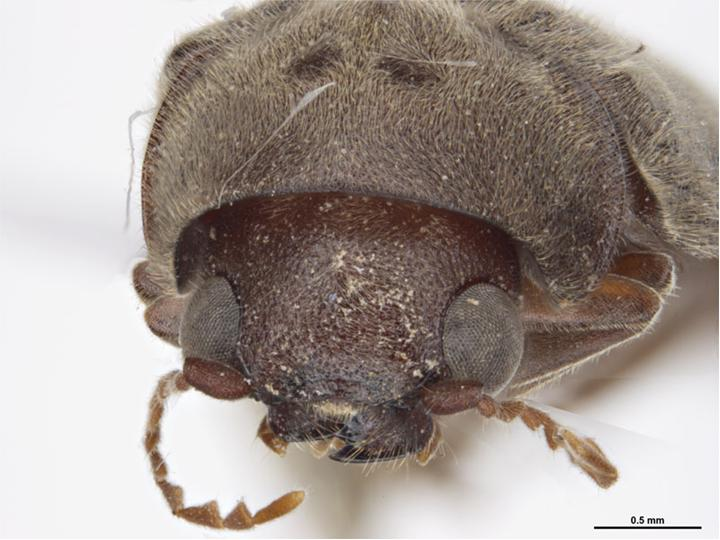
Xyletinus sp.

Xyletinus is a genus of death-watch and spider beetles in the family Ptinidae and subfamily Xyletininae.

== Species ==
These 51 species belong to the genus Xyletinus:

- Xyletinus ater
- Xyletinus balcanicus Gottwald, 1977^{g}
- Xyletinus bicolor White, 1977^{i c g}
- Xyletinus brevis (White, 1960)^{i c g}
- Xyletinus bucephaloides Reitter, 1901^{g}
- Xyletinus bucephalus (Illiger, 1807)^{g}
- Xyletinus californicus White, 1977^{i c g}
- Xyletinus carinatus White, 1977^{i c g}
- Xyletinus confusus White, 1977^{i c g}
- Xyletinus cylindricus Kofler, 1970^{g}
- Xyletinus distinguendus Kofler, 1970^{g}
- Xyletinus excellens Kofler, 1970^{g}
- Xyletinus fasciatus White, 1962^{i c g b}
- Xyletinus fibyensis Lundblad, 1949^{g}
- Xyletinus fimicola (Wollaston, 1861)^{g}
- Xyletinus formosus Mannerheim, 1849^{g}
- Xyletinus fucatus LeConte, 1865^{i c g}
- Xyletinus gracilipes Fall, 1905^{i c g}
- Xyletinus hanseni Jansson, 1947^{g}
- Xyletinus interpositus Gottwald, 1977^{g}
- Xyletinus kofleri Gottwald, 1977^{g}
- Xyletinus laticollis (Duftschmid, 1825)^{g}
- Xyletinus latiusculus Kofler, 1970^{g}
- Xyletinus lecerfi Kocher, 1956^{g}
- Xyletinus leprieuri Chobaut, 1894^{g}
- Xyletinus longitarsis Jansson, 1942^{g}
- Xyletinus lugubris LeConte, 1878^{i c g b}
- Xyletinus maculatus Kiesenwetter, 1877^{g}
- Xyletinus marmoratus Pic, 1911^{g}
- Xyletinus moraviensis Gottwald, 1977^{g}
- Xyletinus muehlei Gottwald, 1983^{g}
- Xyletinus obsoletus White, 1973^{i c g}
- Xyletinus ocularis Reitter, 1901^{g}
- Xyletinus ornatus
- Xyletinus pallens Germar, 1824^{g}
- Xyletinus parvus White, 1977^{i c g}
- Xyletinus pectinatus
- Xyletinus pectiniferus Fairmaire, 1879^{g}
- Xyletinus planicollis Lohse, 1957^{g}
- Xyletinus pseudoblongulus Gottwald, 1977^{g}
- Xyletinus puberulus (Boheman, 1858)^{i c g}
- Xyletinus pubescens LeConte, 1878^{i c g b}
- Xyletinus rotundicollis White, 1977^{i c g}
- Xyletinus ruficollis Gebler, 1833^{g}
- Xyletinus sanguineocinctus Fairmaire, 1859^{g}
- Xyletinus sareptanus
- Xyletinus subrotundatus Lareynie, 1852^{g}
- Xyletinus tremulicola Y.Kangas, 1958^{g}
- Xyletinus vaederoeensis Lundberg, 1969^{g}
- Xyletinus wollastoni Gottwald, 1977^{g}

Data sources: i = ITIS, c = Catalogue of Life, g = GBIF, b = Bugguide.net
