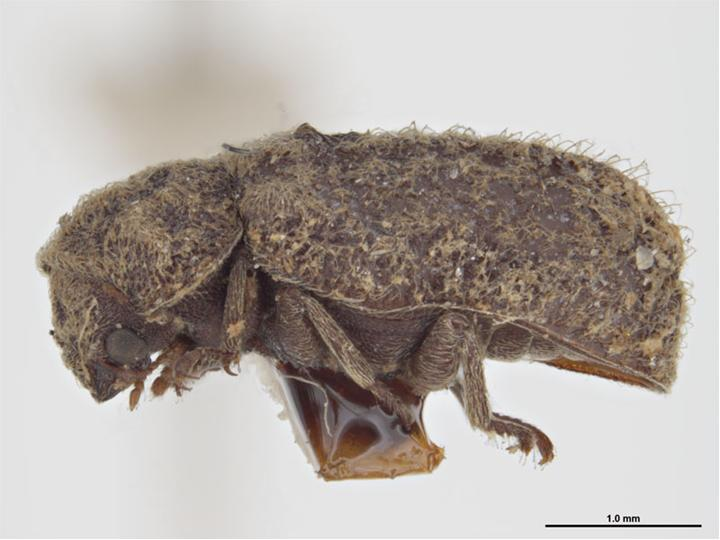
- Endecatomus rugosus

Scientific classification
- Kingdom: Animalia
- Phylum: Arthropoda
- Class: Insecta
- Order: Coleoptera
- Suborder: Polyphaga
- Infraorder: Bostrichiformia
- Superfamily: Bostrichoidea
- Family: Endecatomidae; LeConte, 1861
- Genus: Endecatomus; Mellié, 1847

= Endecatomus =

Genus of beetles

Endecatomus is a genus of beetles, the sole member of the family Endecatomidae. There are at least four described species in Endecatomus. Endecatomidae was formerly treated as a subfamily of Ciidae or Bostrichidae. They are found in the Holarctic region. Adults and larvae feed on the fruiting bodies of bracket fungus, creating bored cavities as they do so.

== Species ==
- Endecatomus dorsalis Mellié, 1848
- Endecatomus lanatus (Lesne, 1934)
- Endecatomus reticulatus (Herbst, 1793)
- Endecatomus rugosus (Randall, 1838)
