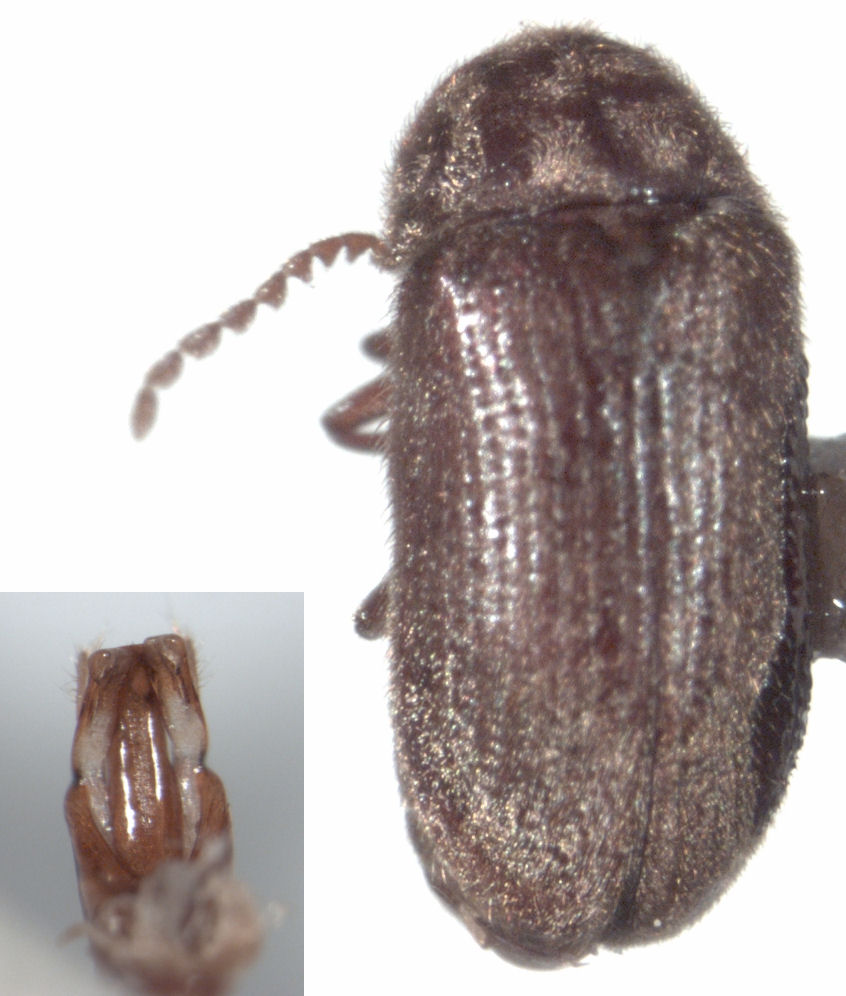
- Xyletobius watti

Scientific classification
- Kingdom: Animalia
- Phylum: Arthropoda
- Clade: Pancrustacea
- Class: Insecta
- Order: Coleoptera
- Suborder: Polyphaga
- Family: Ptinidae
- Subfamily: Xyletininae
- Genus: Xyletobius; Sharp, 1881

= Xyletobius =

Genus of beetles

Xyletobius is a genus of beetles in the family Ptinidae.

== List of species ==
- Xyletobius affinis Sharp, 1885
- Xyletobius aleuritis Perkins, 1910
- Xyletobius ashmeadi Perkins, 1910
- Xyletobius aurifer Perkins, 1910
- Xyletobius beddardi Perkins, 1910
- Xyletobius bidensicola Ford, 1954
- Xyletobius blackburni Perkins, 1910
- Xyletobius brunneri Perkins, 1910
- Xyletobius capucinus (Karsch, 1881)
- Xyletobius carpenteri Perkins, 1910
- Xyletobius chenopodii Ford, 1954
- Xyletobius chryseis Perkins, 1910
- Xyletobius collingei Perkins, 1910
- Xyletobius cyphus Perkins, 1910
- Xyletobius dollfusi Perkins, 1910
- Xyletobius durranti Perkins, 1910
- Xyletobius euceras Perkins, 1910
- Xyletobius euops Perkins, 1910
- Xyletobius euphorbiae Perkins, 1910
- Xyletobius flosculus Perkins, 1910
- Xyletobius forelii Perkins, 1910
- Xyletobius fraternus Perkins, 1910
- Xyletobius gossypii Ford, 1954
- Xyletobius grimshawi Perkins, 1910
- Xyletobius hawaiiensis Perkins, 1910
- Xyletobius insignis Blackburn, 1885
- Xyletobius lasiodes Perkins, 1910
- Xyletobius lineatus Sharp, 1885
- Xyletobius marmoratus Sharp, 1881
- Xyletobius megalops Perkins, 1910
- Xyletobius mesochlorus Perkins, 1910
- Xyletobius meyrickii Perkins, 1910
- Xyletobius mimus Perkins, 1910
- Xyletobius monas Perkins, 1910
- Xyletobius mundus Perkins, 1910
- Xyletobius nigrinus Sharp, 1881
- Xyletobius nudus Perkins, 1910
- Xyletobius nuptus Perkins, 1910
- Xyletobius pele Perkins, 1910
- Xyletobius praeceps Perkins, 1910
- Xyletobius proteus Perkins, 1910
- Xyletobius roridus Perkins, 1910
- Xyletobius scotti Perkins, 1910
- Xyletobius serricornis Blackburn and Sharp, 1885
- Xyletobius silvestrii Perkins, 1910
- Xyletobius sharpi Perkins, 1910
- Xyletobius silvestrii Perkins, 1910
- Xyletobius simoni Perkins, 1910
- Xyletobius speiseri Perkins, 1910
- Xyletobius stebbingi Perkins, 1910
- Xyletobius submimus Perkins, 1910
- Xyletobius suboculatus Perkins, 1910
- Xyletobius sulcatus Perkins, 1910
- Xyletobius sykesii Perkins, 1910
- Xyletobius walsinghamii Perkins, 1910
