= Vrilletta murrayi =

Scientific classification
- Kingdom: Animalia
- Phylum: Arthropoda
- Clade: Pancrustacea
- Class: Insecta
- Order: Coleoptera
- Suborder: Polyphaga
- Family: Ptinidae
- Tribe: Xyletinini
- Genus: Vrilletta
- Species: V. murrayi

Binomial name
- Vrilletta murrayi LeConte, 1874

Species of beetle

Vrilletta murrayi is a species of beetle in the family Ptinidae. It is found in North America.
