= Neoxyletobius =

Scientific classification
- Kingdom: Animalia
- Phylum: Arthropoda
- Class: Insecta
- Order: Coleoptera
- Suborder: Polyphaga
- Infraorder: Bostrichiformia
- Superfamily: Bostrichoidea
- Family: Ptinidae
- Genus: Neoxyletobius; Español & Viñolas, 1996-01

Genus of beetles

Neoxyletobius is a genus of death-watch and spider beetles in the family Ptinidae. There are at least two described species in Neoxyletobius.

== Species ==
These two species belong to the genus Neoxyletobius:

- Neoxyletobius kirkaldyi (Perkins, 1910)
- Neoxyletobius oculatus (Sharp, 1881)
