= Holcobius =

Scientific classification
- Kingdom: Animalia
- Phylum: Arthropoda
- Class: Insecta
- Order: Coleoptera
- Suborder: Polyphaga
- Family: Ptinidae
- Subfamily: Xyletininae
- Genus: Holcobius; Sharp, 1881

Genus of beetles

Holcobius is a genus of beetles in the family Ptinidae.

== Species ==
These 14 species belong to the genus Holcobius:

- Holcobius affinis Perkins, 1910^{i c g}
- Holcobius diversus Perkins, 1910^{i c g}
- Holcobius frater Perkins, 1910^{i c g}
- Holcobius glabricollis Sharp, 1881^{i c g}
- Holcobius granulatus Sharp, 1881^{i c g}
- Holcobius haleakalae Perkins, 1910^{i c g}
- Holcobius hawaiiensis Perkins, 1910^{i c g}
- Holcobius insignis Perkins, 1910^{i c g}
- Holcobius minor Sharp, 1881^{i c g}
- Holcobius mysticus Perkins, 1910^{i c g}
- Holcobius pikoensis Ford, 1955^{i c g}
- Holcobius simplex Perkins, 1935^{i c g}
- Holcobius simulans Perkins, 1910^{i c g}
- Holcobius major Perkins, 1910^{i c g}

Data sources: i = ITIS, c = Catalogue of Life, g = GBIF, b = Bugguide.net
