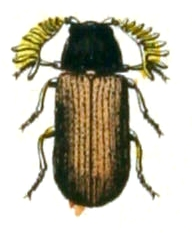
- Ptilinus pectinicornis

Scientific classification
- Kingdom: Animalia
- Phylum: Arthropoda
- Class: Insecta
- Order: Coleoptera
- Suborder: Polyphaga
- Family: Ptinidae
- Subfamily: Ptilininae
- Genus: Ptilinus; O.F.Müller, 1776

= Ptilinus =

Genus of beetles

Ptilinus is a genus of death-watch beetles in the family Ptinidae. It is native to the Palearctic (including Europe), the Near East, the Nearctic, the Neotropical and North Africa. There are at least nine described species in Ptilinus.

== Species ==
These species belong to the genus Ptilinus:

- Ptilinus acuminatus Casey, 1898
- Ptilinus basalis LeConte, 1858
- Ptilinus cylindripennis
- Ptilinus flavipennis Casey, 1898
- Ptilinus fuscus
- Ptilinus lepidus
- Ptilinus lobatus Casey, 1898
- Ptilinus longicornis
- Ptilinus pectinicornis (Linnaeus, 1758)
- Ptilinus pruinosus Casey, 1898
- Ptilinus ramicornis Casey, 1898
- Ptilinus ruficornis Say, 1823
- Ptilinus thoracicus (Randall, 1838)
