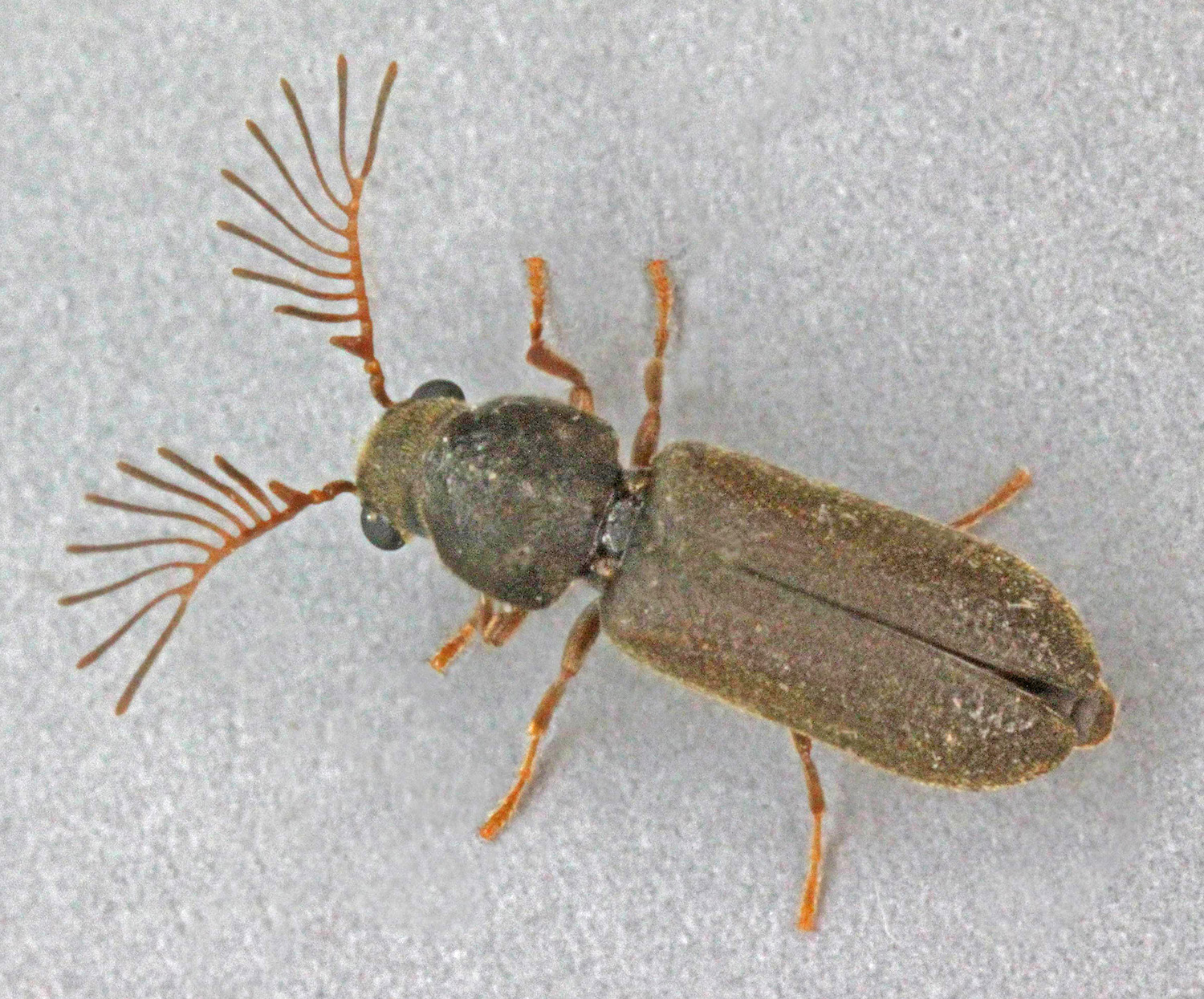
- Ptilinus pectinicornis, Fenns Moss, North Wales

Scientific classification
- Kingdom: Animalia
- Phylum: Arthropoda
- Class: Insecta
- Order: Coleoptera
- Suborder: Polyphaga
- Family: Ptinidae
- Genus: Ptilinus
- Species: P. pectinicornis

Binomial name
- Ptilinus pectinicornis (Linnaeus, 1758)

= Ptilinus pectinicornis =

Species of beetle

Ptilinus pectinicornis, the fan-bearing wood-borer, is a species of beetle in the family Ptinidae.

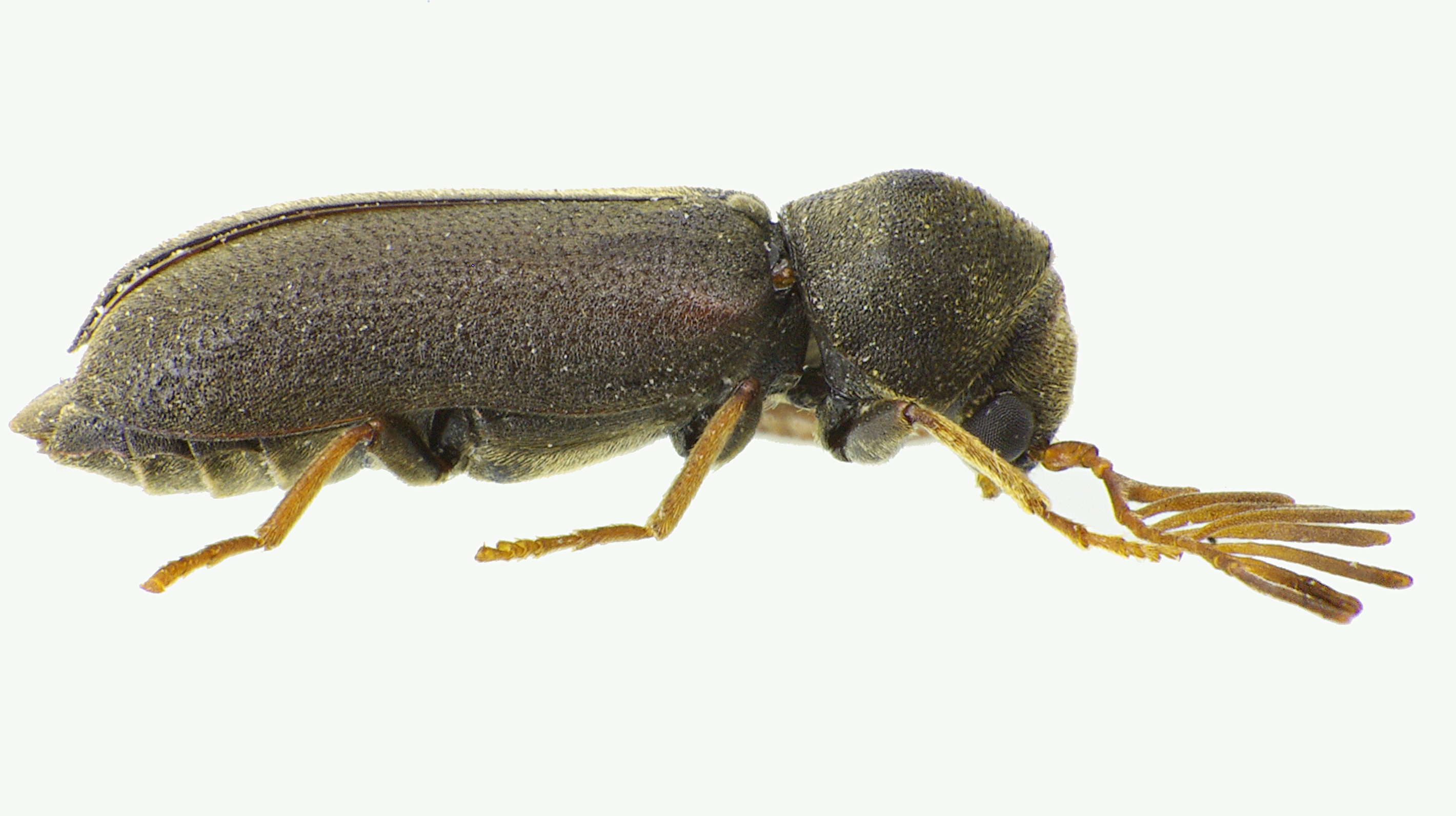
Ptilinus pectinicornis

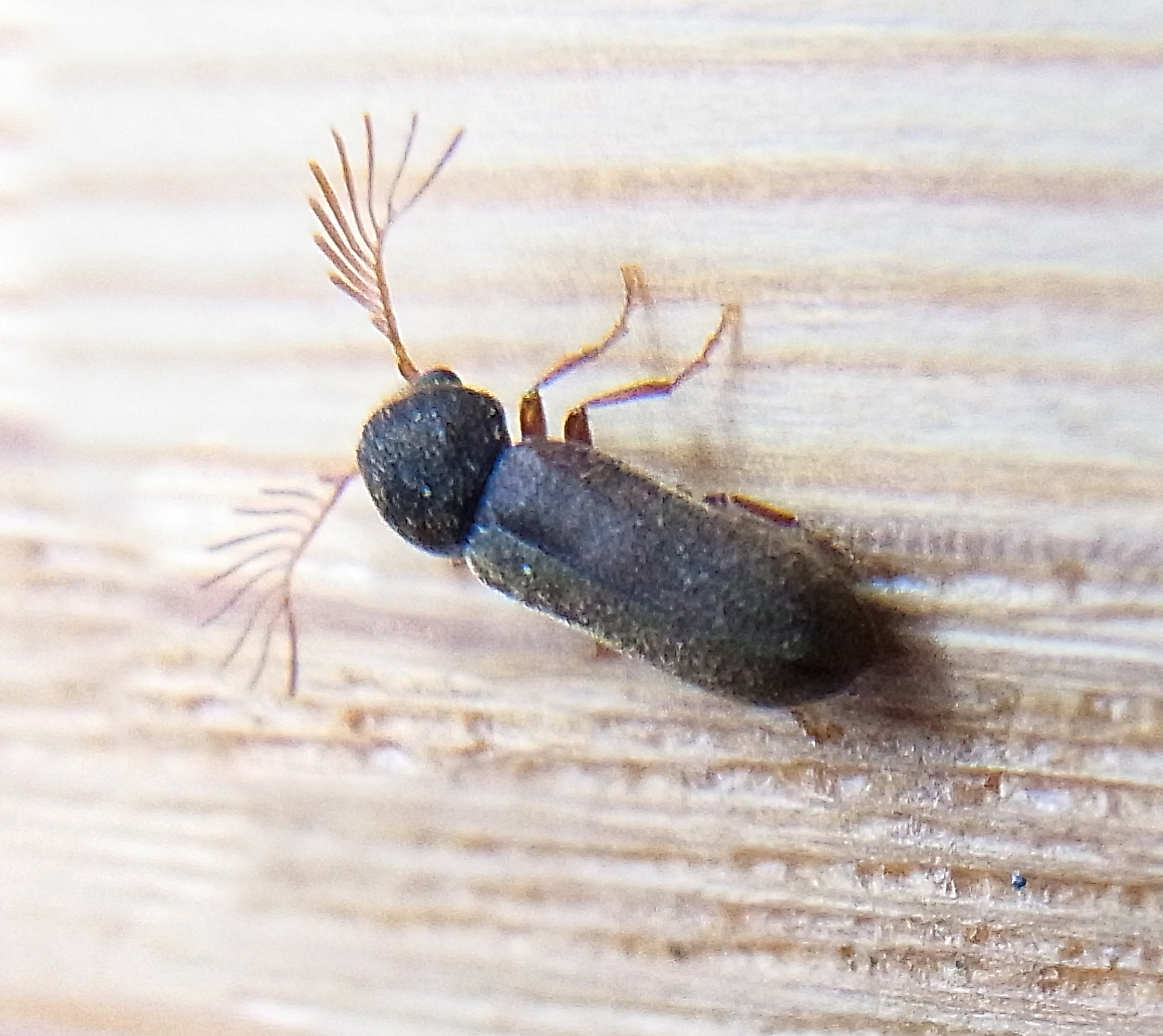
Ptilinus pectinicornis
