= Ptilinus basalis =

Scientific classification
- Kingdom: Animalia
- Phylum: Arthropoda
- Clade: Pancrustacea
- Class: Insecta
- Order: Coleoptera
- Suborder: Polyphaga
- Family: Ptinidae
- Genus: Ptilinus
- Species: P. basalis

Binomial name
- Ptilinus basalis LeConte, 1858

Species of beetle

Ptilinus basalis is a species of beetle in the family Ptinidae. It is found in North America.
