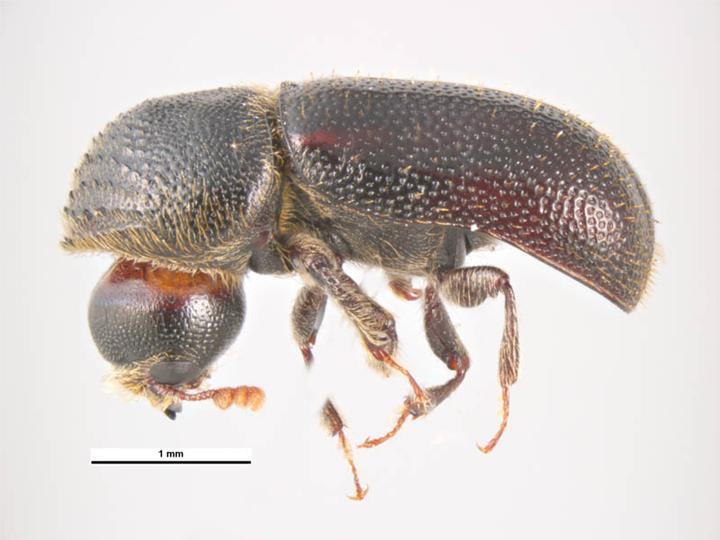
- Dinoderus japonicus

Scientific classification
- Kingdom: Animalia
- Phylum: Arthropoda
- Class: Insecta
- Order: Coleoptera
- Suborder: Polyphaga
- Family: Bostrichidae
- Subfamily: Dinoderinae
- Genus: Dinoderus; Stephens, 1830

Subgenera
- Dinoderus (Dinoderastes) Lesne, 1914; Dinoderus (Dinoderus) Lesne, 1914

= Dinoderus =

Genus of beetles

Dinoderus is a genus of bamboo powderpost beetles in the family Bostrichidae. There are more than 20 described species in Dinoderus.

== Description ==
In adults of Dinoderus, the pronotum is hood-like and conceals the head from above (a feature shared with other Dinoderinae). The body ranges from 2.2 to 4.5 mm in length. The pronotum has posterolateral carina, though these are weakly developed in some species. The elytra are never more than twice as long as the pronotum. The second segment of the antenna is less than half as long as the first segment.

== Pests ==
Some species in this genus, namely D. japonicus, D. minutus, D. ocellaris and D. brevis are major pests of bamboo, attacking both harvested culms and finished products. Adults enter culms via wounds or cut ends, make horizontal tunnels and deposit eggs. These hatch into larvae, which bore longitudinally in culms, making criss-crossing tunnels.

They also attack wood and stored foods, such as yam chips and cassava chips.

== Species ==
These 28 species belong to the genus Dinoderus:

- Dinoderus bifoveolatus (Wollaston, 1858)
- Dinoderus borneanus Lesne, 1933
- Dinoderus brevis Horn, 1878
- Dinoderus creberrimus Lesne, 1941
- Dinoderus cuneicollis Wickham, 1913
- Dinoderus distinctus Lesne, 1897
- Dinoderus exilis Lesne, 1932
- Dinoderus favosus Lesne, 1911
- Dinoderus gabonicus Lesne, 1921
- Dinoderus gardneri Lesne, 1933
- Dinoderus glabripennis Lesne, 1911
- Dinoderus japonicus Lesne, 1895 (Japanese shot-hole borer)
- Dinoderus koi Borowski & Wegrzynowicz, 2013
- Dinoderus mangiferae Lesne, 1921
- Dinoderus minutus (Fabricius, 1775) (bamboo powderpost beetle)
- Dinoderus nitidus Lesne, 1897
- Dinoderus oblongopunctatus Lesne, 1923
- Dinoderus ocellaris Stephens, 1830
- Dinoderus ochraceipennis Lesne, 1906
- Dinoderus papuanus Lesne, 1899
- Dinoderus perfoliatus Gorham, 1886
- Dinoderus perplexus Lesne, 1932
- Dinoderus piceolus Lesne, 1933
- Dinoderus politulus Lesne, 1941
- Dinoderus porcellus Lesne, 1923
- Dinoderus punctatissimus Lesne, 1897
- Dinoderus scabricauda Lesne, 1914
- Dinoderus speculifer Lesne, 1895
