= Ptilinus ruficornis =

Scientific classification
- Kingdom: Animalia
- Phylum: Arthropoda
- Clade: Pancrustacea
- Class: Insecta
- Order: Coleoptera
- Suborder: Polyphaga
- Family: Ptinidae
- Genus: Ptilinus
- Species: P. ruficornis

Binomial name
- Ptilinus ruficornis Say, 1823

Synonyms
- Ptilinus bicolor Melsheimer, 1846

Species of beetle

Ptilinus ruficornis is a species of beetle in the family Ptinidae. It is found in North America and Europe.
