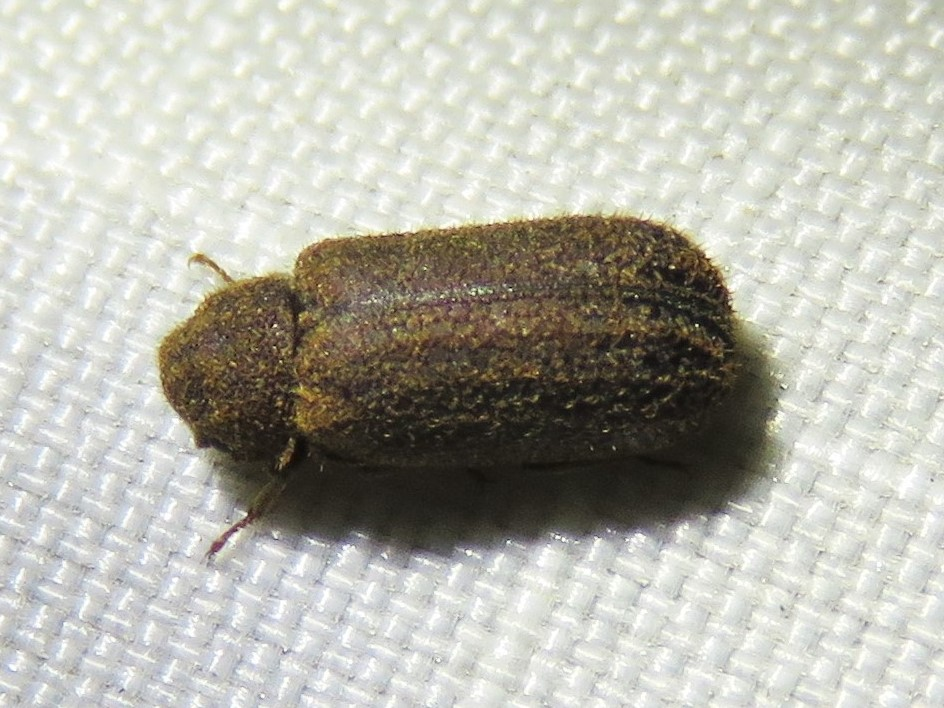

Scientific classification
- Kingdom: Animalia
- Phylum: Arthropoda
- Class: Insecta
- Order: Coleoptera
- Suborder: Polyphaga
- Family: Endecatomidae
- Genus: Endecatomus
- Species: E. dorsalis

Binomial name
- Endecatomus dorsalis Mellié, 1848

= Endecatomus dorsalis =

Species of beetle

Endecatomus dorsalis is a species of beetle in the family Endecatomidae. It is found in the southern United States.

The adults and larvae of this beetle feed on bracket fungus, such as species of Polyporaceae and Hymenochaetaceae.
