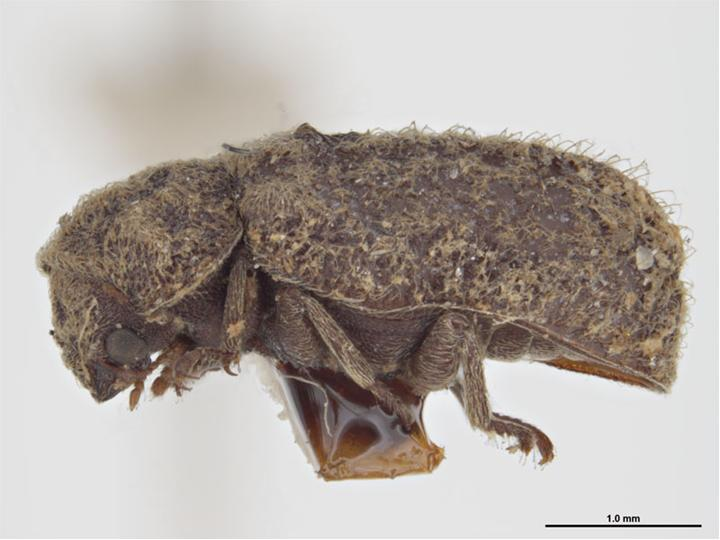

Scientific classification
- Domain: Eukaryota
- Kingdom: Animalia
- Phylum: Arthropoda
- Class: Insecta
- Order: Coleoptera
- Suborder: Polyphaga
- Family: Endecatomidae
- Genus: Endecatomus
- Species: E. rugosus

Binomial name
- Endecatomus rugosus (Randall, 1838)

= Endecatomus rugosus =

Species of beetle

Endecatomus rugosus is a species of beetle in the family Endecatomidae. It is found in North America.
