= Euvrilletta mucorea =

Scientific classification
- Kingdom: Animalia
- Phylum: Arthropoda
- Clade: Pancrustacea
- Class: Insecta
- Order: Coleoptera
- Suborder: Polyphaga
- Family: Ptinidae
- Genus: Euvrilletta
- Species: E. mucorea

Binomial name
- Euvrilletta mucorea (LeConte, 1865)

Species of beetle

Euvrilletta mucorea is a species of beetle in the family Ptinidae. It is found in North America.

== Subspecies ==
These two subspecies belong to the species Euvrilletta mucorea:

- Euvrilletta mucorea mucorea (LeConte, 1865)
- Euvrilletta mucorea variabilis (White, 1973)
