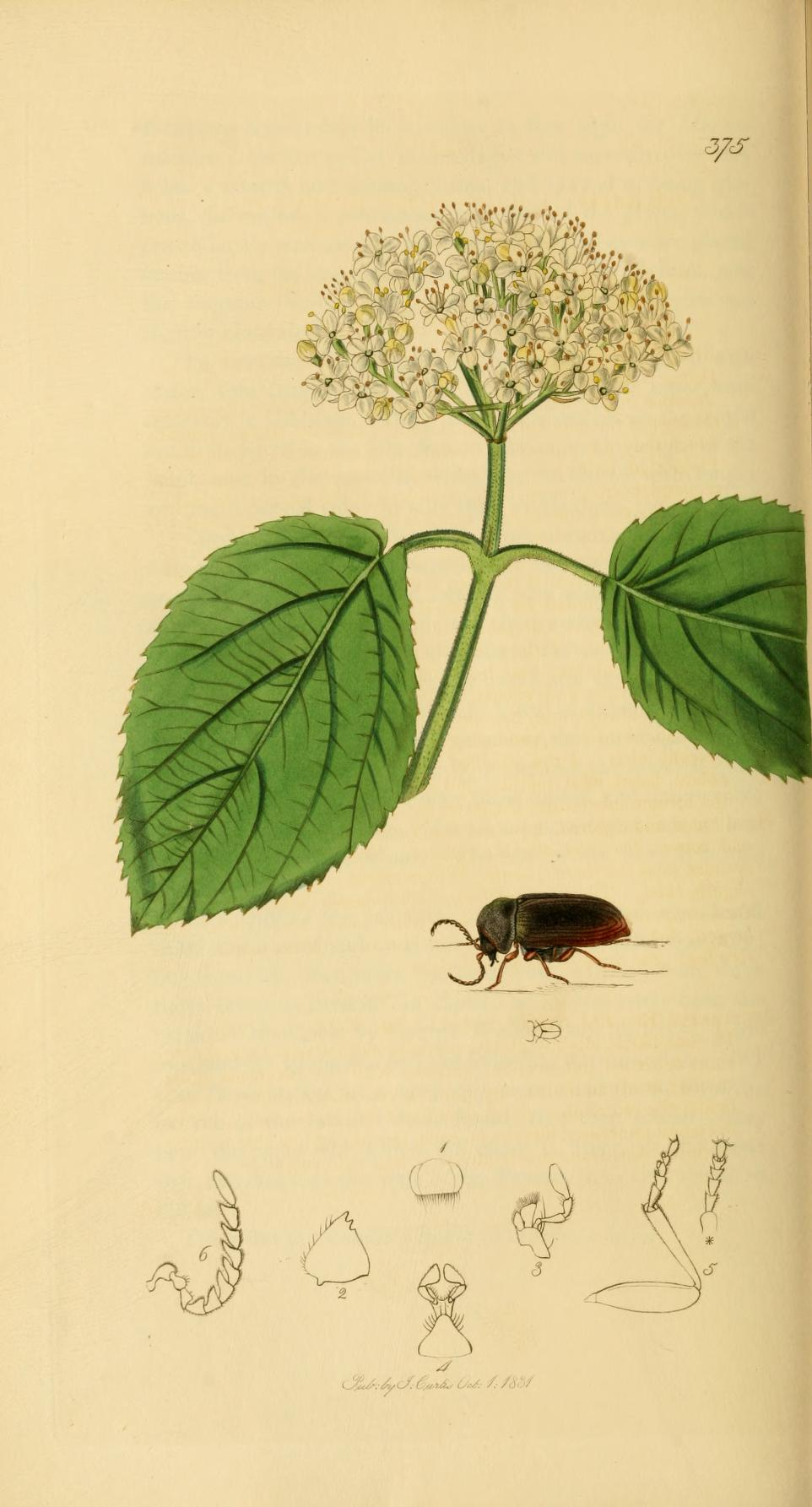

Scientific classification
- Kingdom: Animalia
- Phylum: Arthropoda
- Class: Insecta
- Order: Coleoptera
- Suborder: Polyphaga
- Family: Ptinidae
- Genus: Xyletinus
- Species: X. longitarsis

Binomial name
- Xyletinus longitarsis Jansson, 1942

= Xyletinus longitarsis =

Species of beetle

Xyletinus longitarsis is a species of beetle in the family Ptinidae.
