= Ptilinus acuminatus =

Scientific classification
- Kingdom: Animalia
- Phylum: Arthropoda
- Clade: Pancrustacea
- Class: Insecta
- Order: Coleoptera
- Suborder: Polyphaga
- Family: Ptinidae
- Genus: Ptilinus
- Species: P. acuminatus

Binomial name
- Ptilinus acuminatus Casey, 1898

Species of beetle

Ptilinus acuminatus is a species of beetle in the family Ptinidae. It is found in North America.
