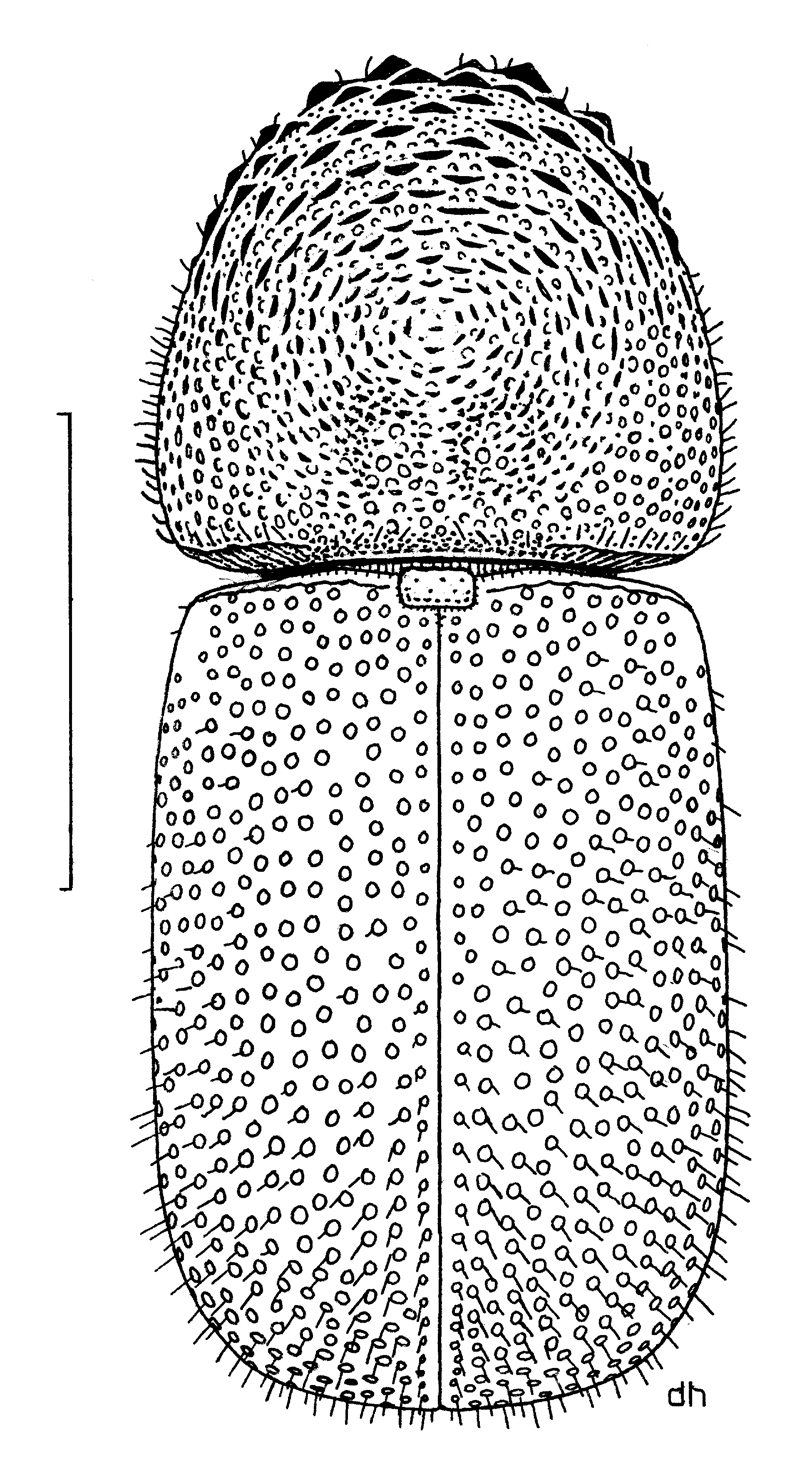

Scientific classification
- Kingdom: Animalia
- Phylum: Arthropoda
- Clade: Pancrustacea
- Class: Insecta
- Order: Coleoptera
- Suborder: Polyphaga
- Family: Bostrichidae
- Genus: Dinoderus
- Species: D. minutus

Binomial name
- Dinoderus minutus (Fabricius, 1775)

= Dinoderus minutus =

Species of beetle

Dinoderus minutus, the bamboo borer, is a species of wood-boring beetle. In tropical regions (and perhaps others), it is one of the main pests of bamboo, attracted by the internal starch. It is native to Asia but has spread widely with the trade of infested bamboo wood and bamboo products.

== Identification ==
The bamboo borer lays very small (0.84 mm in length) elongated oval eggs. These eggs are milky white, almost transparent. Eggs are laid in dirt tunnels foraged by adult beetles.

The larvae form is three to four millimeters long. They show a C-shaped body with a round head. The thorax is slightly expanded and bears three legs. Bamboo borer larvae show oval/round spiracles on their thorax and abdomen. Larvae also have dense hair covering their tibia. The larval period lasts approximately 61 days.

Following the larvae stage, bamboo borers enter the pupae form. The pupa is spindle shaped and 2.5 to 4 millimeters long. The pupa is milky-white with black compound eyes and mandible. They also carry a pair of finger-like appendages attached to the end of the sternum.

The adult borer shape is elongated and columnar. Adult species range from 2.5 to 3.5 mm long and 1 to 1.5 mm wide. They are reddish or dark brown with dense hair coverage, especially on the elytra (wing cover). The elytra are densely covered with small punctures and bristles. An important feature of the borer is that the head is dorsally covered by the prothorax. This means that the head cannot be perceived from a top view of the insect. Dinoderus minutus shows black round compound eyes. The antennas are segmented in approximately 10 segments and are lamellated. The legs show the same color as the body. The tarsus (feet) is made of five segments. The first and last segments are equal in length but the first is no longer than the third or fourth segments.

== Original range ==
The bamboo borer originates from Asia, most commonly from China. It is currently established as a native species in many Chinese cities including Beijing, Fujian, Guangdong, Sichuan, and Hong Kong among many. It is also recognized as a native species in some nations surrounding China. The bamboo borer is considered native in India, Indonesia, Japan, Malaysia, Philippines, and Sri Lanka. The bamboo borer is one of the main pests affecting bamboo plants in tropical regions.

== Site and year of introduction ==
The bamboo borer was introduced in countries outside of China and Asia. The bamboo borer was introduced in Israel according to a study dating from 1999. The coleoptera arrived in Czechia in 1965. The borer was first reported in Germany back in 1927. Dinoderus minutus made its way in Italy in 1995 and in Norway in 1980 (Fig 1.).

Country	Year of Introduction	Report
Israel	prior to 1999	Gerstmeier et al., 1999
Czechia	1965	Seebens et al., 2017
Italy	1995	Seebens et al., 2017
Norway	1990	Seebens et al., 2017
Sweden	1957 (first reported)	Seebens et al., 2017
Germany	1927 (first reported)	Seebens et al., 2017
Cuba	prior to 1986	Wu et al., 1986
California (U.S.)	1960's	Woodruff, 1967
Florida (U.S.)	1960's	Woodruff, 1967
Australia	1915	Seebens et al., 2017
Brazil	prior to 1986	Wu et al., 1986
Chile	prior to 1986	Wu et al., 1986

Figure 1: List of introduction sites and years for the bamboo borer

== Current distribution ==
Currently, Dinoderus minutus can be found on most continents. It is found in Africa in countries such as Congo, Côte d'Ivoire, Ghana, Zimbabwe, and Zambia. It is commonly found in Asia, notably China, where it is considered native. The bamboo borer is also considered native in Hong Kong, India, Indonesia, Japan, and Malaysia. The bamboo borer is also found in south-east Asia. The borer can still be found in many parts of Europe including Czechia, Germany, Italy, Norway, and Sweden. Cuba, Trinidad and Tobago, and the United States constitute the North American range of the bamboo borer. Florida and California are where borers are most commonly found in the U.S. It has been deemed invasive in Florida already. The borer was introduced in Oceania in the early to mid-1900's. Australia, Fiji, New Zealand, Papua New Guinea, and Solomon Islands all carry bamboo borer populations. The insect is also found in South America in Brazil, Chile, and Columbia.

== Modes of distribution and introduction ==
D. minutus is a post-harvest pest that feeds on bamboo and bamboo-based products. The borer can easily be transported across the globe through the trade of domestic and imported bamboo products. Furniture and other items made of bamboo are the principal cause for the spread of the insect. The above ground structures (shoot, trunk, branches) and wood of the bamboo tree are the only parts that borers will attach to. The insect is uninterested in the bark, flowers, leaves, roots, and seeds of the bamboo. Clothing, footwear, personal possessions, and land vehicles have also been identified as pathway vectors for the spread of Dinoderus minutus.

== Ecological role ==
Bamboo borers can have between 3 and 5 generations per year (CABI, 2019). Adult borers are charged to dig 15 to 20 mm tunnels in bamboo wood for females to lay their eggs (approximately 20 at a time). Oviposition is most commonly observed in May and June for this species. Oviposition can last up to four months and leads to degradation of bamboo wood. Overwintering is not distinct amongst the species, but cold temperature reduces their activity. Soluble carbohydrates are essential to D. minutus' diet. The varying richness of nutrient in bamboo species make certain trees such as Bambusa textilis, Bambusa pervariabilis, Phyllostachys heterocycle, and Phyllostachys heteroclada more desirable than Pleioblastus amarus and Pseudosasa amabilis for example. D. minutus has a strong ability for starvation tolerance. The adults have a strong ability for pesticide resistance and have no phototactic reaction toward light.

The bamboo borer has few natural reported predators. However, the Teretrius nigrescens and Denops albofasciata are known to predate on the eggs, larvae, pupae, and adults (mostly the eggs).

As a coleoptera, the borer is a prominent decomposer of organic matter. They reduce the population of insects through feeding and niche competition.

== Factors in establishment ==
Dinoderus minutus' main factor for establishment is the presence of bamboo trees. The borer feeds on bamboo and lays its eggs in bamboo. The insect is resilient to starvation and pesticides which makes it an efficient invader. Additionally, the bamboo borer can withstand relatively cold temperatures and doesn't perform overwintering. The invasiveness efficiency of the borer resides in its ability to thrive in various environments and climates.

== Benefits and threats ==
Borers have been reported to be the most damaging pest in the Asian bamboo industry. Dinoderus minutus' ability to feed on felled culm and finished products results in direct loss of raw material and processed products. Although the extent of losses attributed to borers have not been assessed, a large stack of bamboo in a storage yard can lose 40% of its volume due to borer activity in 8 to 20 months. The advantages of beetles reside in their ability to decompose organic matter. Notably, the bamboo borer will return carbon from dead bamboo wood back to the soil for other organisms to use. It is only when bamboo is meant for commercial purposes that its decomposition becomes an issue.

== Control methods ==
A variety of control measures have been identified to prevent bamboo borer infestations. These measures comprise phytosanitary methods, biological control, physical methods, and chemical control. Determining the better methods for pest control depends on factors such as severity of infestation, location, potential of reinfestation, and cost.

Phytosanitary methods mostly relate to international trade and transport as bamboo borers have the potential to cause important damage to plants when introduced in a new environment. All imported wood and wood products are inspected in open ports. If borer infestation symptoms are detected, pest control such as fumigation and heating often represent safe alternatives.

Biological control is another way to keep borer populations in check. Notably, Clerid beetles prey on borers in boring tunnels. These predators feed on the bamboo borers eggs, larvae, pupae, and sometimes adults. However, even if natural enemies of the borer have the potential to cause high mortality rates in borer population, natural enemies cannot be relied upon as an effective control method.

Physical control relates to bamboo wood treatment post felling. One of the methods simply involves soaking the wood in water which suffocates the beetles, but it takes a long time and it risks blackening the culms. Other methods include flame heating, exposure to sunlight, microwaving, and advanced infrared technology.

Chemical treatments involving pesticides and preservatives have been widely used to control pest post-harvest. Different compounds have shown positive control. The 5% copper-chrome-arsenic composition, 5-6% copper-potassium dichromate-borax solution (CCB), and 2-3% borax all represent efficient options for post-harvest pest control.

== Status of mitigation ==
Although there is little information on the overall status of the borer as an invader, it is still considered harmful in a variety of environments including agricultural land, orchards, forests, grasslands, urban areas, riverbanks, wetlands, tundra, deserts, and coastal areas.
