= Euvrilletta =

Scientific classification
- Kingdom: Animalia
- Phylum: Arthropoda
- Class: Insecta
- Order: Coleoptera
- Suborder: Polyphaga
- Family: Ptinidae
- Tribe: Xyletinini
- Genus: Euvrilletta; Fall, 1905

Synonyms
- Oligomerodes Fall, 1905

Genus of insects

Euvrilletta is a genus of death-watch and spider beetles in the family Ptinidae. There are about 14 described species in Euvrilletta.

== Species ==
These 14 species belong to the genus Euvrilletta:

- Euvrilletta arizonica White, 1976^{i c g}
- Euvrilletta brunnea White, 1985^{i c g}
- Euvrilletta catalinae (Fall, 1905)^{i c g}
- Euvrilletta distans (Fall, 1905)^{i c g}
- Euvrilletta grossa (Van Dyke, 1946)^{i c g}
- Euvrilletta harrisii (Fall, 1905)^{i c g b}
- Euvrilletta hirsuta White, 1985^{i c g}
- Euvrilletta mucorea (LeConte, 1865)^{i c g b}
- Euvrilletta occidentalis (Fall, 1905)^{i c g}
- Euvrilletta peltata (Harris, 1836)^{i c g b} (anobiid powderpost beetle)
- Euvrilletta sequoiae (Van Dyke, 1946)^{i c g}
- Euvrilletta serricornis White, 1973^{i c g}
- Euvrilletta texana Van Dyke, 1946^{i c g}
- Euvrilletta xyletinoides Fall, 1905^{i c g}

Data sources: i = ITIS, c = Catalogue of Life, g = GBIF, b = Bugguide.net
