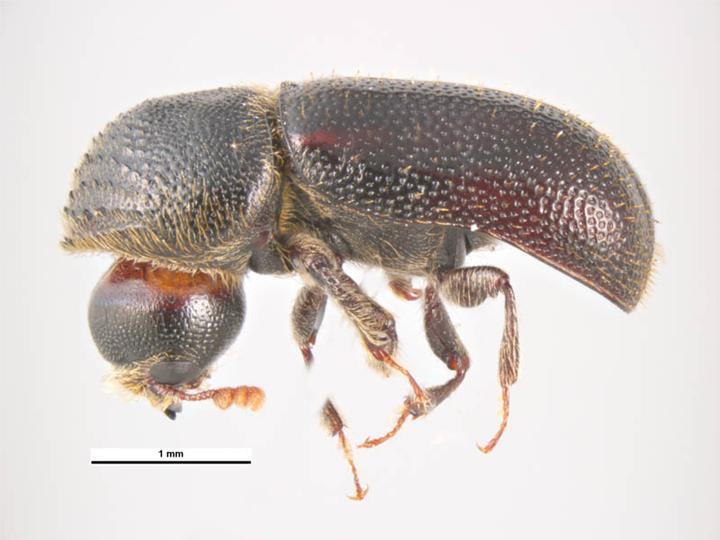

Scientific classification
- Domain: Eukaryota
- Kingdom: Animalia
- Phylum: Arthropoda
- Class: Insecta
- Order: Coleoptera
- Suborder: Polyphaga
- Family: Bostrichidae
- Genus: Dinoderus
- Species: D. japonicus

Binomial name
- Dinoderus japonicus Lesne, 1895

= Dinoderus japonicus =

Species of beetle

Dinoderus japonicus, the Japanese shot-hole borer, is a species of horned powder-post beetle in the family Bostrichidae. It is found in Australia, Europe and Northern Asia (excluding China), North America, and Southern Asia.
