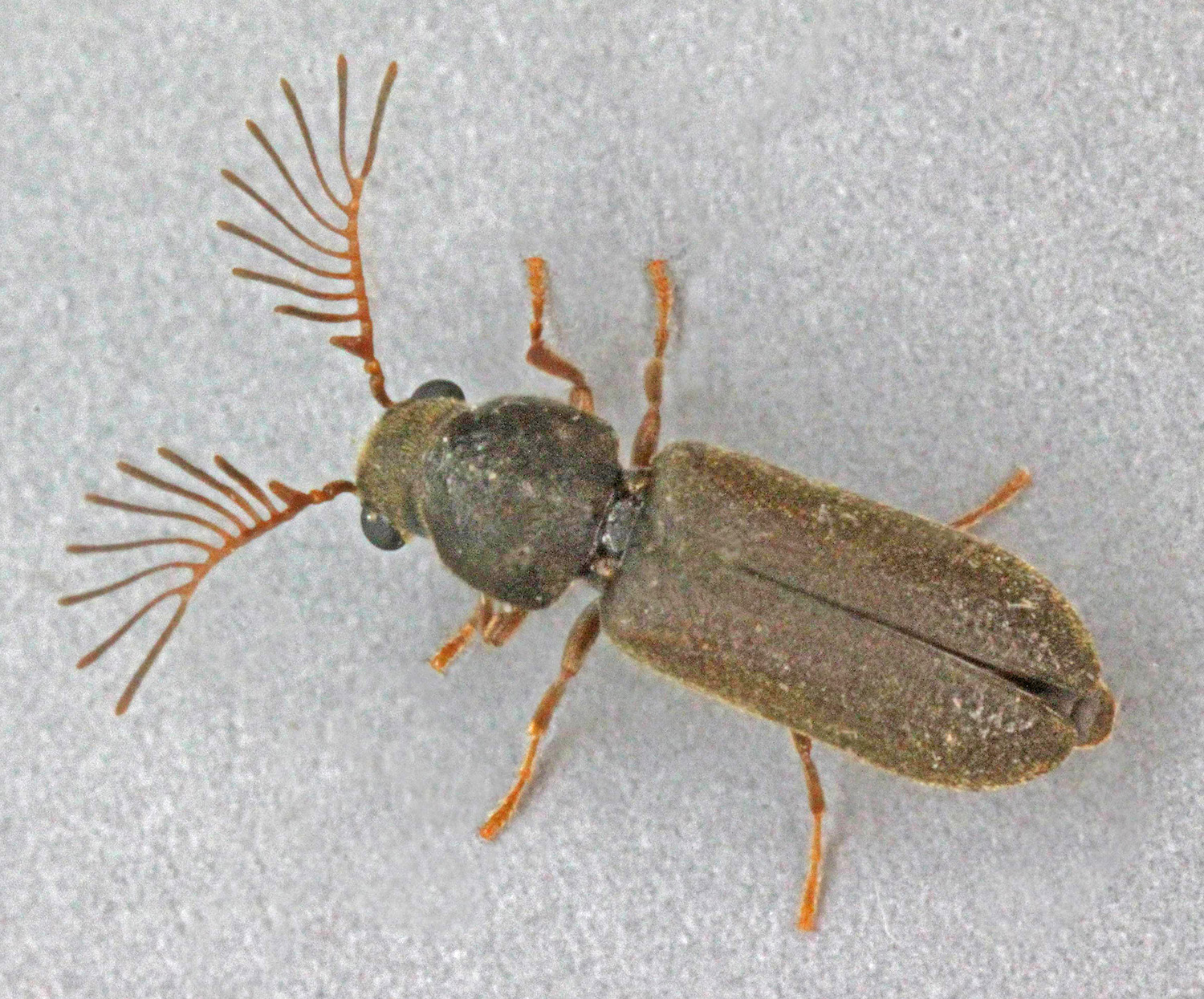
- Ptilinus pectinicornis

Scientific classification
- Kingdom: Animalia
- Phylum: Arthropoda
- Class: Insecta
- Order: Coleoptera
- Suborder: Polyphaga
- Family: Ptinidae
- Subfamily: Ptilininae; Shuckard, 1840

= Ptilininae =

Subfamily of beetles

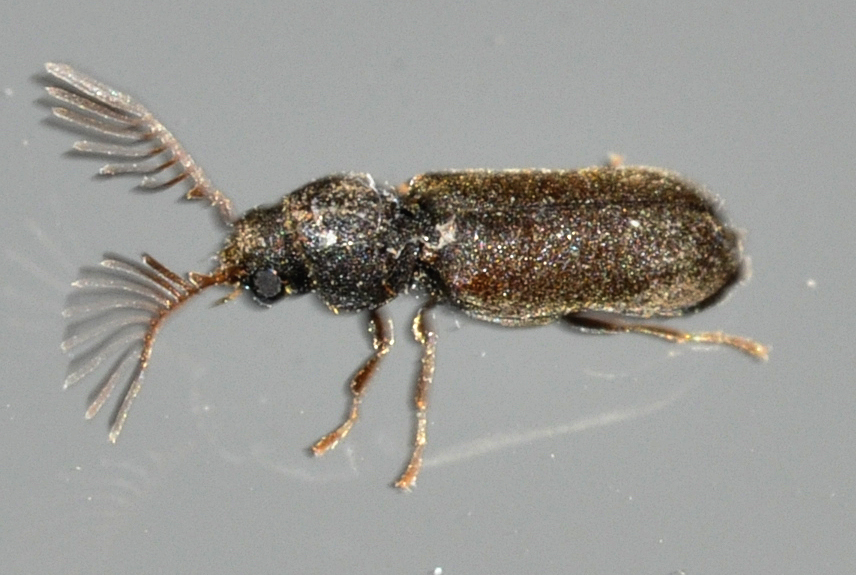
Ptilinus pectinicornis

Ptilininae is a subfamily of death-watch beetles in the family Ptinidae.

The subfamily Ptilininae, along with Anobiinae and several others, were formerly considered members of the family Anobiidae, but the family name has since been changed to Ptinidae.

== Genera ==
- Fallanobium
- Nepalanobium
- Phanerochila
- Plumilus
- Ptilinus
- Yunnanobium
