= Vrilletta =

Scientific classification
- Kingdom: Animalia
- Phylum: Arthropoda
- Class: Insecta
- Order: Coleoptera
- Suborder: Polyphaga
- Family: Ptinidae
- Tribe: Xyletinini
- Genus: Vrilletta; LeConte, 1874

Type species
- Vrilletta murrayi LeConte, 1874

Synonyms
- Pseudoxyletinus Pic, 1903

Genus of beetles

Vrilletta is a genus of beetles in the family Ptinidae.

== Species ==
These 10 species belong to the genus Vrilletta:

- Vrilletta blaisdelli Fall, 1905^{i c g b}
- Vrilletta californica Fisher, 1939^{i c g}
- Vrilletta convexa LeConte, 1874^{i c g}
- Vrilletta decorata Van Dyke, 1918^{i c g b}
- Vrilletta expansa LeConte, 1874^{i c g}
- Vrilletta fulvolineata (Pic, 1903)^{i c g}
- Vrilletta laurentina Fall, 1905^{i c g}
- Vrilletta murrayi LeConte, 1874^{i c g b}
- Vrilletta nigra (Pic, 1905)^{i c g}
- Vrilletta plumbea Fall, 1905^{i c g}

Data sources: i = ITIS, c = Catalogue of Life, g = GBIF, b = Bugguide.net
