= Xyletomerus =

Scientific classification
- Kingdom: Animalia
- Phylum: Arthropoda
- Class: Insecta
- Order: Coleoptera
- Suborder: Polyphaga
- Family: Ptinidae
- Tribe: Xyletinini
- Genus: Xyletomerus; Fall, 1905

Synonyms
- Xyletomeridius Español, 1968

Genus of beetles

Xyletomerus is a genus of death-watch and spider beetles in the family Ptinidae. There are at least two described species in Xyletomerus.

== Species ==
These two species belong to the genus Xyletomerus:

- Xyletomerus arbuti (Fisher, 1919)^{i c g}
- Xyletomerus histricus Fall, 1905^{i c g b}

Data sources: i = ITIS, c = Catalogue of Life, g = GBIF, b = Bugguide.net
