= Pseudoptilinus =

Scientific classification
- Kingdom: Animalia
- Phylum: Arthropoda
- Class: Insecta
- Order: Coleoptera
- Suborder: Polyphaga
- Family: Ptinidae
- Tribe: Xyletinini
- Genus: Pseudoptilinus; Leiler, 1963

Genus of beetles

Pseudoptilinus is a genus of beetles in the family Ptinidae. There is at least one described species in Pseudoptilinus, P. fissicollis.
