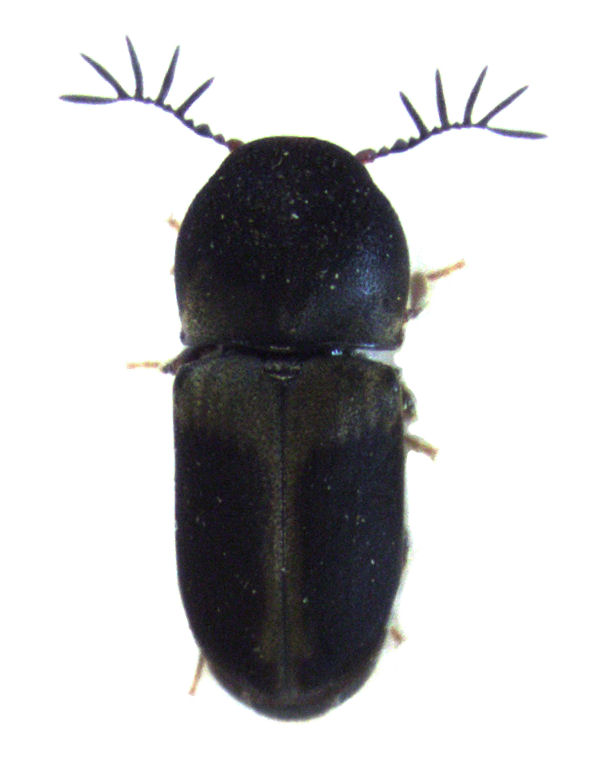

Scientific classification
- Kingdom: Animalia
- Phylum: Arthropoda
- Class: Insecta
- Order: Coleoptera
- Suborder: Polyphaga
- Family: Ptinidae
- Genus: Deroptilinus
- Species: D. granicollis

Binomial name
- Deroptilinus granicollis Lea, 1924

= Deroptilinus granicollis =

Species of beetle

Deroptilinus granicollis is an Australian beetle in the family Ptinidae. The family also includes deathwatch beetles and spider beetles.

== Description ==
Beetles of this species range from 3.75 to 4.25 mm in length. The overall colour is black, with the elytral humeri and apices and the legs being reddish, and the basal segments of the antennae and tarsi being paler. They are densely covered in short ashen pubescence which is somewhat variegated on the elytra. The front of the prothorax has coarse granules, similar to many Bostrichidae and Scolytinae. Some segments of each antenna have long rami (branches).

== Distribution ==
Deroptilinus granicollis occurs throughout eastern Australia, ranging from Queensland down to Tasmania. It has also been recorded from New Zealand where it is exotic.

== Ecology ==
This species is associated with sapwood of Eucalyptus saligna.
