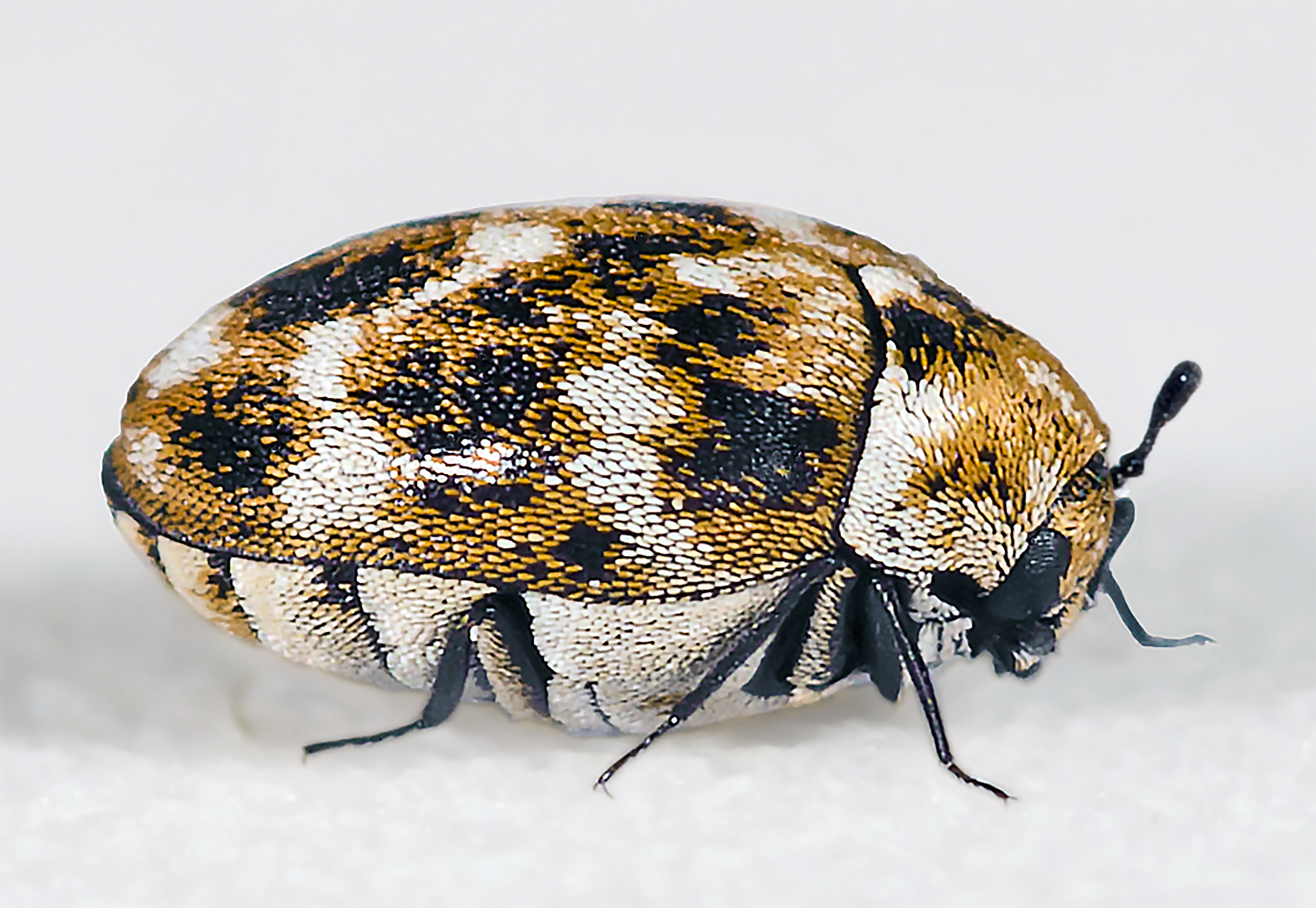
- Anthrenus verbasci, a skin beetle

Scientific classification
- Kingdom: Animalia
- Phylum: Arthropoda
- Clade: Pancrustacea
- Class: Insecta
- Order: Coleoptera
- Suborder: Polyphaga
- Infraorder: Bostrichiformia; Forbes, 1926

Superfamilies
- Bostrichoidea; Derodontoidea

= Bostrichiformia =

Infraorder of beetles

Bostrichiformia is an infraorder of polyphagan beetles.

It contains two superfamilies, Derodontoidea and Bostrichoidea, which includes the Dermestidae, Ptinidae, Bostrichidae and others.
