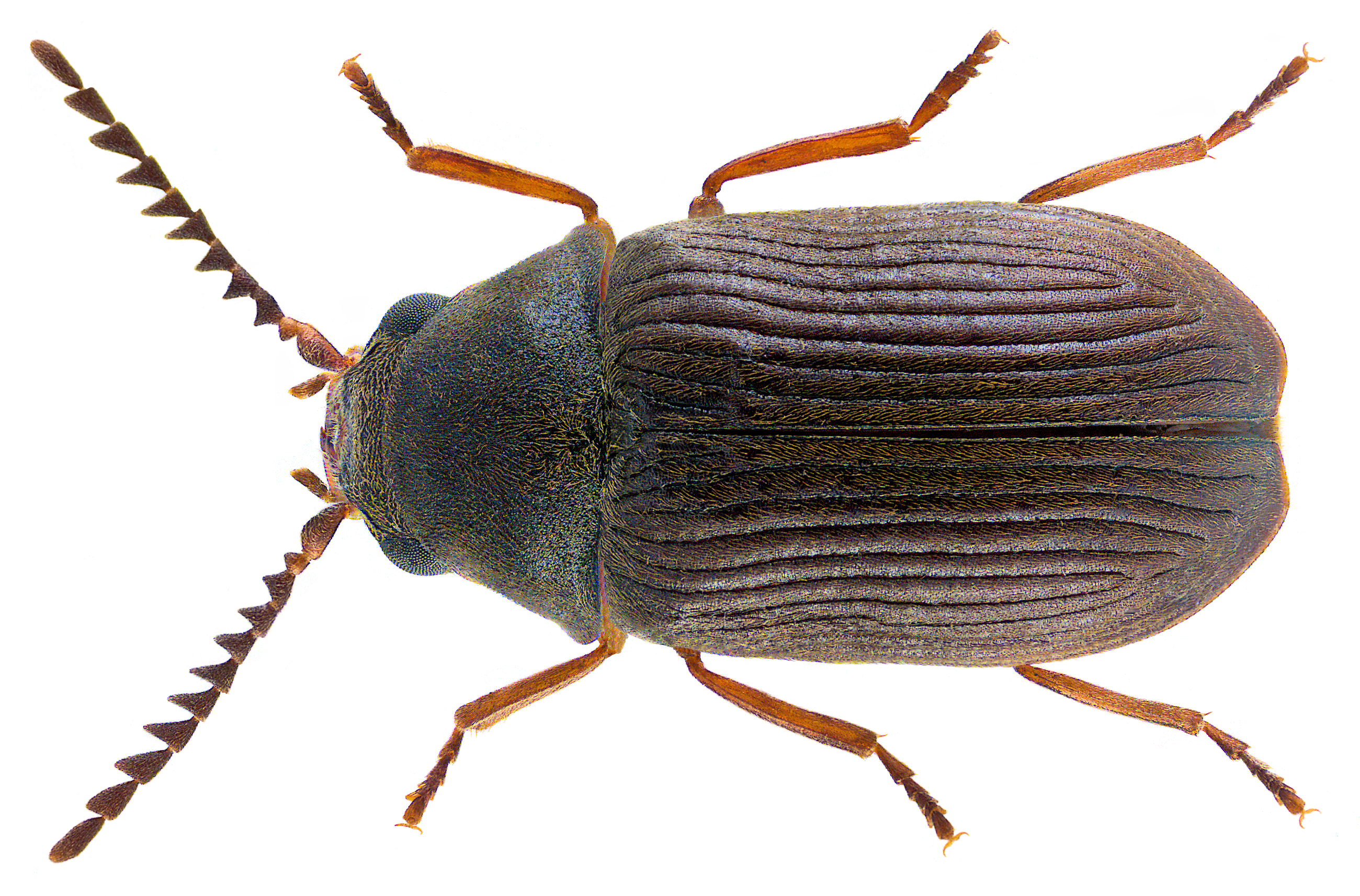
- Xyletinus longitarsus

Scientific classification
- Kingdom: Animalia
- Phylum: Arthropoda
- Class: Insecta
- Order: Coleoptera
- Suborder: Polyphaga
- Family: Ptinidae
- Subfamily: Xyletininae
- Tribe: Xyletinini; Gistl, 1848

= Xyletinini =

Tribe of beetles

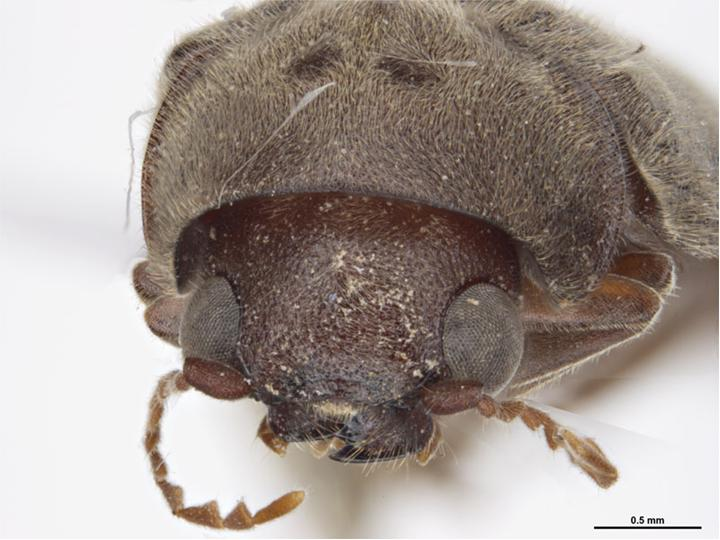
Xyletinus

Xyletinini is a tribe of death-watch and spider beetles in the family Ptinidae. There are at least 10 genera and 70 described species in Xyletinini.

== Genera ==
These 10 genera belong to the tribe Xyletinini:

- Euvrilletta Fall, 1905^{i c g b}
- Neoxyletinus Español, 1983
- Paraxyletinus Espaol, 1972^{g}
- Pseudoptilinus Leiler, 1963^{g}
- Trachelobrachys Gemminger, 1870^{g}
- Vrilletta LeConte, 1874^{i c g b}
- Xyletinodes Español, 1983
- Xyletinomorphus Pic, 1923
- Xyletinus Latreille, 1809^{i c g b}
- Xyletomerus Fall, 1905^{i c g b}

Data sources: i = ITIS, c = Catalogue of Life, g = GBIF, b = Bugguide.net
