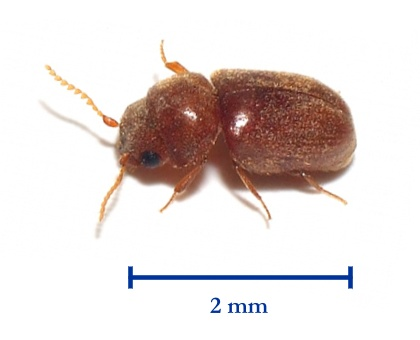
- Lasioderma serricorne, drugstore beetle

Scientific classification
- Kingdom: Animalia
- Phylum: Arthropoda
- Clade: Pancrustacea
- Class: Insecta
- Order: Coleoptera
- Suborder: Polyphaga
- Family: Ptinidae
- Subfamily: Xyletininae; Gistel, 1848

= Xyletininae =

Subfamily of beetles

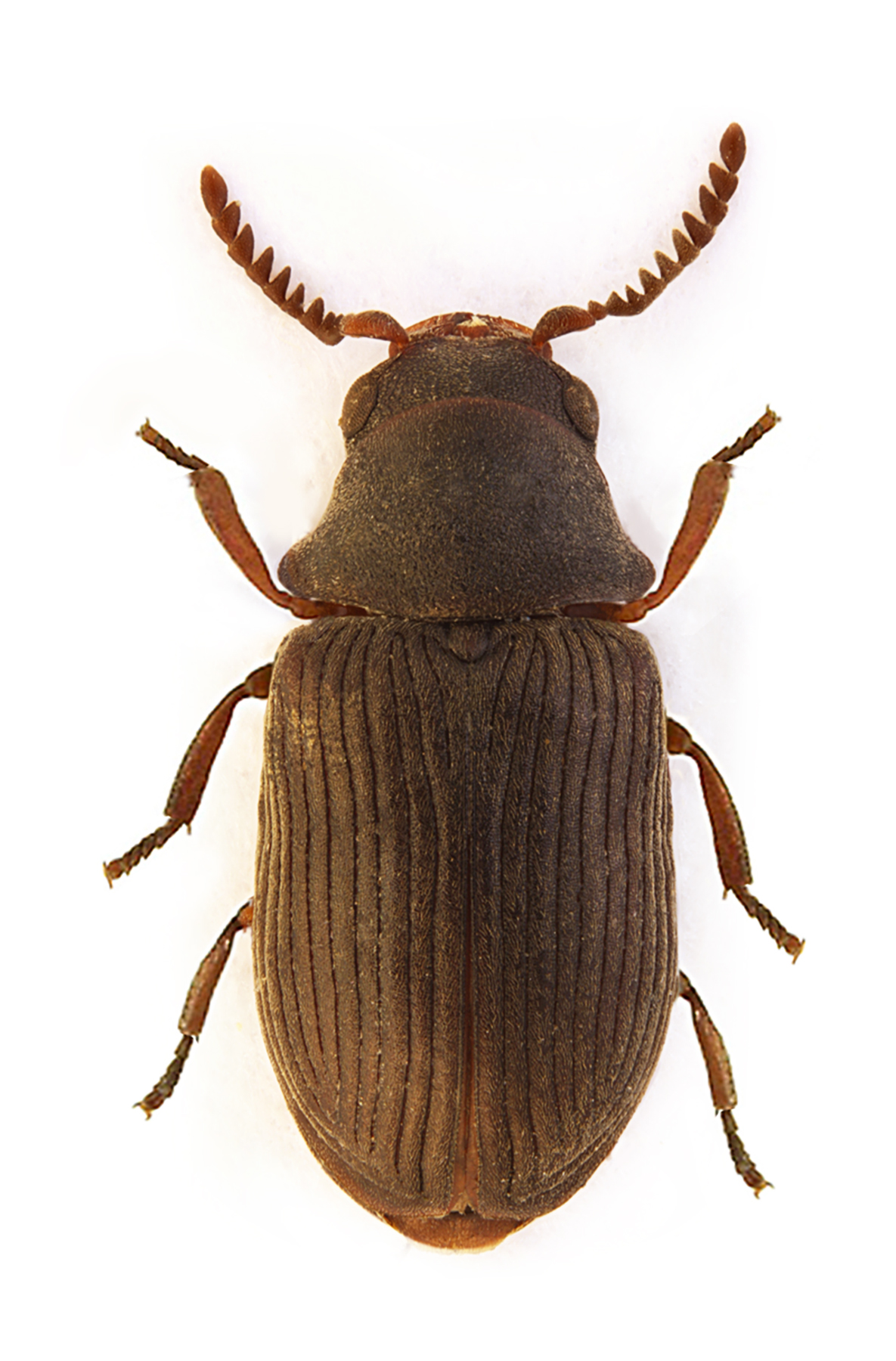
Xyletinus ater

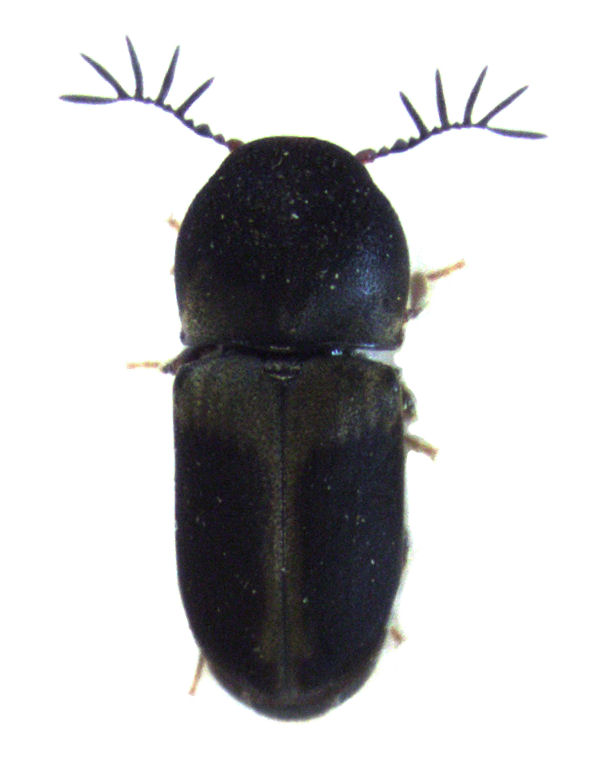
Deroptilinus granicollis

Xyletininae is a subfamily of death-watch and spider beetles in the family Ptinidae. There are about 13 genera and at least 170 described species in Xyletininae.

The subfamily Xyletininae, along with Anobiinae and several others, were formerly considered members of the family Anobiidae, but the family name has since been changed to Ptinidae.

== Genera ==
These 13 genera belong to the subfamily Xyletininae:

- Deroptilinus Lea, 1924^{g}
- Euvrilletta Fall, 1905^{i c g b}
- Holcobius Sharp, 1881^{i c g}
- Lasioderma Stephens, 1835^{i c g b}
- Megorama Fall, 1905^{i c g b}
- Metholcus Jacquelin du Val, 1860^{g}
- Neoxyletobius Español & Viñolas, 1996-01^{i c g}
- Paraxyletinus Espaol, 1972^{g}
- Pseudoptilinus Leiler, 1963^{g}
- Trachelobrachys Gemminger, 1870^{g}
- Vrilletta LeConte, 1874^{i c g b}
- Xyletinites Heyden, 1866^{g}
- Xyletinus Latreille, 1809^{i c g b}
- Xyletomerus Fall, 1905^{i c g b}

Data sources: i = ITIS, c = Catalogue of Life, g = GBIF, b = Bugguide.net
