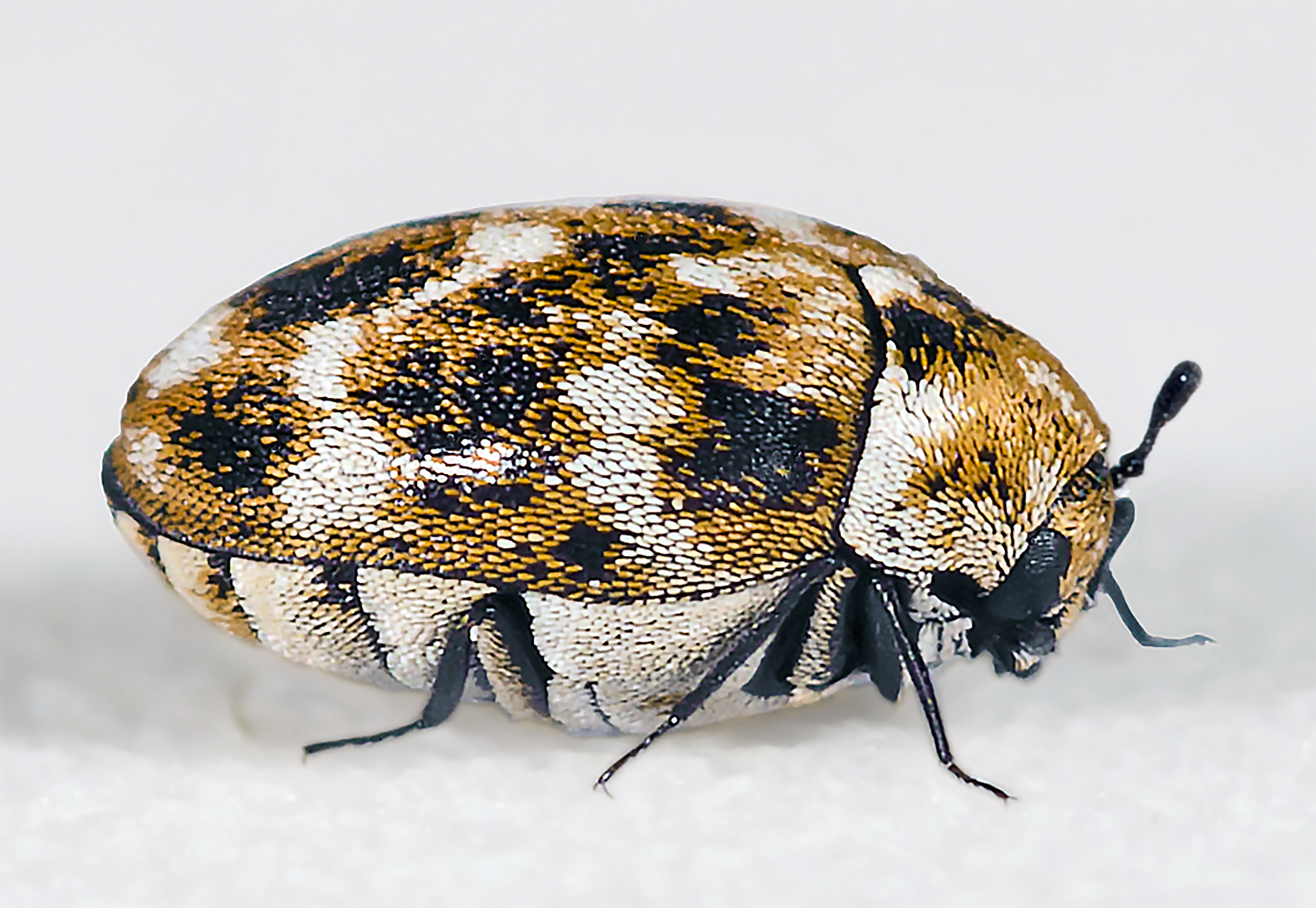
- Anthrenus verbasci (Dermestidae)

Scientific classification
- Kingdom: Animalia
- Phylum: Arthropoda
- Clade: Pancrustacea
- Class: Insecta
- Order: Coleoptera
- Suborder: Polyphaga
- Infraorder: Bostrichiformia
- Superfamily: Bostrichoidea; Latreille, 1802

= Bostrichoidea =

Bostrichoidea Temporal range: Norian–Recent

Superfamily of beetles

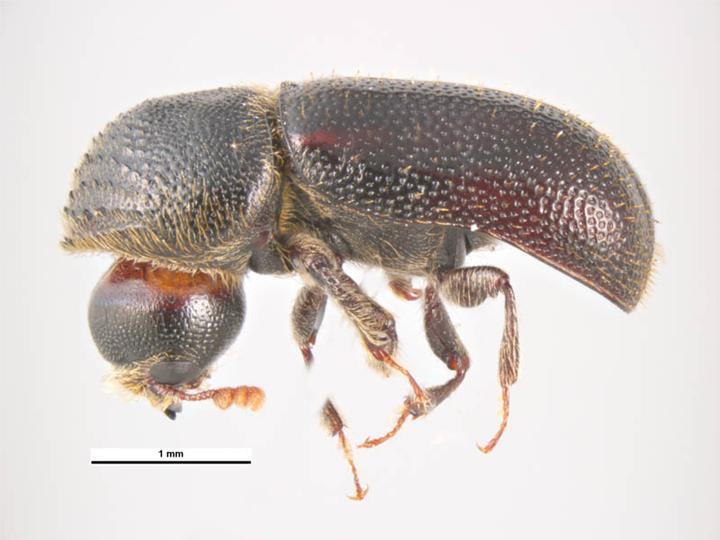
Dinoderus japonicus (Bostrichidae)

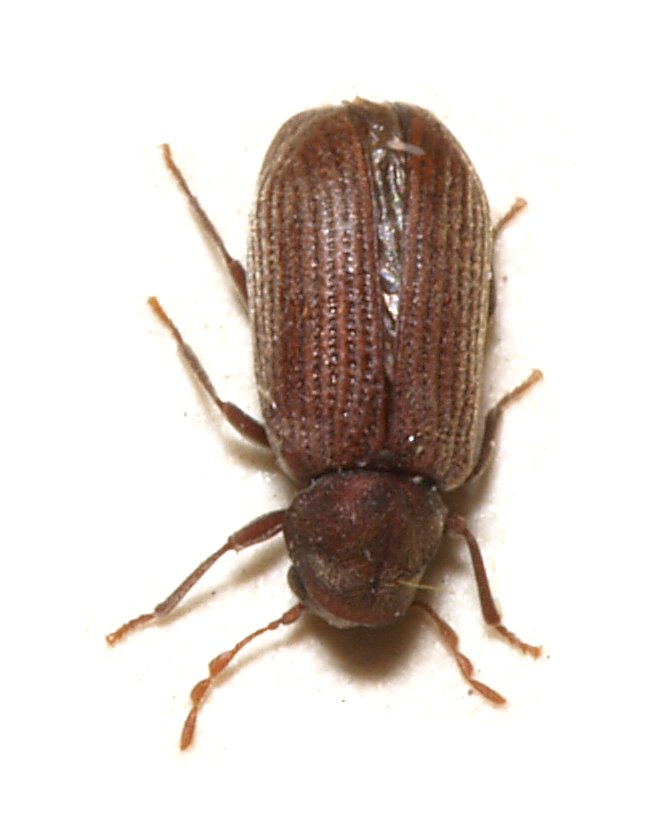
Anobium punctatum (Ptinidae)

Bostrichoidea is a superfamily of beetles. It is the type superfamily of the infraorder Bostrichiformia.

== Description ==
The Bostrichoidea are united by the following features: modified cryptonephridism, the structure of the aedeagus in males, and the lack of a basal mandibular mola in larvae.

Aside from this, Bostrichoidea show a range of morphologies. For example, in Bostrichidae alone, the adult body shape varies from convex to flattened, the body length from 2 to 50 mm (0.079 to 1.969 in), and the colour may be yellow, brown or black and sometimes has a metallic hue.

== Ecology ==
Bostrichoids generally live in dry habitats. For example, many Bostrichidae feed on wood, though some attack monocotyledonous plants as well and Rhyzopertha dominica feeds on stored grains and cereal products. Similarly, most Ptinidae are wood-borers as larvae but some feed on other dry plant or animal material, such as stored foods, tobacco and museum specimens. Dermestidae are typically scavengers on dried organic matter with a high protein content, with some species being predators or feeding on pollen and nectar.

== Families and subfamilies ==
Bostrichoidea includes the following subgroups:

- Family Bostrichidae Latreille, 1802 - Horned Powder-post Beetles
  - Subfamily Bostrichinae Latreille, 1802
  - Subfamily Dinoderinae Thomson, 1863
  - Subfamily Dysidinae Lesne, 1921
  - Subfamily Euderiinae Lesne, 1934
  - Subfamily Lyctinae Billberg, 1820 - Powder-post Beetles
  - Subfamily Polycaoninae Lesne, 1896
  - Subfamily Psoinae Blanchard, 1851
- Family Dermestidae Latreille, 1804 - Carpet Beetles
  - Subfamily Attageninae Laporte, 1840
  - Subfamily Dermestinae Latreille, 1804
  - Subfamily Megatominae Leach, 1815
  - Subfamily Orphilinae LeConte, 1861
  - Subfamily Thorictinae Agassiz, 1846
  - Subfamily Trinodinae Casey, 1900
- Family Endecatomidae LeConte, 1861
- Family Ptinidae Latreille, 1802 (formerly Anobiidae)
  - Subfamily Alvarenganiellinae Viana and Martínez, 1971
  - Subfamily Anobiinae Fleming, 1821 - Death-watch Beetles
  - Subfamily Dorcatominae Thomson, 1859
  - Subfamily Dryophilinae Gistel, 1848
  - Subfamily Ernobiinae Pic, 1912
  - Subfamily Eucradinae LeConte, 1861
  - Subfamily Mesocoelopodinae Mulsant and Rey, 1864
  - Subfamily Ptilininae Shuckard, 1839
  - Subfamily Ptininae Latreille, 1802 - Spider Beetles
  - Subfamily Xyletininae Gistel, 1848
