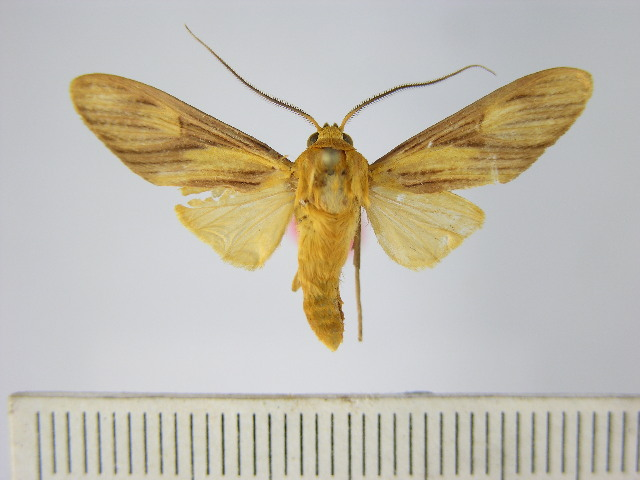
- Phaeomolis vampa

Scientific classification
- Kingdom: Animalia
- Phylum: Arthropoda
- Class: Insecta
- Order: Lepidoptera
- Superfamily: Noctuoidea
- Family: Erebidae
- Subfamily: Arctiinae
- Subtribe: Phaegopterina
- Genus: Phaeomolis; Hampson, 1901

= Phaeomolis =

Genus of moths

Phaeomolis is a genus of moths in the family Erebidae.

== Species ==
- Phaeomolis bertrandi
- Phaeomolis brunnescens
- Phaeomolis curvenal
- Phaeomolis lineatus
- Phaeomolis obnubila
- Phaeomolis obscurata
- Phaeomolis ochreogaster
- Phaeomolis polystria
- Phaeomolis tavakiliani
- Phaeomolis vampa

== Former species ==
- Phaeomolis similis
