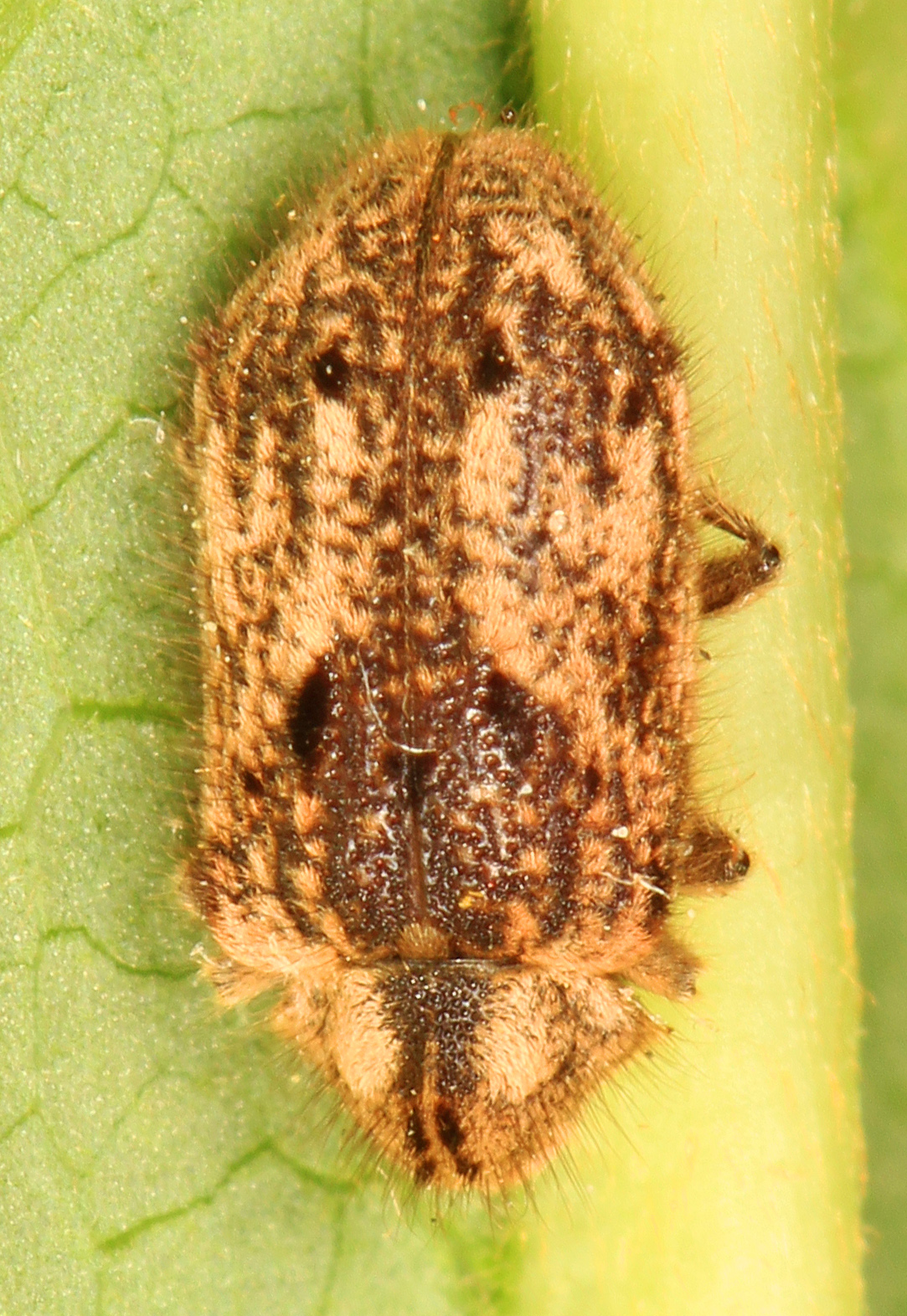

Scientific classification
- Kingdom: Animalia
- Phylum: Arthropoda
- Clade: Pancrustacea
- Class: Insecta
- Order: Coleoptera
- Suborder: Polyphaga
- Family: Ptinidae
- Subfamily: Anobiinae
- Genus: Trichodesma; LeConte, 1861

Synonyms
- Microtrichodesma LeConte, 1861; Ptinodes Pic, 1931

= Trichodesma (beetle) =

Genus of beetles

Trichodesma is a genus of death-watch beetles in the family Ptinidae. There are about 11 described species in Trichodesma.

== Species ==
These 11 species belong to the genus Trichodesma:

- Trichodesma cristata (Casey, 1890)^{i c g b}
- Trichodesma fuliginosa White, 1981^{i c g} [= sordidum Horn, 1894 per Schnepp, 2025]
- Trichodesma gibbosa (Say, 1825)^{i c g b}
- Trichodesma klagesi Fall, 1905^{i c g b}
- Trichodesma kurosawai Sakai, 1986^{g}
- Trichodesma pratti Fisher, 1919^{i c g}
- Trichodesma pulchella Schaeffer, 1903^{i c g b}
- Trichodesma sellata Horn, 1894^{i c g}
- Trichodesma setifera (LeConte, 1858)^{i c g}
- Trichodesma sordida Horn, 1894^{i c g b}
- Trichodesma texana Schaeffer, 1903^{i c g b}

Data sources: i = ITIS, c = Catalogue of Life, g = GBIF, b = Bugguide.net
