= Epidesma josioides =

Scientific classification
- Domain: Eukaryota
- Kingdom: Animalia
- Phylum: Arthropoda
- Class: Insecta
- Order: Lepidoptera
- Superfamily: Noctuoidea
- Family: Erebidae
- Subfamily: Arctiinae
- Genus: Epidesma
- Species: E. josioides

Binomial name
- Epidesma josioides (Zerny, 1931)

Synonyms
- Desmotricha josioides Zerny, 1931

Species of moth

Epidesma josioides is a moth of the subfamily Arctiinae. It was described by Zerny in 1931. It is found in Brazil.
