= Epidesma hoffmannsi =

Scientific classification
- Domain: Eukaryota
- Kingdom: Animalia
- Phylum: Arthropoda
- Class: Insecta
- Order: Lepidoptera
- Superfamily: Noctuoidea
- Family: Erebidae
- Subfamily: Arctiinae
- Genus: Epidesma
- Species: E. hoffmannsi

Binomial name
- Epidesma hoffmannsi (Rothschild, 1912)

Synonyms
- Trichodesma hoffmannsi Rothschild, 1912

Species of moth

Epidesma hoffmannsi is a moth of the subfamily Arctiinae. It was described by Rothschild in 1912. It is found in Peru.
