= Epidesma crameri =

Scientific classification
- Domain: Eukaryota
- Kingdom: Animalia
- Phylum: Arthropoda
- Class: Insecta
- Order: Lepidoptera
- Superfamily: Noctuoidea
- Family: Erebidae
- Subfamily: Arctiinae
- Genus: Epidesma
- Species: E. crameri

Binomial name
- Epidesma crameri (Travassos, 1938)

Synonyms
- Desmotricha crameri Travassos, 1938

Species of moth

Epidesma crameri is a moth of the subfamily Arctiinae. It was described by Travassos in 1938. It is found in Brazil.
