= Epidesma obliqua =

Scientific classification
- Domain: Eukaryota
- Kingdom: Animalia
- Phylum: Arthropoda
- Class: Insecta
- Order: Lepidoptera
- Superfamily: Noctuoidea
- Family: Erebidae
- Subfamily: Arctiinae
- Genus: Epidesma
- Species: E. obliqua

Binomial name
- Epidesma obliqua (Schaus, 1898)

Synonyms
- Trichodesma obliqua Schaus, 1898

Species of moth

Epidesma obliqua is a moth of the subfamily Arctiinae. It was described by William Schaus in 1898. It is found in Rio de Janeiro, Brazil.
