= Phaeomolis obscurata =

Scientific classification
- Domain: Eukaryota
- Kingdom: Animalia
- Phylum: Arthropoda
- Class: Insecta
- Order: Lepidoptera
- Superfamily: Noctuoidea
- Family: Erebidae
- Subfamily: Arctiinae
- Genus: Phaeomolis
- Species: P. obscurata

Binomial name
- Phaeomolis obscurata (Butler, 1877)

Synonyms
- Neritos obscurata Butler, 1877

Species of moth

Phaeomolis obscurata is a moth of the family Erebidae first described by Arthur Gardiner Butler in 1877. It is found in Brazil.
