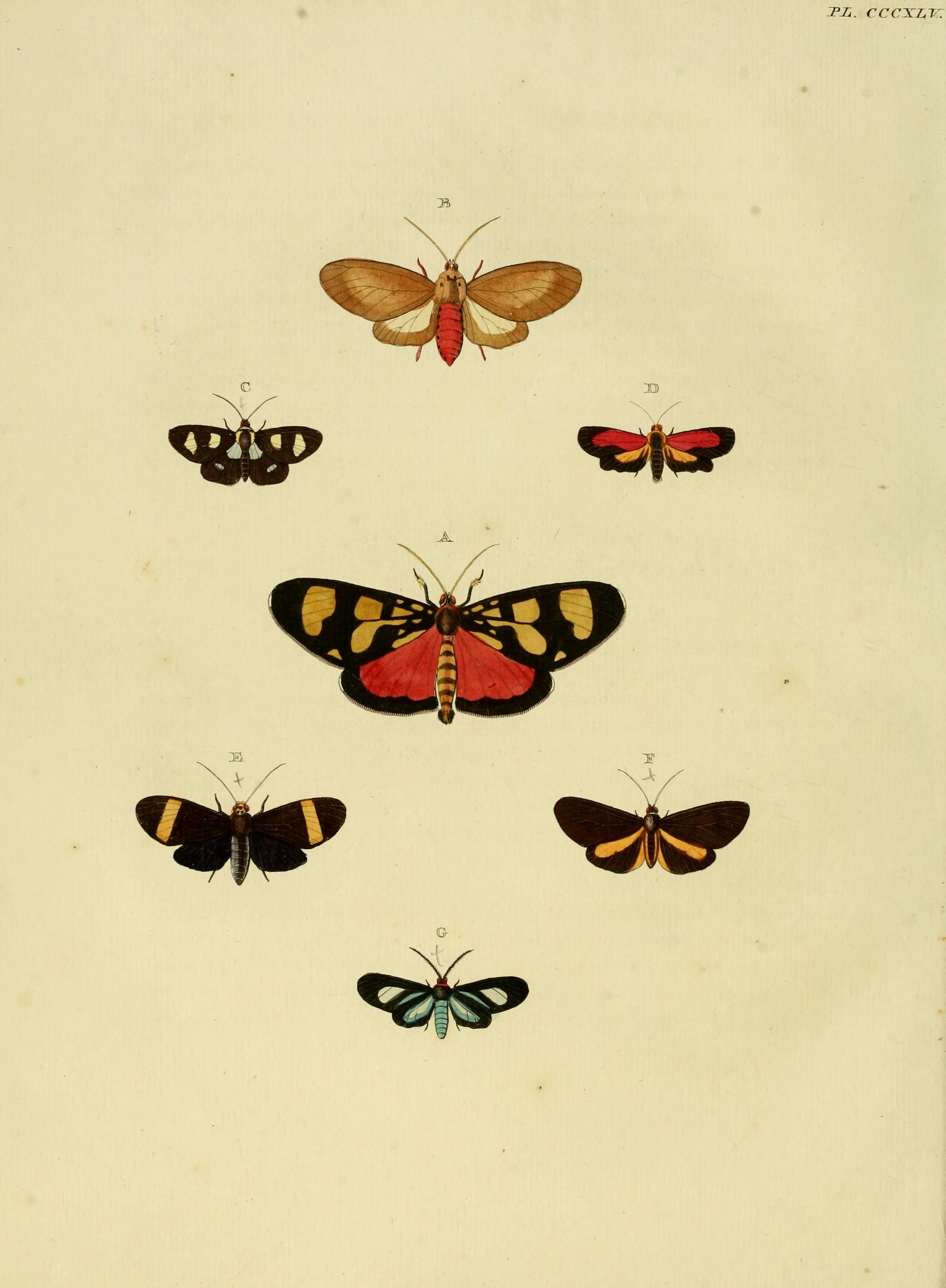
- E: "(Phalaena) Ursula" ( = Epidesma ursula (Stoll, [1781])

Scientific classification
- Domain: Eukaryota
- Kingdom: Animalia
- Phylum: Arthropoda
- Class: Insecta
- Order: Lepidoptera
- Superfamily: Noctuoidea
- Family: Erebidae
- Subfamily: Arctiinae
- Genus: Epidesma
- Species: E. ursula

Binomial name
- Epidesma ursula (Stoll, [1781])

Synonyms
- Phalaena ursula Stoll, [1781]; Noctua ursula

= Epidesma ursula =

Species of moth

Epidesma ursula is a moth of the subfamily Arctiinae. It was described by Caspar Stoll in 1781. It is found in Suriname and the Amazon region.
