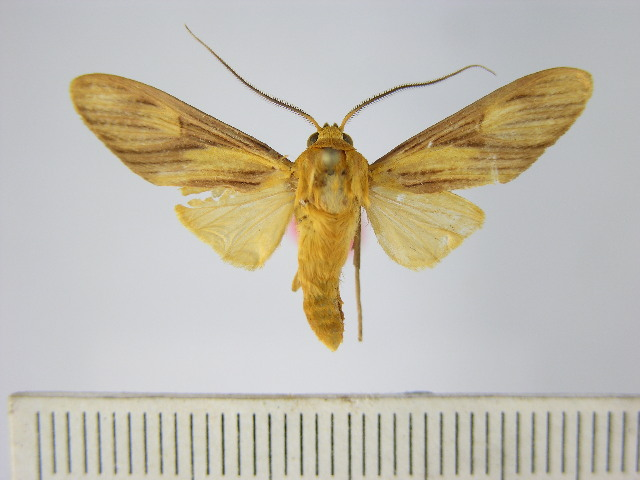

Scientific classification
- Domain: Eukaryota
- Kingdom: Animalia
- Phylum: Arthropoda
- Class: Insecta
- Order: Lepidoptera
- Superfamily: Noctuoidea
- Family: Erebidae
- Subfamily: Arctiinae
- Genus: Phaeomolis
- Species: P. vampa

Binomial name
- Phaeomolis vampa (Schaus, 1910)

Synonyms
- Automolis vampa Schaus, 1910

= Phaeomolis vampa =

Species of moth

Phaeomolis vampa is a moth of the family Erebidae first described by William Schaus in 1910. It is found in Nicaragua and Costa Rica.
