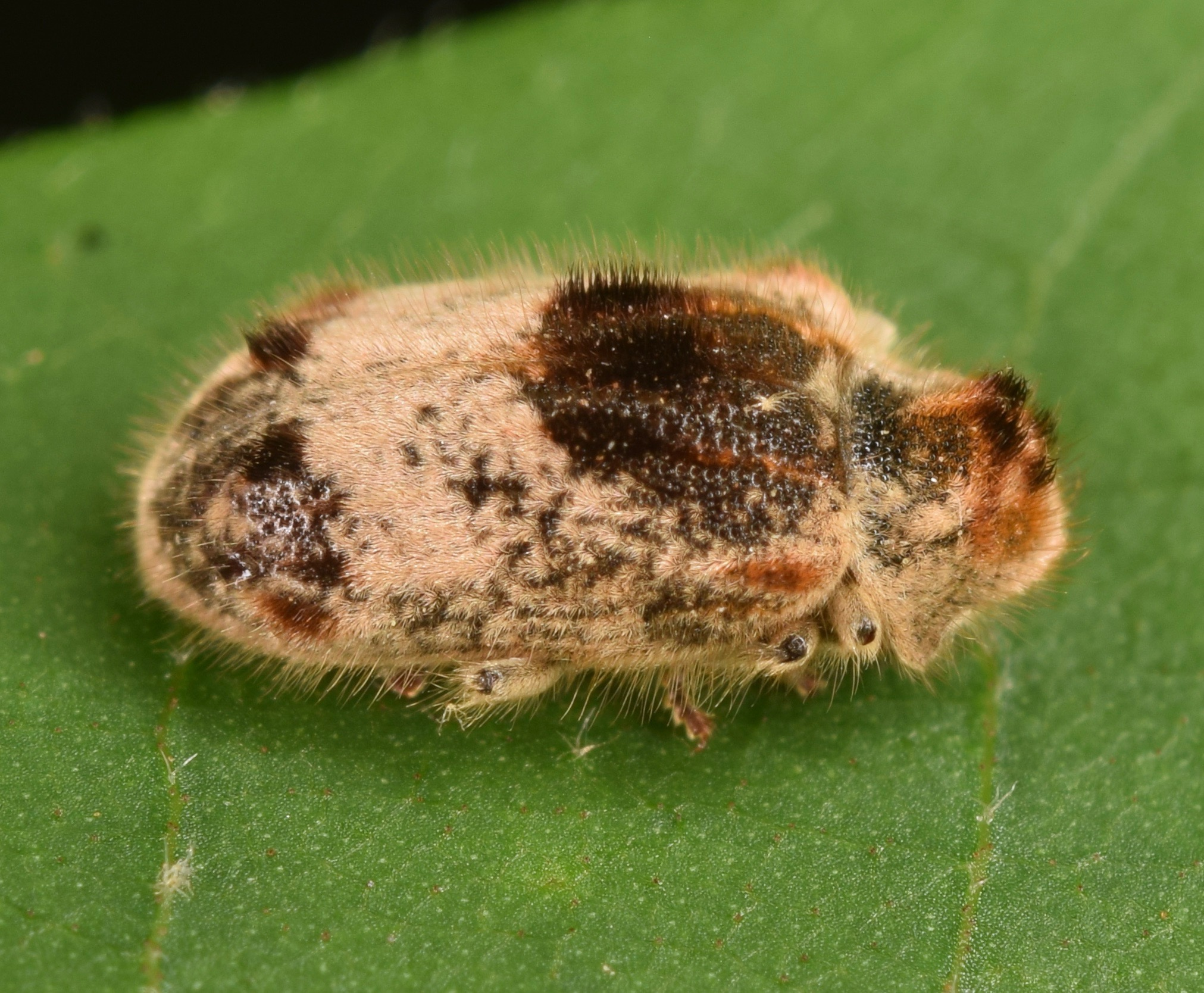

Scientific classification
- Kingdom: Animalia
- Phylum: Arthropoda
- Class: Insecta
- Order: Coleoptera
- Suborder: Polyphaga
- Family: Ptinidae
- Genus: Trichodesma
- Species: T. gibbosa

Binomial name
- Trichodesma gibbosa (Say, 1825)

= Trichodesma gibbosa =

Species of beetle

Trichodesma gibbosa, or the gibbous death-watch beetle is a species of death-watch beetle in the family Ptinidae. It is found in North America.
