= Epidesma aurimacula =

Scientific classification
- Domain: Eukaryota
- Kingdom: Animalia
- Phylum: Arthropoda
- Class: Insecta
- Order: Lepidoptera
- Superfamily: Noctuoidea
- Family: Erebidae
- Subfamily: Arctiinae
- Genus: Epidesma
- Species: E. aurimacula

Binomial name
- Epidesma aurimacula Schaus, 1905

Synonyms
- Trichodesma aurimacula Schaus, 1905; Desmotricha aurimacula Hampson, 1914; Epidesma aurimacola Auctt.

Species of moth

Epidesma aurimacula is a moth of the subfamily Arctiinae. It was described by William Schaus in 1905. It is found in Venezuela.
