= Epidesma parva =

Scientific classification
- Domain: Eukaryota
- Kingdom: Animalia
- Phylum: Arthropoda
- Class: Insecta
- Order: Lepidoptera
- Superfamily: Noctuoidea
- Family: Erebidae
- Subfamily: Arctiinae
- Genus: Epidesma
- Species: E. parva

Binomial name
- Epidesma parva (Rothschild, 1912)

Synonyms
- Trichodesma parva Rothschild, 1912

Species of moth

Epidesma parva is a moth of the subfamily Arctiinae. It was described by Rothschild in 1912. It is found in Venezuela.
