= Phaeomolis curvenal =

Scientific classification
- Domain: Eukaryota
- Kingdom: Animalia
- Phylum: Arthropoda
- Class: Insecta
- Order: Lepidoptera
- Superfamily: Noctuoidea
- Family: Erebidae
- Subfamily: Arctiinae
- Genus: Phaeomolis
- Species: P. curvenal

Binomial name
- Phaeomolis curvenal Schaus, 1933

Species of moth

Phaeomolis curvenal is a moth of the family Erebidae first described by William Schaus in 1933. It is found in Colombia.
