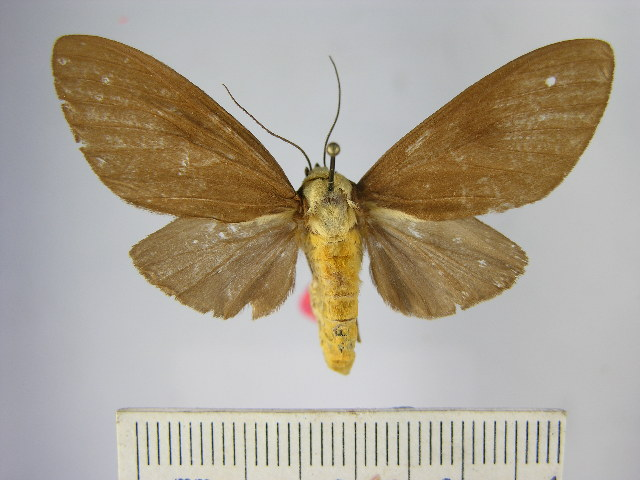
- Phaeomolis brunnescens brunnescens

Scientific classification
- Domain: Eukaryota
- Kingdom: Animalia
- Phylum: Arthropoda
- Class: Insecta
- Order: Lepidoptera
- Superfamily: Noctuoidea
- Family: Erebidae
- Subfamily: Arctiinae
- Genus: Phaeomolis
- Species: P. brunnescens

Binomial name
- Phaeomolis brunnescens (Rothschild, 1909)

Synonyms
- Automolis brunnescens Rothschild, 1909; Automolis brunnescens unicolor Rothschild, 1909

= Phaeomolis brunnescens =

Species of moth

Phaeomolis brunnescens is a moth of the family Erebidae first described by Walter Rothschild in 1909. It is found in Panama, Brazil and Bolivia.

== Subspecies ==
- Phaeomolis brunnescens brunnescens (Brazil)
- Phaeomolis brunnescens unicolor (Rothschild, 1909) (Bolivia)
