= Phaeomolis ochreogaster =

Scientific classification
- Domain: Eukaryota
- Kingdom: Animalia
- Phylum: Arthropoda
- Class: Insecta
- Order: Lepidoptera
- Superfamily: Noctuoidea
- Family: Erebidae
- Subfamily: Arctiinae
- Genus: Phaeomolis
- Species: P. ochreogaster

Binomial name
- Phaeomolis ochreogaster (Joicey & Talbot, 1918)

Synonyms
- Automolis ochreogaster Joicey & Talbot, 1918

Species of moth

Phaeomolis ochreogaster is a moth of the family Erebidae first described by James John Joicey and George Talbot in 1918. It is found in Paraguay.
