= Phaeomolis obnubila =

Scientific classification
- Domain: Eukaryota
- Kingdom: Animalia
- Phylum: Arthropoda
- Class: Insecta
- Order: Lepidoptera
- Superfamily: Noctuoidea
- Family: Erebidae
- Subfamily: Arctiinae
- Genus: Phaeomolis
- Species: P. obnubila

Binomial name
- Phaeomolis obnubila Dognin, 1923

Species of moth

Phaeomolis obnubila is a moth of the family Erebidae first described by Paul Dognin in 1923. It is found in Brazil.
