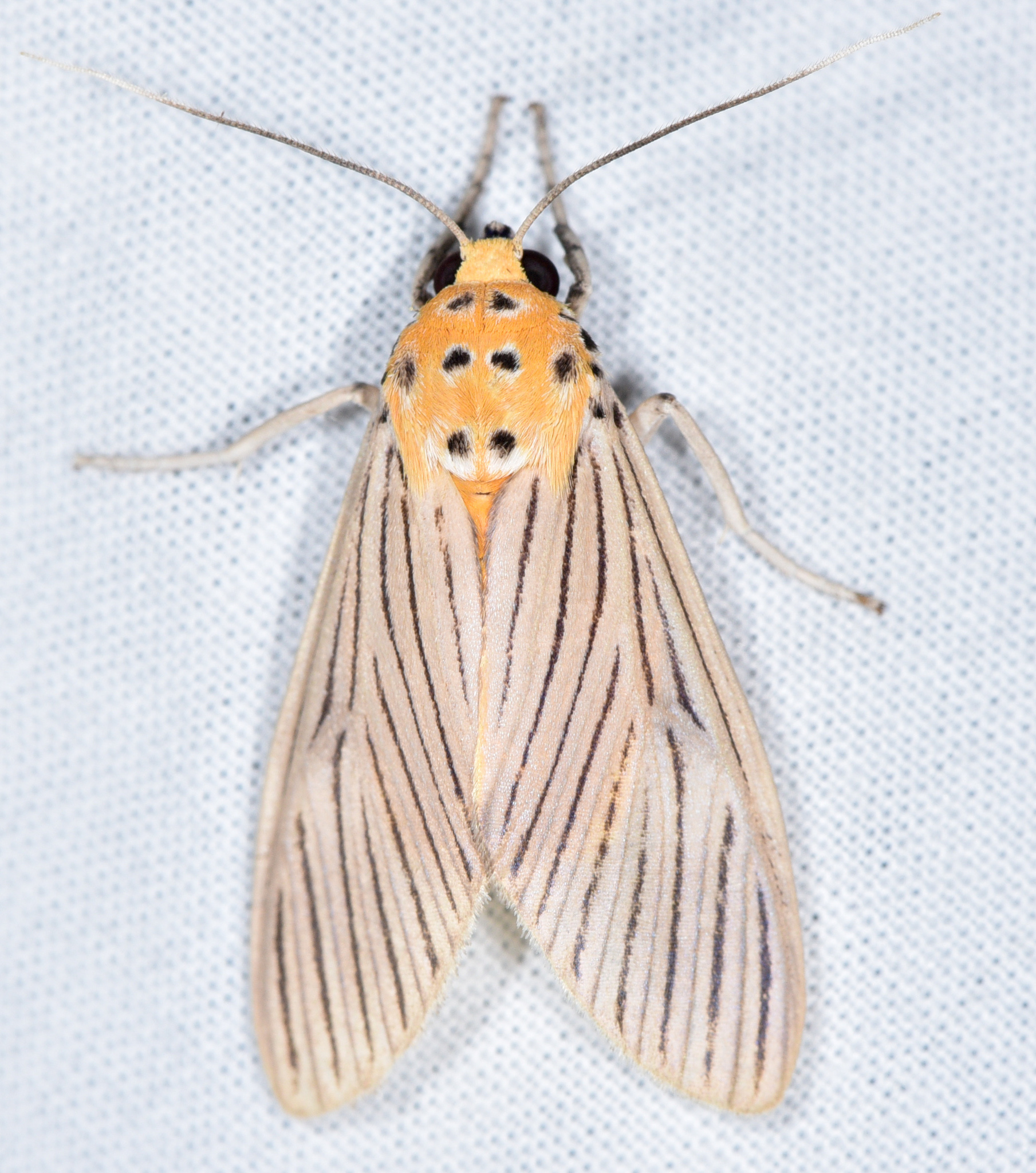
- Phaeomolis lineatus

Scientific classification
- Domain: Eukaryota
- Kingdom: Animalia
- Phylum: Arthropoda
- Class: Insecta
- Order: Lepidoptera
- Superfamily: Noctuoidea
- Family: Erebidae
- Subfamily: Arctiinae
- Genus: Phaeomolis
- Species: P. lineatus

Binomial name
- Phaeomolis lineatus (H. Druce, 1884)

Synonyms
- Evius lineatus H. Druce, 1884; Idalus lineata; Idalus lineatus

= Phaeomolis lineatus =

Species of moth

Phaeomolis lineatus is a moth of the family Erebidae. It was first described by Herbert Druce in 1884. It measures 31-36mm in length. It is found across Central and North America in Panama, Costa Rica, Honduras, Belize, Nicaragua, and Mexico.
