= Epidesma oceola =

Scientific classification
- Kingdom: Animalia
- Phylum: Arthropoda
- Class: Insecta
- Order: Lepidoptera
- Superfamily: Noctuoidea
- Family: Erebidae
- Subfamily: Arctiinae
- Genus: Epidesma
- Species: E. oceola

Binomial name
- Epidesma oceola (Dyar, 1910)

Synonyms
- Trichodesma oceola Dyar, 1910

Species of moth

Epidesma oceola is a moth of the subfamily Arctiinae. It was described by Harrison Gray Dyar Jr. in 1910. It is found in Mexico and Venezuela.
