= Phaeomolis bertrandi =

Scientific classification
- Kingdom: Animalia
- Phylum: Arthropoda
- Class: Insecta
- Order: Lepidoptera
- Superfamily: Noctuoidea
- Family: Erebidae
- Subfamily: Arctiinae
- Genus: Phaeomolis
- Species: P. bertrandi

Binomial name
- Phaeomolis bertrandi Toulgoët, 1982

Species of moth

Phaeomolis bertrandi is a moth of the family Erebidae first described by Hervé de Toulgoët in 1982. It is found in Brazil.
