= Trichodesma cristata =

Scientific classification
- Kingdom: Animalia
- Phylum: Arthropoda
- Class: Insecta
- Order: Coleoptera
- Suborder: Polyphaga
- Family: Ptinidae
- Subfamily: Anobiinae
- Genus: Trichodesma
- Species: T. cristata

Binomial name
- Trichodesma cristata (Casey, 1890)

Species of beetle

Trichodesma cristata is a species of death-watch beetle in the family Ptinidae. It is found in North America.
