= Epidesma albicincta =

Scientific classification
- Kingdom: Animalia
- Phylum: Arthropoda
- Class: Insecta
- Order: Lepidoptera
- Superfamily: Noctuoidea
- Family: Erebidae
- Subfamily: Arctiinae
- Genus: Epidesma
- Species: E. albicincta

Binomial name
- Epidesma albicincta (Hampson, 1905)

Synonyms
- Trichodesma albicincta Hampson, 1905

Species of moth

Epidesma albicincta is a moth of the subfamily Arctiinae. It was described by George Hampson in 1905. It is found in Venezuela.
