= Phaeomolis polystria =

Scientific classification
- Domain: Eukaryota
- Kingdom: Animalia
- Phylum: Arthropoda
- Class: Insecta
- Order: Lepidoptera
- Superfamily: Noctuoidea
- Family: Erebidae
- Subfamily: Arctiinae
- Genus: Phaeomolis
- Species: P. polystria

Binomial name
- Phaeomolis polystria (Schaus, 1905)

Synonyms
- Automolis polystria Schaus, 1905

Species of moth

Phaeomolis polystria is a moth of the family Erebidae first described by William Schaus in 1905. It is found in French Guiana and Brazil.
