= Trichodesma pulchella =

Scientific classification
- Kingdom: Animalia
- Phylum: Arthropoda
- Class: Insecta
- Order: Coleoptera
- Suborder: Polyphaga
- Family: Ptinidae
- Genus: Trichodesma
- Species: T. pulchella

Binomial name
- Trichodesma pulchella Schaeffer, 1903

Species of beetle

Trichodesma pulchella is a species of death-watch beetle in the family Ptinidae. It is found in North America.
