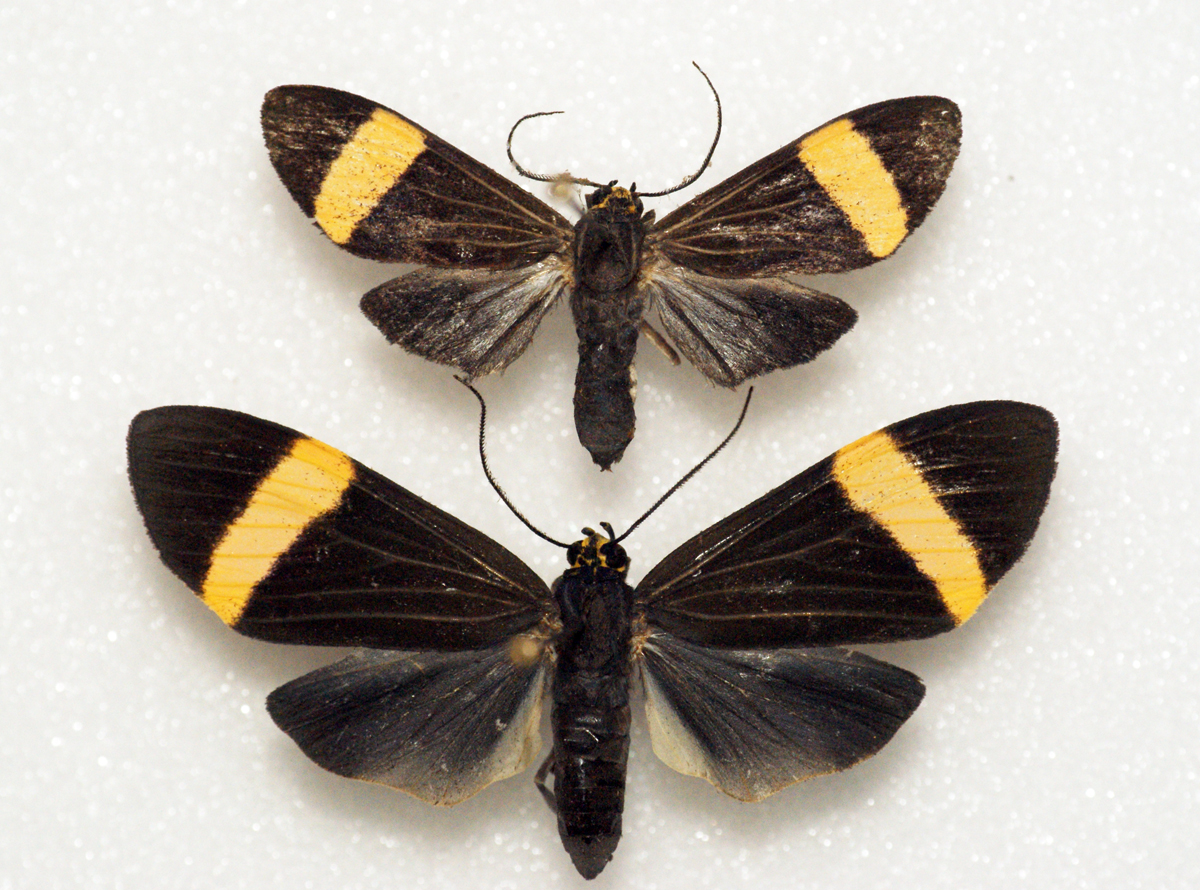

Scientific classification
- Domain: Eukaryota
- Kingdom: Animalia
- Phylum: Arthropoda
- Class: Insecta
- Order: Lepidoptera
- Superfamily: Noctuoidea
- Family: Erebidae
- Subfamily: Arctiinae
- Genus: Epidesma
- Species: E. metapolia

Binomial name
- Epidesma metapolia (Dognin, 1912)

Synonyms
- Desmotricha metapolia Dognin, 1912

= Epidesma metapolia =

Species of moth

Epidesma metapolia is a moth of the subfamily Arctiinae. It was described by Paul Dognin in 1912. It is found in Colombia and Peru.
