= Phaeomolis tavakiliani =

Scientific classification
- Kingdom: Animalia
- Phylum: Arthropoda
- Class: Insecta
- Order: Lepidoptera
- Superfamily: Noctuoidea
- Family: Erebidae
- Subfamily: Arctiinae
- Genus: Phaeomolis
- Species: P. tavakiliani

Binomial name
- Phaeomolis tavakiliani Toulgoët, 1987

Species of moth

Phaeomolis tavakiliani is a moth of the family Erebidae first described by Hervé de Toulgoët in 1987. It is found in French Guiana.
