= Epidesma trita =

Scientific classification
- Domain: Eukaryota
- Kingdom: Animalia
- Phylum: Arthropoda
- Class: Insecta
- Order: Lepidoptera
- Superfamily: Noctuoidea
- Family: Erebidae
- Subfamily: Arctiinae
- Genus: Epidesma
- Species: E. trita

Binomial name
- Epidesma trita (Dognin, 1911)

Synonyms
- Trichodesma trita Dognin, 1911

Species of moth

Epidesma trita is a moth of the subfamily Arctiinae. It was described by Paul Dognin in 1911. It is found in Colombia and Ecuador.
