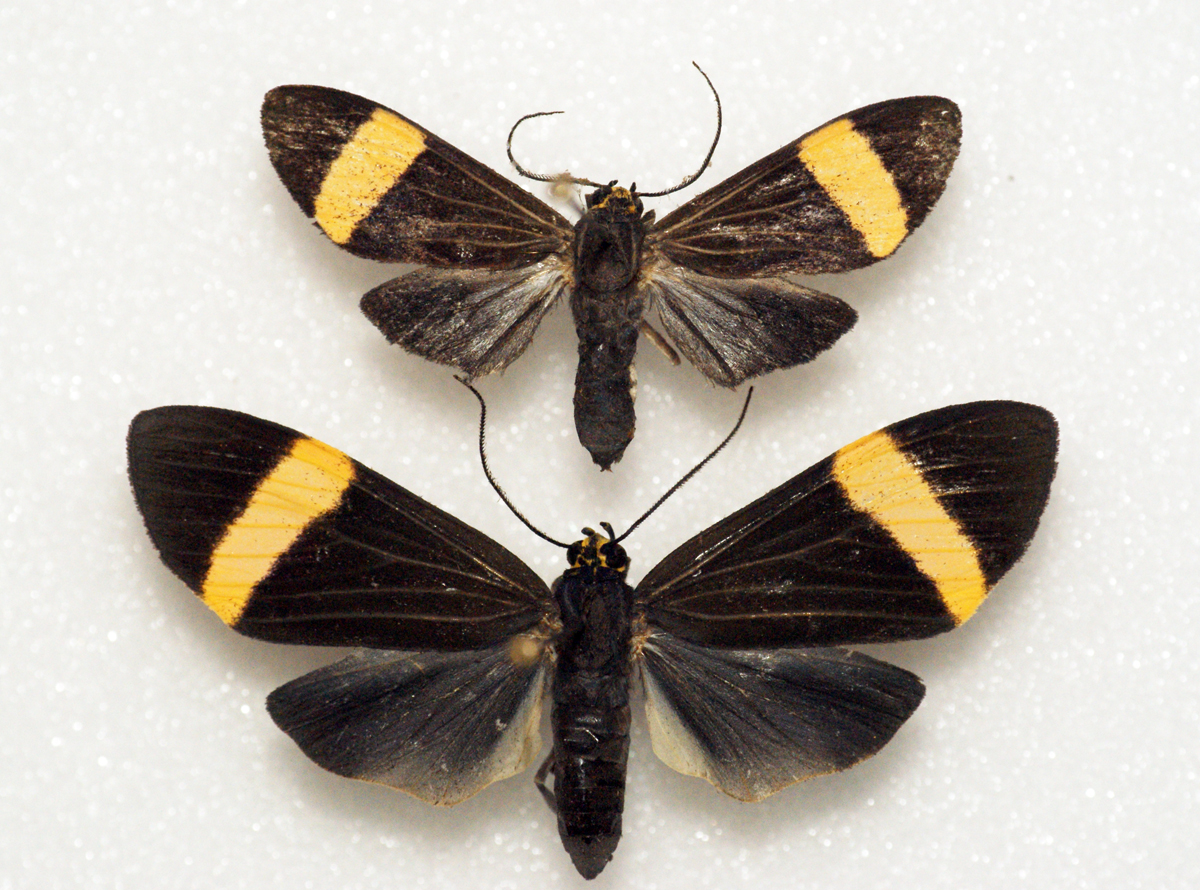
- Epidesma metapolia

Scientific classification
- Kingdom: Animalia
- Phylum: Arthropoda
- Clade: Pancrustacea
- Class: Insecta
- Order: Lepidoptera
- Superfamily: Noctuoidea
- Family: Erebidae
- Subfamily: Arctiinae
- Subtribe: Euchromiina
- Genus: Epidesma; Hübner, [1819]

Synonyms
- Trichodesma Hampson, 1898; Desmotricha Hampson, 1911

= Epidesma =

Genus of moths

Epidesma is a genus of moths in the subfamily Arctiinae. The genus was erected by Jacob Hübner in 1819.

== Species ==
- Epidesma albicincta (Hampson, 1905)
- Epidesma aurimacula (Schaus, 1905)
- Epidesma crameri (Travassos, 1938)
- Epidesma hoffmannsi (Rothschild, 1912)
- Epidesma imitata (Druce, 1883)
- Epidesma josioides (Zerny, 1931)
- Epidesma klagesi (Rothschild, 1912)
- Epidesma metapolia (Dognin, 1912)
- Epidesma obliqua (Schaus, 1898)
- Epidesma oceola (Dyar, 1910)
- Epidesma parva (Rothschild, 1912)
- Epidesma perplexa (Rothschild, 1912)
- Epidesma similis (Rothschild, 1912)
- Epidesma trita (Dognin, 1911)
- Epidesma ursula (Stoll, [1781])
