= Epidesma similis =

Scientific classification
- Domain: Eukaryota
- Kingdom: Animalia
- Phylum: Arthropoda
- Class: Insecta
- Order: Lepidoptera
- Superfamily: Noctuoidea
- Family: Erebidae
- Subfamily: Arctiinae
- Genus: Epidesma
- Species: E. similis

Binomial name
- Epidesma similis (Rothschild, 1912)

Synonyms
- Trichodesma similis Rothschild, 1912; Phaeomolis similis

Species of moth

Epidesma similis is a moth of the subfamily Arctiinae. It was described by Rothschild in 1912. It is found in Brazil.

The wingspan is 40 mm. The forewings are black-brown with a broad oblique yellow band. The hindwings are black-brown.
