= List of Tricorynus species =

Tricorynus is a genus of death-watch and spider beetles in the family Ptinidae.

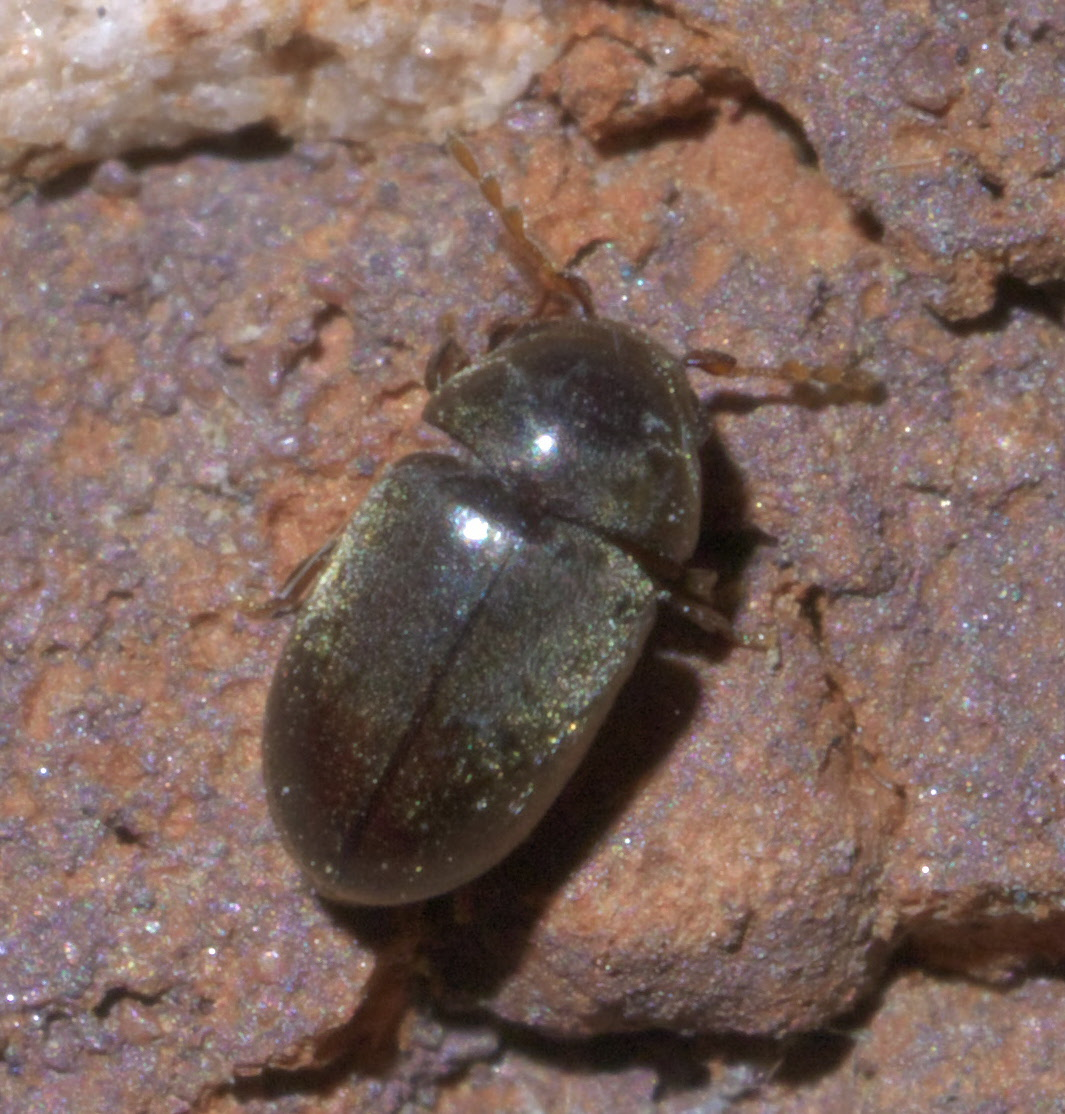

These 92 species belong to the genus Tricorynus:

- Tricorynus major (LeConte, 1878)^{i c g}
- Tricorynus abbreviatus White, 1965^{i c g}
- Tricorynus abdominalis White, 1965^{i c g}
- Tricorynus aberrans White, 1965^{i c g}
- Tricorynus abnormis White, 1965^{i c g}
- Tricorynus abruptus (Fall, 1905)^{i c g}
- Tricorynus angustus White, 1965^{i c g}
- Tricorynus arizonicus (LeConte, 1878)^{i c g}
- Tricorynus auctus White, 1965^{i c g b}
- Tricorynus bifoveatus (LeConte, 1865)^{i c g}
- Tricorynus borealis White, 1965^{i c g}
- Tricorynus californicus (Fall, 1905)^{i c g}
- Tricorynus carinatus (Hamilton, 1893)^{i c g}
- Tricorynus castaneus (Fall, 1905)^{i c g}
- Tricorynus cicatricosus White, 1965^{i c g}
- Tricorynus coactus (Fall, 1905)^{i c g}
- Tricorynus confusus (Fall, 1905)^{i c g b}
- Tricorynus congruus (Fall, 1905)^{i c g}
- Tricorynus conjunctus (Fall, 1905)^{i c g}
- Tricorynus conophilus (Fall, 1905)^{i c g}
- Tricorynus consobrinus Ford, 1998^{i c g}
- Tricorynus cryptoglyptus (LeConte, 1878)^{i c}
- Tricorynus debilis (Fall, 1905)^{i c g}
- Tricorynus densus (Fall, 1905)^{i c g b}
- Tricorynus dichrous (Fall, 1905)^{i c g}
- Tricorynus dispar White, 1981^{i c g}
- Tricorynus dudleyae White, 1965^{i c g}
- Tricorynus elutus (Horn, 1894)^{i c g b}
- Tricorynus estriatus (Fall, 1905)^{i c g}
- Tricorynus exiguus White, 1965^{i c g}
- Tricorynus extremus (Pic, 1905)^{i c}
- Tricorynus falli (Fall, 1905)^{i c g b}
- Tricorynus fastigiatus (Pic, 1912)^{i c g}
- Tricorynus floridanus (Fall, 1905)^{i c g}
- Tricorynus gibbulus Pic, 1905^{g}
- Tricorynus goyasensis (Fall, 1905)^{i c g}
- Tricorynus gracilis (LeConte, 1858)^{i c g b}
- Tricorynus gravis White, 1965^{i c g}
- Tricorynus guttiformis (Gorham, 1883)^{i c g}
- Tricorynus herbarius White, 1965^{i c g}
- Tricorynus imitans (Fall, 1905)^{i c g}
- Tricorynus inaequalis (Fall, 1905)^{i c g}
- Tricorynus indistinctus White, 1965^{i c g}
- Tricorynus inflatus White, 1965^{i c g}
- Tricorynus lanceolatus (Horn, 1894)^{i c g}
- Tricorynus latus (Fall, 1905)^{i c g}
- Tricorynus lentus White, 1965^{g}
- Tricorynus lepesmei White, 1965^{i c g b}
- Tricorynus lucidus (Fall, 1901)^{i c g}
- Tricorynus luteotectus Pic, 1928^{g}
- Tricorynus mancus (Fall, 1905)^{i c g}
- Tricorynus megalops White, 1965^{i c g}
- Tricorynus meieri (Reitter, 1897)^{g}
- Tricorynus moderatus White, 1965^{i c g}
- Tricorynus mutans (Fall, 1905)^{i c g}
- Tricorynus nigripennis (Fall, 1905)^{i c g}
- Tricorynus nigritulus (LeConte, 1865)^{i c g}
- Tricorynus nubilus (Fall, 1905)^{i c g}
- Tricorynus obliteratus White, 1965^{i c g}
- Tricorynus obscurus White, 1965^{i c g}
- Tricorynus obsoletus (LeConte, 1865)^{i c g}
- Tricorynus palliatus (Fall, 1901)^{i c g b}
- Tricorynus parvus (Fall, 1905)^{i c g}
- Tricorynus pierrei (Lepesme, 1947)^{g}
- Tricorynus pinguis (Fall, 1905)^{i c g}
- Tricorynus platyops White, 1965^{i c g}
- Tricorynus politus (Fall, 1905)^{i c g}
- Tricorynus porosus (Fall, 1905)^{i c g}
- Tricorynus posticus (Fall, 1905)^{i c g}
- Tricorynus productus White, 1965^{i c g}
- Tricorynus punctatus (LeConte, 1865)^{i c g b}
- Tricorynus punctulatus (LeConte, 1878)^{i c g}
- Tricorynus pusillus (LeConte, 1858)^{i c g}
- Tricorynus reiteri Pic, 1927^{g}
- Tricorynus robustus (Horn, 1894)^{i c g}
- Tricorynus rotundus (White, 1960)^{i c g}
- Tricorynus sallei (Guérin-Méneville, 1851)^{g}
- Tricorynus sharpi (Pic, 1912)^{i c g}
- Tricorynus similis (LeConte, 1878)^{i c g b}
- Tricorynus tabaci (Guérin-Méneville, 1850)^{i c g}
- Tricorynus texanus White, 1965^{i c g b}
- Tricorynus tibialis White, 1965^{i c g}
- Tricorynus tropicus White, 1965^{i c g}
- Tricorynus tumidus (Fall, 1905)^{i c g}
- Tricorynus turbidus (Fall, 1905)^{i c g}
- Tricorynus uniformis (Fall, 1905)^{i c g}
- Tricorynus vacuus (Fall, 1905)^{i c g}
- Tricorynus validus (Fall, 1905)^{i c g}
- Tricorynus ventralis (LeConte, 1865)^{i c g}
- Tricorynus vestitus (Fall, 1905)^{i c g}
- Tricorynus vitiosus (Fall, 1905)^{i c g}
- Tricorynus vittatus White, 1965^{i c g}

Data sources: i = ITIS, c = Catalogue of Life, g = GBIF, b = Bugguide.net
