= Tricorynus estriatus =

Scientific classification
- Kingdom: Animalia
- Phylum: Arthropoda
- Clade: Pancrustacea
- Class: Insecta
- Order: Coleoptera
- Suborder: Polyphaga
- Family: Ptinidae
- Subfamily: Mesocoelopodinae
- Genus: Tricorynus
- Species: T. estriatus

Binomial name
- Tricorynus estriatus (Horn, 1894)

Synonyms
- Tricorynus grandis (Fall, 1905)

Species of beetle

Tricorynus estriatus is a species of beetle in the family Ptinidae. It is found in Central America and North America.
