= Tricorynus palliatus =

Scientific classification
- Kingdom: Animalia
- Phylum: Arthropoda
- Clade: Pancrustacea
- Class: Insecta
- Order: Coleoptera
- Suborder: Polyphaga
- Family: Ptinidae
- Subfamily: Mesocoelopodinae
- Genus: Tricorynus
- Species: T. palliatus

Binomial name
- Tricorynus palliatus (Fall, 1901)

Species of beetle

Tricorynus palliatus is a species of beetle in the family Ptinidae. It is found in North America.
