= Tricorynus texanus =

Scientific classification
- Kingdom: Animalia
- Phylum: Arthropoda
- Clade: Pancrustacea
- Class: Insecta
- Order: Coleoptera
- Suborder: Polyphaga
- Family: Ptinidae
- Subfamily: Mesocoelopodinae
- Genus: Tricorynus
- Species: T. texanus

Binomial name
- Tricorynus texanus White, 1965

Species of beetle

Tricorynus texanus is a species of beetle in the family Ptinidae. It is found in North America.
