= Tricorynus similis =

Scientific classification
- Kingdom: Animalia
- Phylum: Arthropoda
- Clade: Pancrustacea
- Class: Insecta
- Order: Coleoptera
- Suborder: Polyphaga
- Family: Ptinidae
- Subfamily: Mesocoelopodinae
- Genus: Tricorynus
- Species: T. similis

Binomial name
- Tricorynus similis (LeConte, 1878)

Synonyms
- Tricorynus vexatus (Fall, 1905)

Species of beetle

Tricorynus similis is a species of beetle in the family Ptinidae. It is found in North America.
