= Cryptorama vorticale =

Scientific classification
- Kingdom: Animalia
- Phylum: Arthropoda
- Clade: Pancrustacea
- Class: Insecta
- Order: Coleoptera
- Suborder: Polyphaga
- Family: Ptinidae
- Subfamily: Mesocoelopodinae
- Genus: Cryptorama
- Species: C. vorticale

Binomial name
- Cryptorama vorticale Fall, 1905

Species of beetle

Cryptorama vorticale is a species of beetle in the family Ptinidae. It is found in North America.

== Subspecies ==
These two subspecies belong to the species Cryptorama vorticale:

- Cryptorama vorticale minor Fall, 1905
- Cryptorama vorticale vorticale Fall, 1905
