= Tricorynus punctatus =

Scientific classification
- Kingdom: Animalia
- Phylum: Arthropoda
- Clade: Pancrustacea
- Class: Insecta
- Order: Coleoptera
- Suborder: Polyphaga
- Family: Ptinidae
- Subfamily: Mesocoelopodinae
- Genus: Tricorynus
- Species: T. punctatus

Binomial name
- Tricorynus punctatus (LeConte, 1865)

Species of beetle

Tricorynus punctatus is a species of beetle in the family Ptinidae. It is found in North America.
