= Tricorynus fastigiatus =

Scientific classification
- Kingdom: Animalia
- Phylum: Arthropoda
- Clade: Pancrustacea
- Class: Insecta
- Order: Coleoptera
- Suborder: Polyphaga
- Family: Ptinidae
- Genus: Tricorynus
- Species: T. fastigiatus

Binomial name
- Tricorynus fastigiatus (Fall, 1905)

Species of beetle

Tricorynus fastigiatus is a species of death-watch or spider beetle in the family Ptinidae. It is found in North America.
