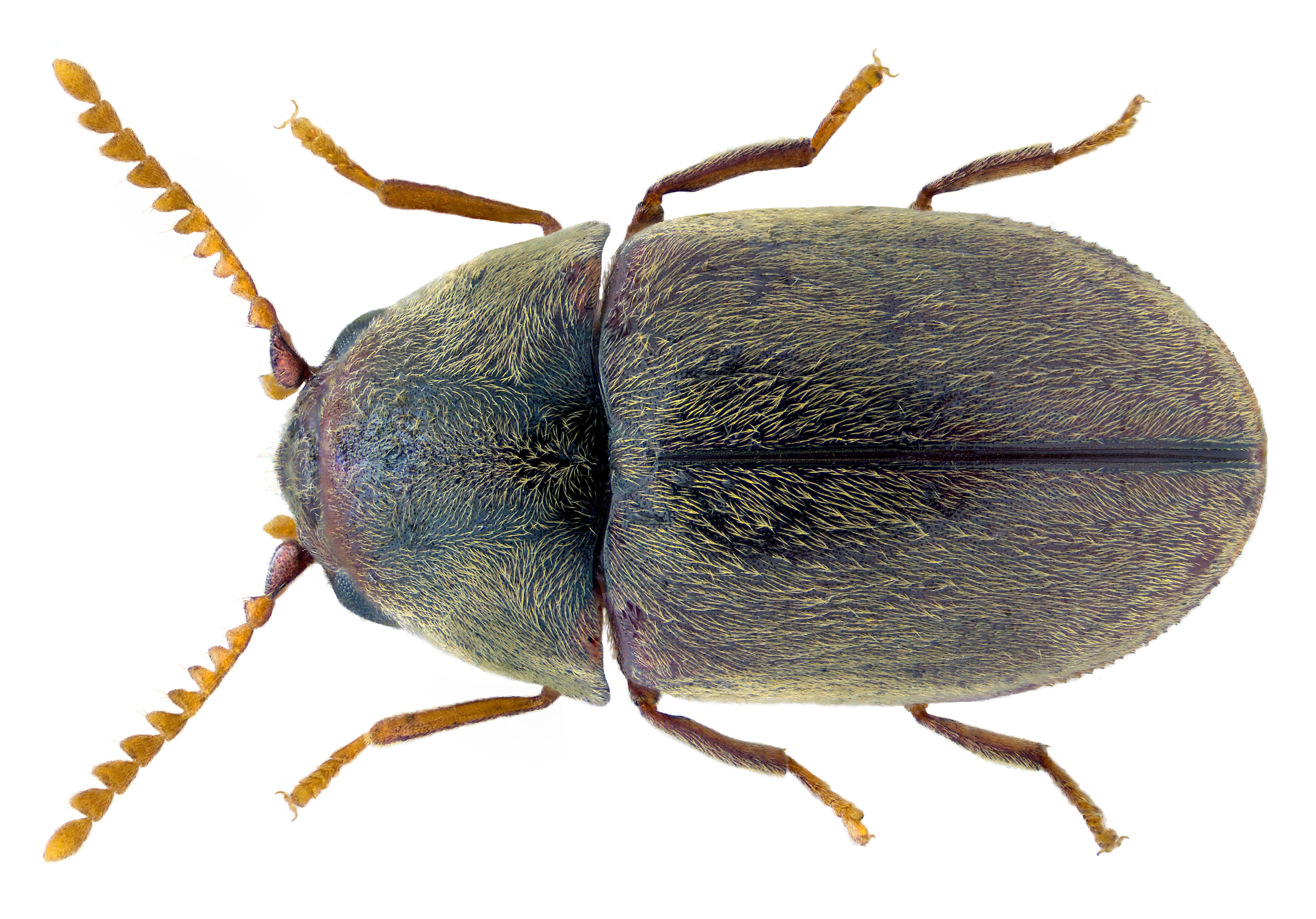

Scientific classification
- Kingdom: Animalia
- Phylum: Arthropoda
- Clade: Pancrustacea
- Class: Insecta
- Order: Coleoptera
- Suborder: Polyphaga
- Family: Ptinidae
- Genus: Mesocoelopus
- Species: M. collaris

Binomial name
- Mesocoelopus collaris Mulsant & Rey, 1864

= Mesocoelopus collaris =

Species of beetle

Mesocoelopus collaris is a species of beetle in the family Ptinidae. It is found in Africa, Europe and Northern Asia (excluding China), North America, and Southern Asia.
