= Tricorynus gravis =

Scientific classification
- Kingdom: Animalia
- Phylum: Arthropoda
- Clade: Pancrustacea
- Class: Insecta
- Order: Coleoptera
- Suborder: Polyphaga
- Family: Ptinidae
- Genus: Tricorynus
- Species: T. gravis

Binomial name
- Tricorynus gravis (LeConte, 1858)

Species of beetle

Tricorynus gravis is a species of beetle in the family Ptinidae. It is found in North America.
