= Tricorynus lucidus =

Scientific classification
- Kingdom: Animalia
- Phylum: Arthropoda
- Class: Insecta
- Order: Coleoptera
- Suborder: Polyphaga
- Family: Ptinidae
- Genus: Tricorynus
- Species: T. lucidus

Binomial name
- Tricorynus lucidus White, 1965

Species of beetle

Tricorynus lucidus is a species of beetles in the family Ptinidae. It is found in North America.
