= Tricorynus bifoveatus =

Scientific classification
- Kingdom: Animalia
- Phylum: Arthropoda
- Class: Insecta
- Order: Coleoptera
- Suborder: Polyphaga
- Family: Ptinidae
- Genus: Tricorynus
- Species: T. bifoveatus

Binomial name
- Tricorynus bifoveatus White, 1965

Species of beetle

Tricorynus bifoveatus is a species in the family Ptinidae ("death-watch and spider beetles"), in the order Coleoptera ("beetles"). It is found in North America.
