= Cryptorama =

Scientific classification
- Kingdom: Animalia
- Phylum: Arthropoda
- Clade: Pancrustacea
- Class: Insecta
- Order: Coleoptera
- Suborder: Polyphaga
- Family: Ptinidae
- Subfamily: Mesocoelopodinae
- Genus: Cryptorama; Fall, 1905

Synonyms
- Peridorcatoma Lepesme, 1947

Genus of beetles

Cryptorama is a genus of death-watch and spider beetles in the family Ptinidae. There are more than 20 described species in Cryptorama.

== Species ==
These 28 species belong to the genus Cryptorama:

- Cryptorama antillensis White, 1984
- Cryptorama carinatum White
- Cryptorama concavum White
- Cryptorama confusum White
- Cryptorama crepusculum White
- Cryptorama densipunctatum Fisher
- Cryptorama densum White
- Cryptorama dufaui (Pic, 1909)
- Cryptorama fuliginosum White
- Cryptorama griseum White
- Cryptorama grossum White
- Cryptorama guatemalensis White
- Cryptorama holosericeum (LeConte, 1878)
- Cryptorama impunctatum White
- Cryptorama lividum White
- Cryptorama megalops White
- Cryptorama minutum (LeConte, 1878)
- Cryptorama oblongum Fall, 1905
- Cryptorama panamensis White
- Cryptorama parvum White
- Cryptorama punctatum White
- Cryptorama rufescens White
- Cryptorama sericeum (Pic, 1909)
- Cryptorama sparsum White
- Cryptorama texanum White
- Cryptorama tortolensis White
- Cryptorama unistriatum White
- Cryptorama vorticale Fall, 1905
