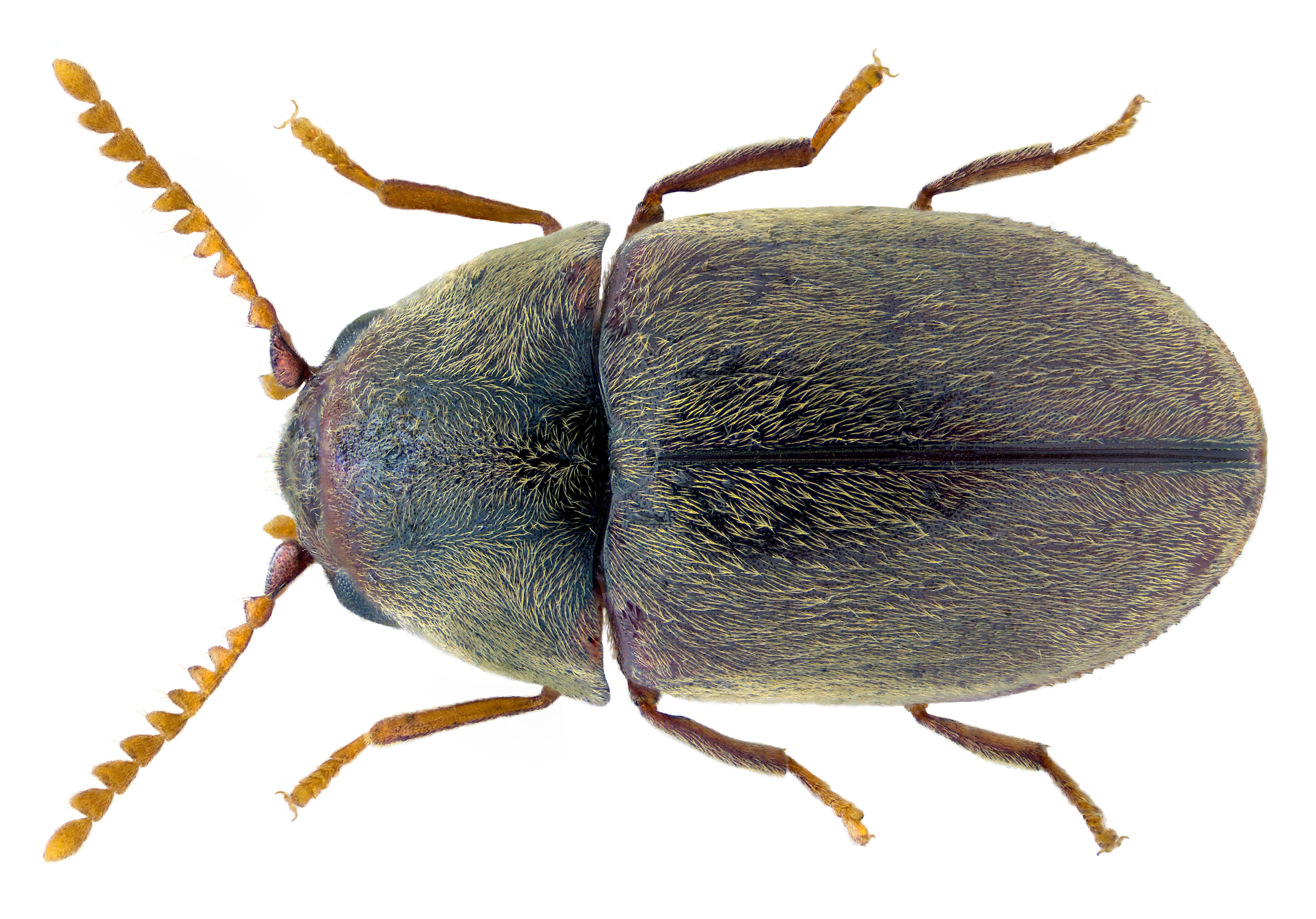
- Mesocoelopus collaris

Scientific classification
- Domain: Eukaryota
- Kingdom: Animalia
- Phylum: Arthropoda
- Class: Insecta
- Order: Coleoptera
- Suborder: Polyphaga
- Family: Ptinidae
- Subfamily: Mesocoelopodinae
- Genus: Mesocoelopus; Jacquelin du Val, 1860

= Mesocoelopus =

Genus of beetles

Mesocoelopus is a genus of death-watch and spider beetles in the family Ptinidae. There are about six described species in Mesocoelopus.

== Species ==
These six species belong to the genus Mesocoelopus:

- Mesocoelopus brevistriatus Leiler, 1979
- Mesocoelopus castelsi Pic, 1922
- Mesocoelopus collaris Mulsant & Rey, 1864
- Mesocoelopus creticus Fairmaire, 1880
- Mesocoelopus leileri Israelson, 1976
- Mesocoelopus substriatus Schilsky, 1900
