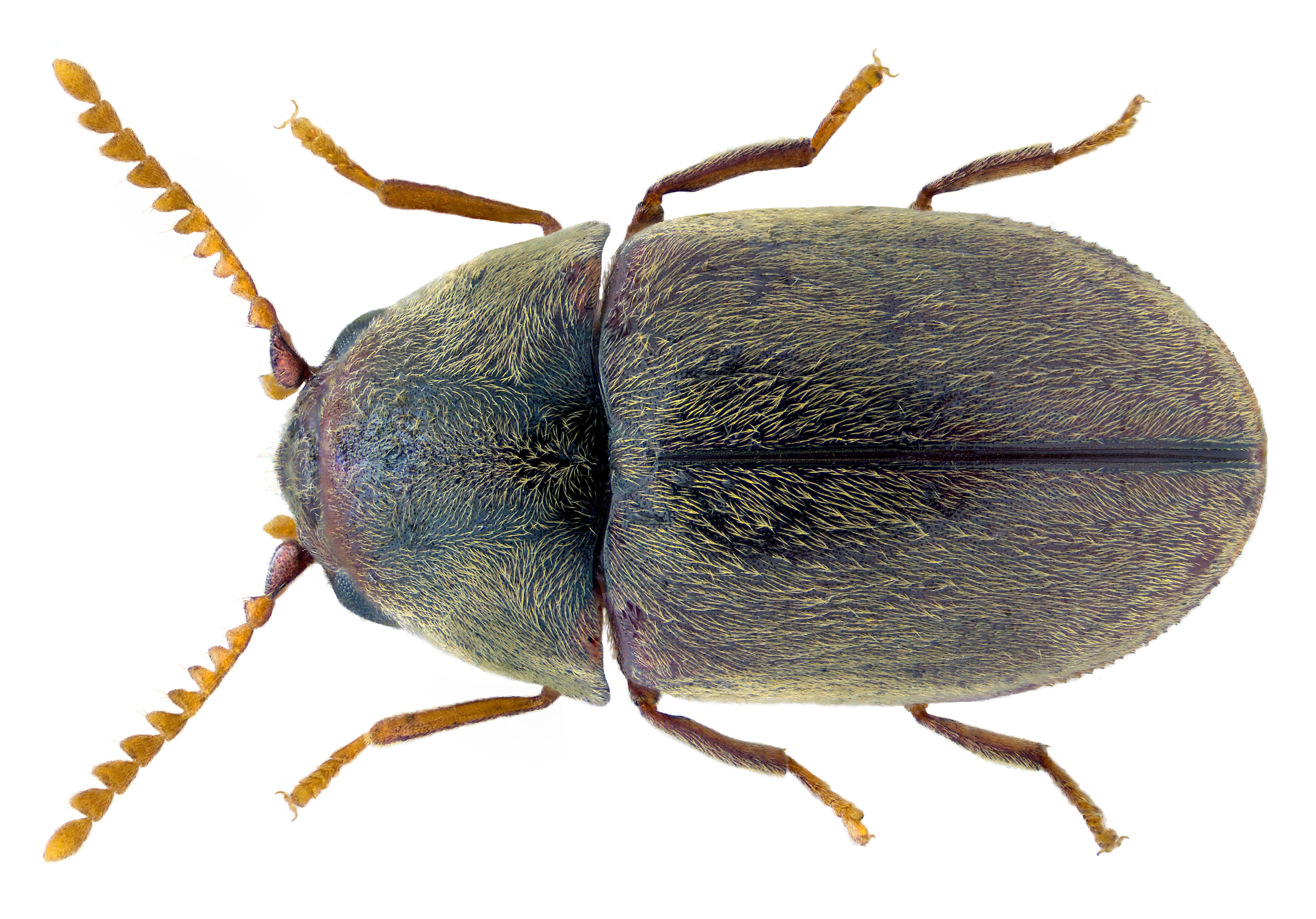
- Mesocoelopus collaris

Scientific classification
- Kingdom: Animalia
- Phylum: Arthropoda
- Class: Insecta
- Order: Coleoptera
- Suborder: Polyphaga
- Family: Ptinidae
- Subfamily: Mesocoelopodinae; Mulsant & Rey, 1864

Synonyms
- Mesothinae Portevin, 1931; Tricoryninae White, 1971

= Mesocoelopodinae =

Subfamily of beetles

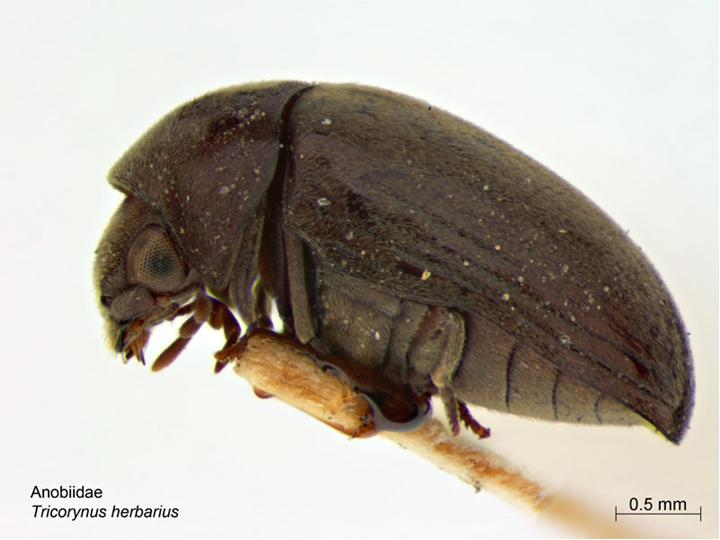
Tricorynus herbarius

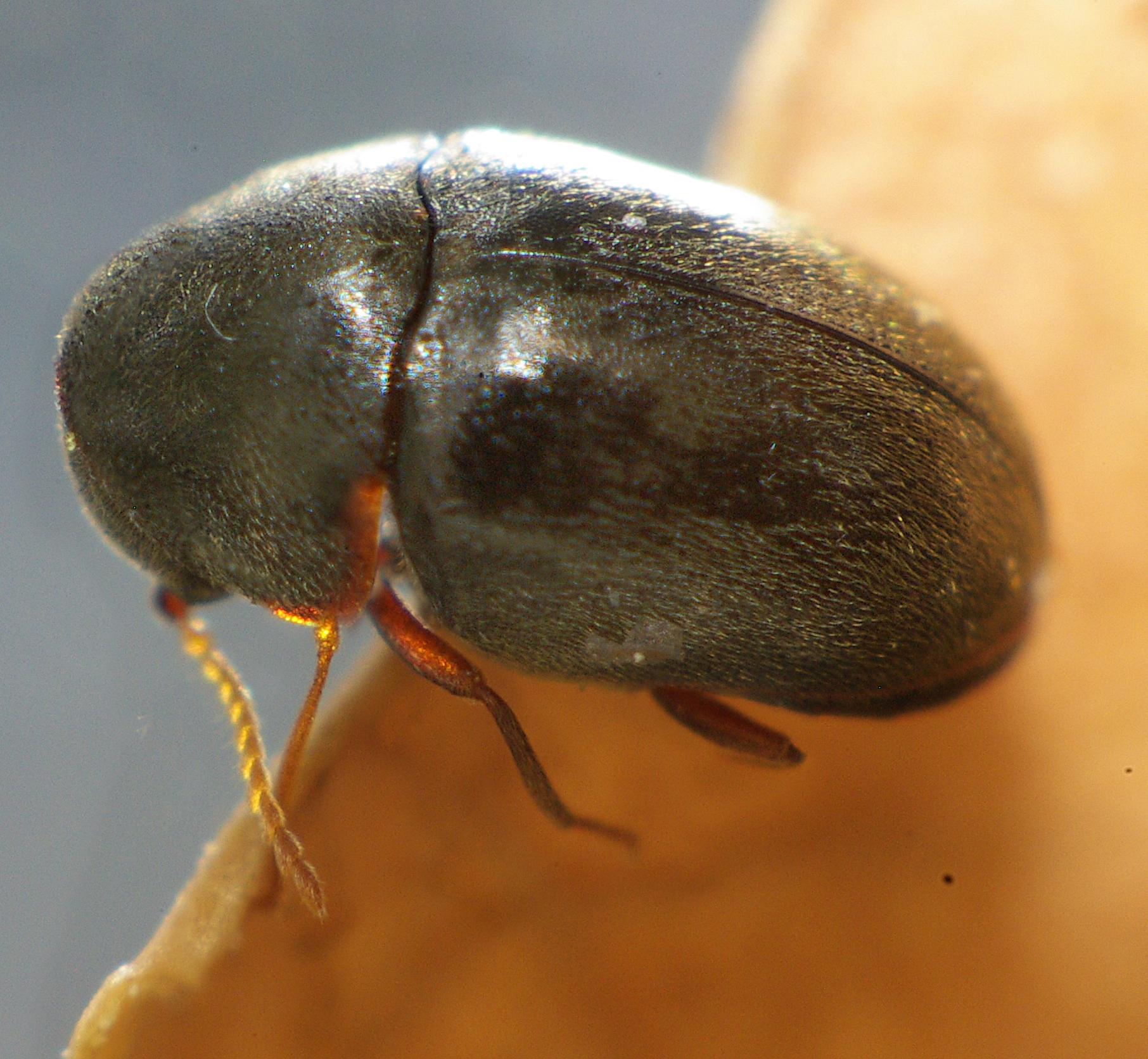
Mesocoelopus niger

Mesocoelopodinae is a subfamily of death-watch and spider beetles in the family Ptinidae. There are at least 4 genera and 100 described species in Mesocoelopodinae.

The subfamily Mesocoelopodinae, along with Anobiinae and several others, were formerly considered members of the family Anobiidae, but the family name has since been changed to Ptinidae.

== Genera ==
These four genera belong to the subfamily Mesocoelopodinae:

- Cryptorama Fall, 1905^{i c g}
- Mesocoelopus Jacquelin du Val, 1860^{i c g b}
- Neosothes White, 1967^{i g}
- Tricorynus Waterhouse, 1849^{i c g}

Data sources: i = ITIS, c = Catalogue of Life, g = GBIF, b = Bugguide.net
