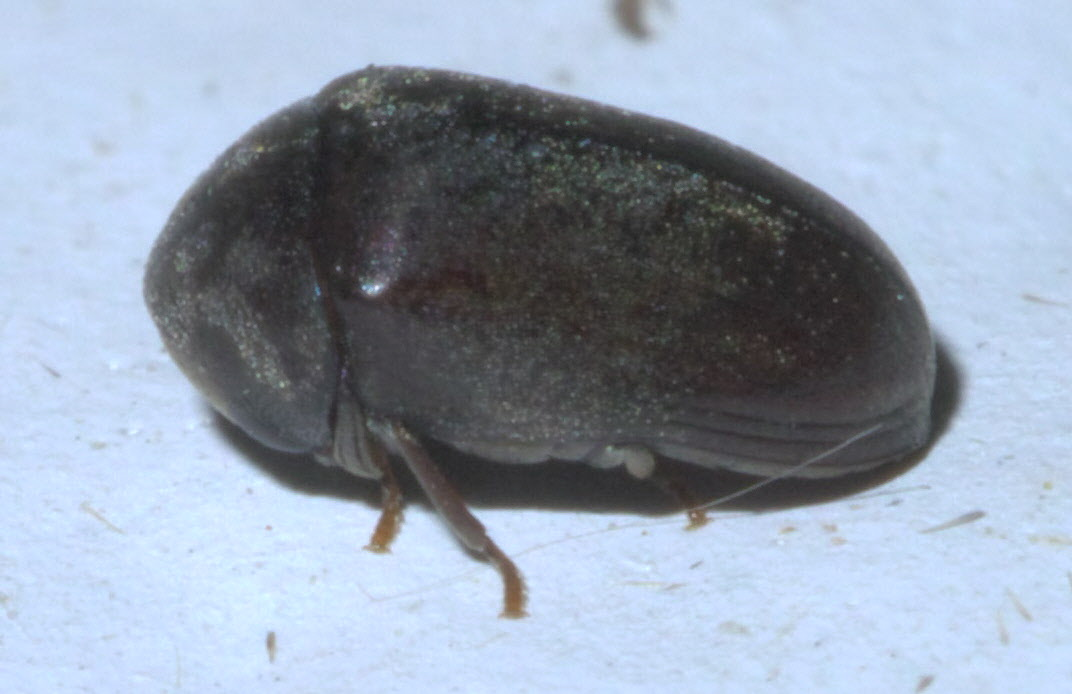

Scientific classification
- Kingdom: Animalia
- Phylum: Arthropoda
- Class: Insecta
- Order: Coleoptera
- Suborder: Polyphaga
- Family: Ptinidae
- Subfamily: Mesocoelopodinae
- Genus: Tricorynus; Waterhouse, 1849

Synonyms
- Catorama Guérin-Méneville, 1850; Hemiptychus LeConte, 1865; Xylotheca Reitter, 1897

= Tricorynus =

Genus of beetles

Tricorynus is a genus of deathwatch and spider beetles in the family Ptinidae. There are at least 90 described species in Tricorynus.

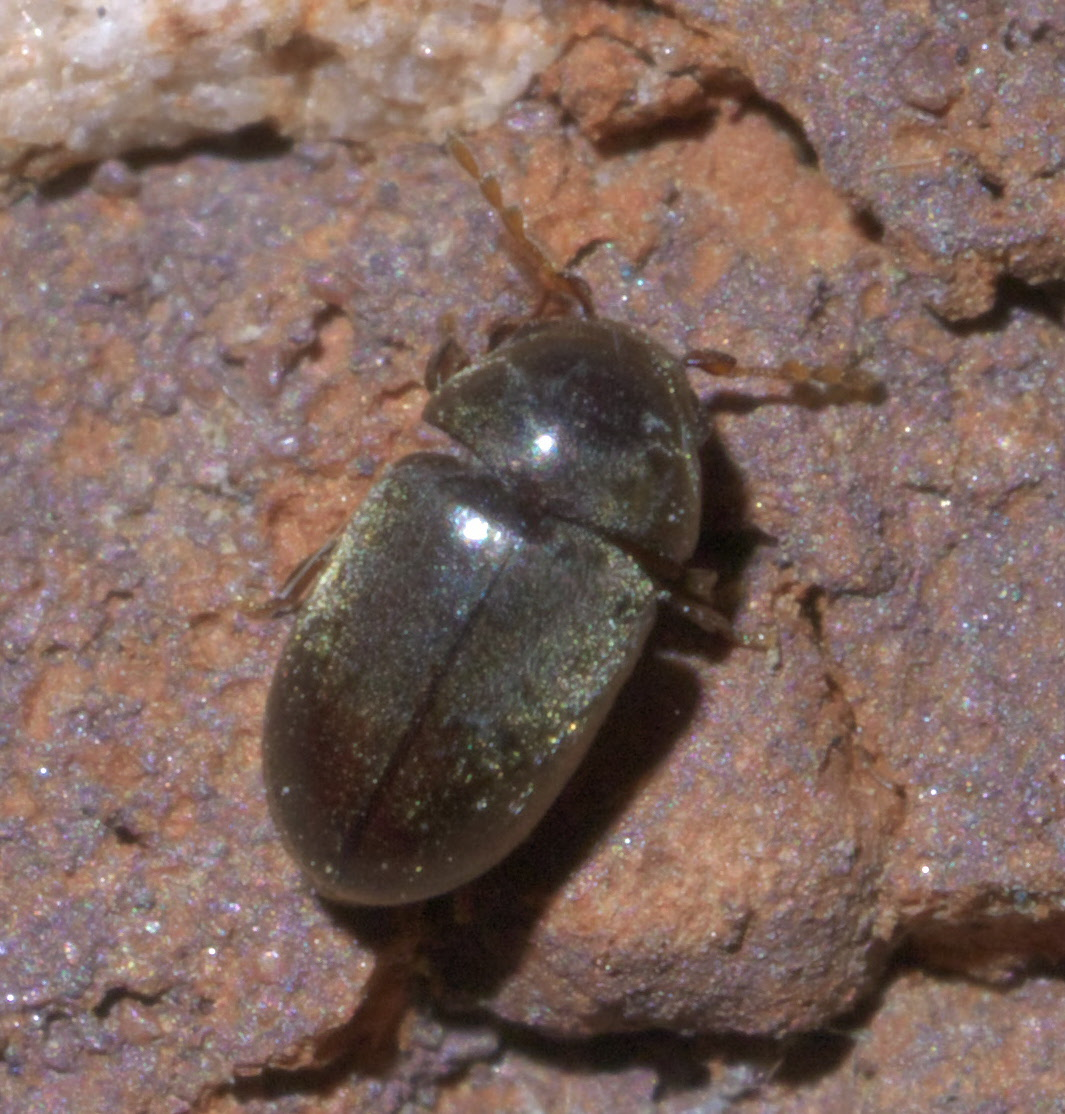

== See also ==
- List of Tricorynus species
