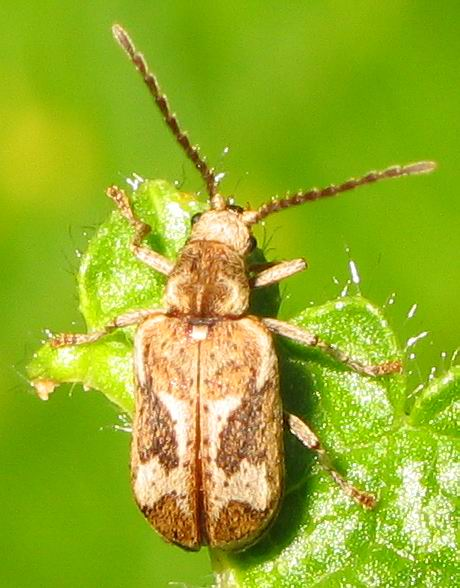

Scientific classification
- Kingdom: Animalia
- Phylum: Arthropoda
- Class: Insecta
- Order: Coleoptera
- Suborder: Polyphaga
- Superfamily: Bostrichoidea
- Family: Ptinidae
- Subfamily: Eucradinae
- Tribe: Hedobiini
- Genus: Ptinomorphus
- Species: P. imperialis

Binomial name
- Ptinomorphus imperialis (Linnaeus, 1767)

= Ptinomorphus imperialis =

Species of beetle

Ptinomorphus imperialis is a species of beetle in family Ptinidae. It is found in the Palearctic It is common in Europe in the north to Denmark and the south of Norway and Finland. In England and Ireland it is only to be found locally. P. imperialis is found in old deciduous forest where the larvae feed on dead wood. The larvae of the develop between the bark and the wood of molded damp wood from various deciduous woods such as hornbeam (Carpinus betulus), hazel (Corylus), elm (Ulmus) and linden (Tilia). The adult beetles feed on pollen and nectar of flowering shrubs, such as for example Prunus spinosa or Crataegus.

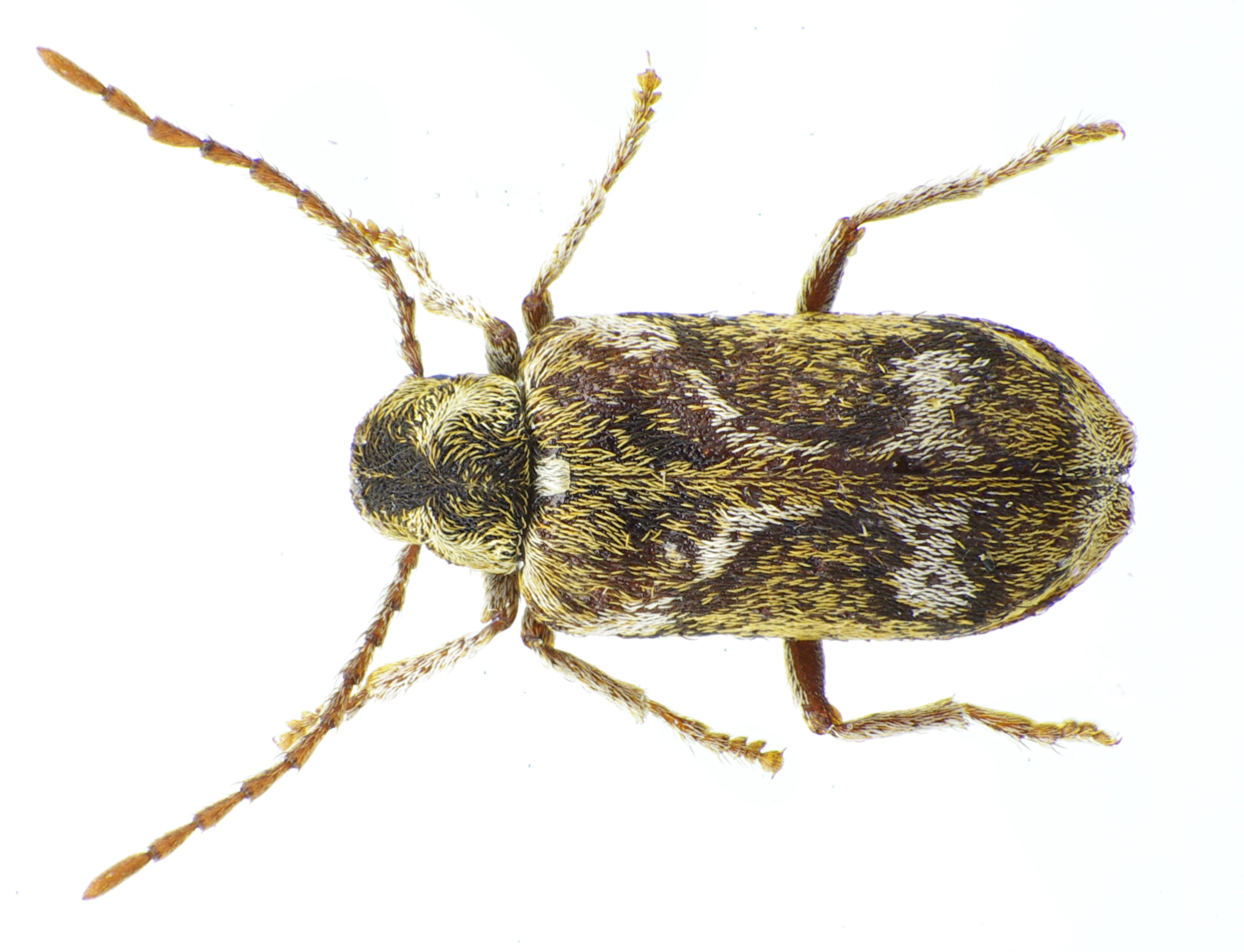

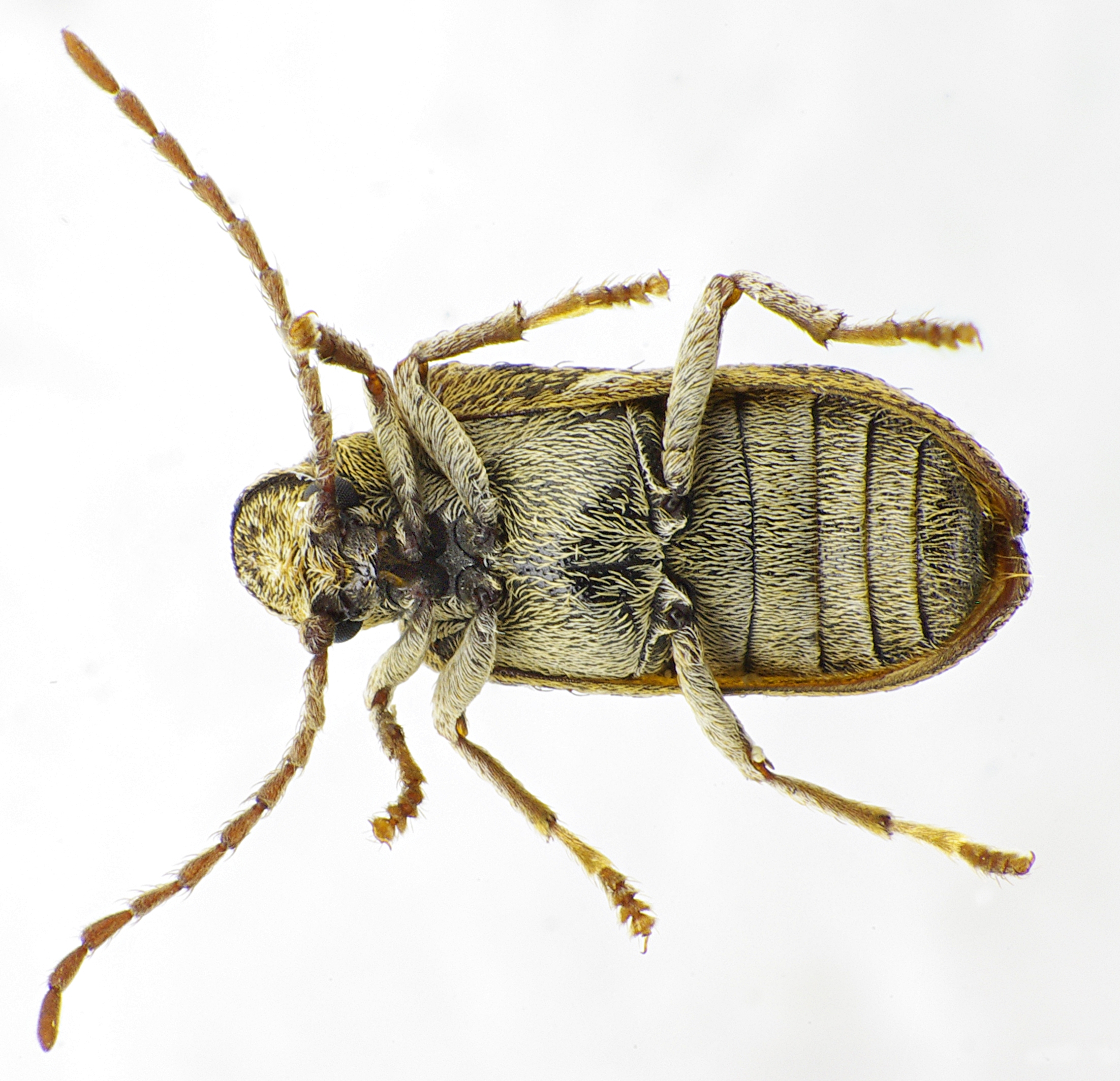

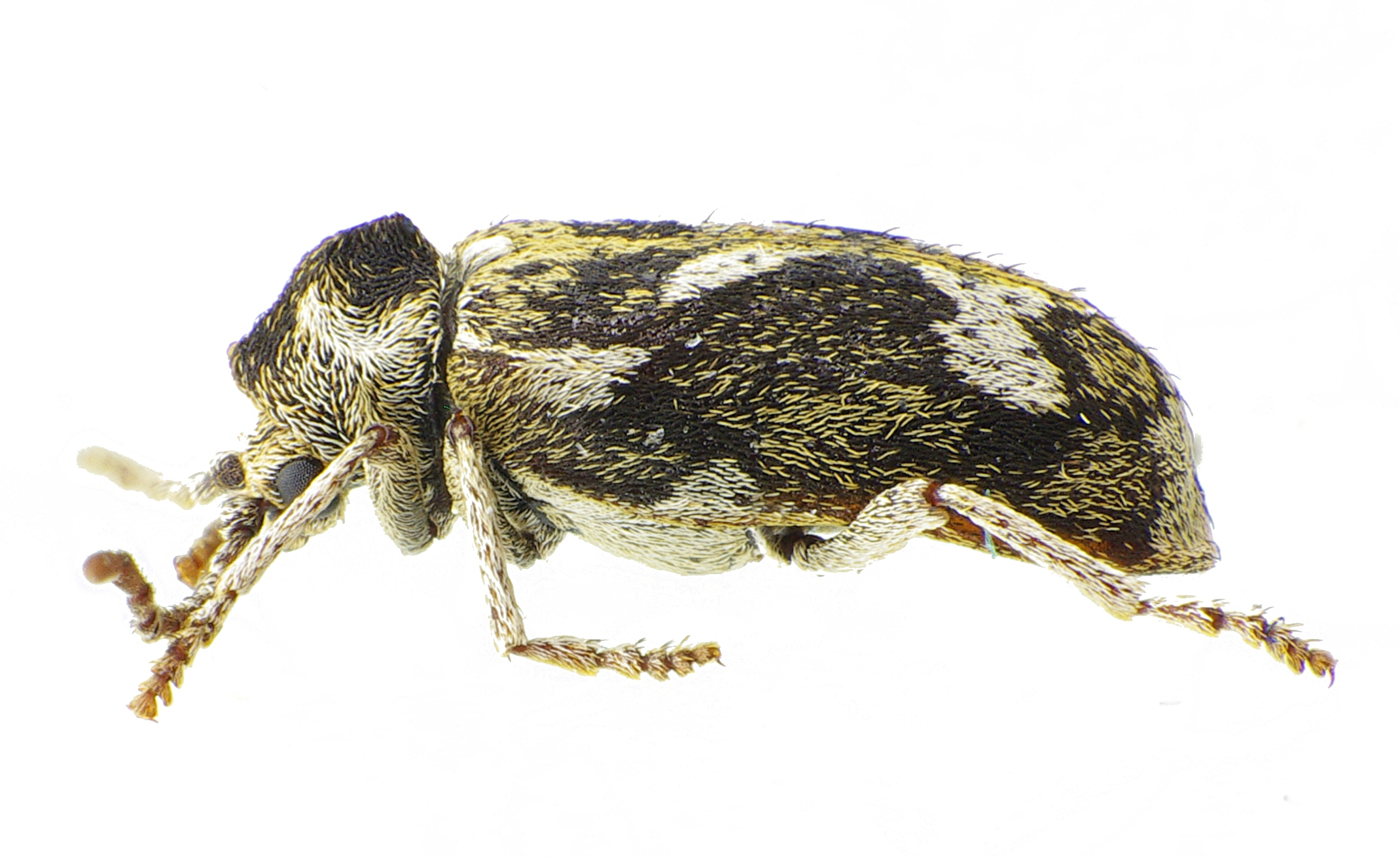

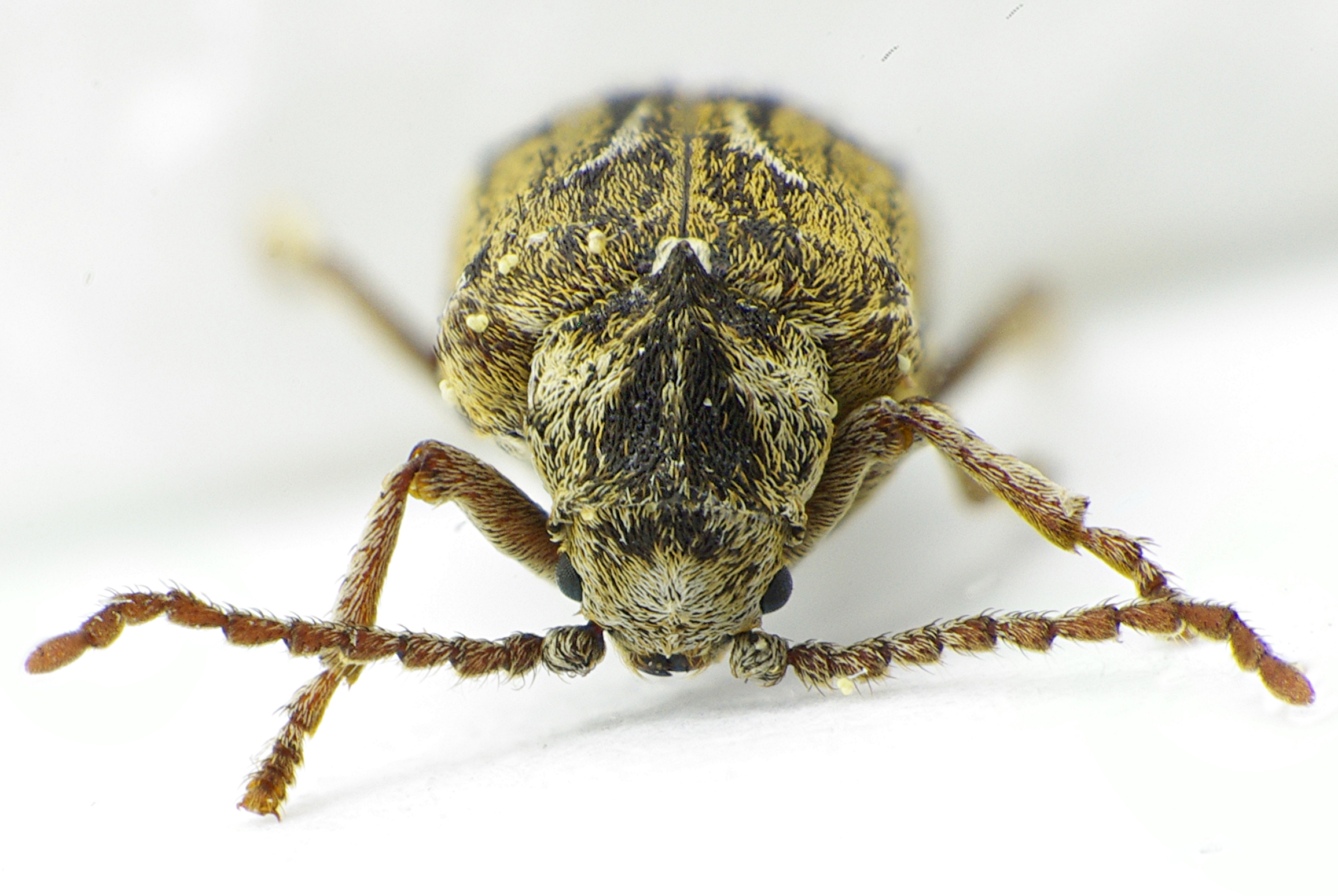
