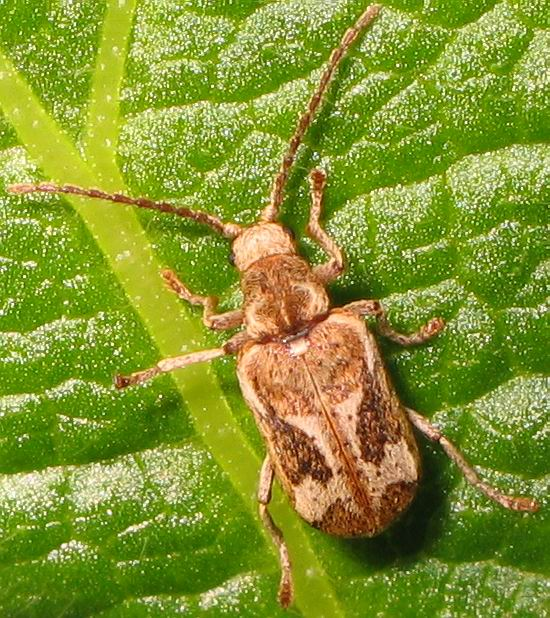
- Ptinomorphus imperialis

Scientific classification
- Kingdom: Animalia
- Phylum: Arthropoda
- Clade: Pancrustacea
- Class: Insecta
- Order: Coleoptera
- Suborder: Polyphaga
- Family: Ptinidae
- Subfamily: Eucradinae; LeConte, 1861

Synonyms
- Hedobiinae Mulsant and Rey, 1868

= Eucradinae =

Subfamily of beetles

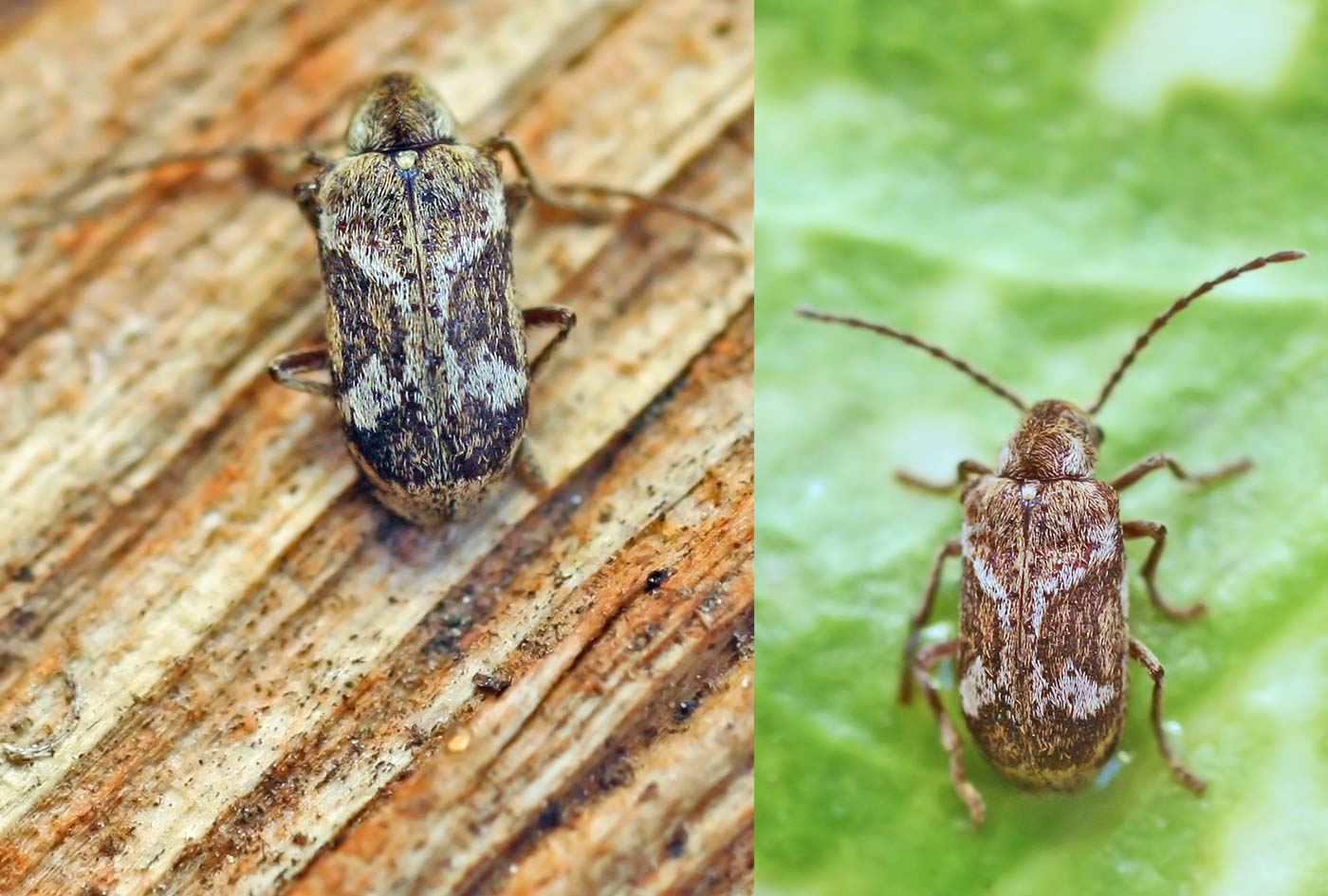
Ptinomorphus imperialis

Eucradinae is a subfamily of death-watch and spider beetles in the family Ptinidae. There are at least 5 genera and about 18 described species in Eucradinae.

The subfamily Hedobiinae, along with Anobiinae and several others, were formerly considered members of the family Anobiidae, the but family name has since been changed to Ptinidae.

== Genera ==
These five genera belong to the subfamily Eucradinae: genus Clada Pascoe, 1887

- Clada Pascoe, 1887^{g}
- Eucrada LeConte, 1861^{i c g b}
- Hedobia Dejean, 1821^{i c g}
- Neohedobia Fisher, 1919^{i c g b}
- Ptinomorphus Mulsant & Rey, 1868^{g b}

Data sources: i = ITIS, c = Catalogue of Life, g = GBIF, b = Bugguide.net
