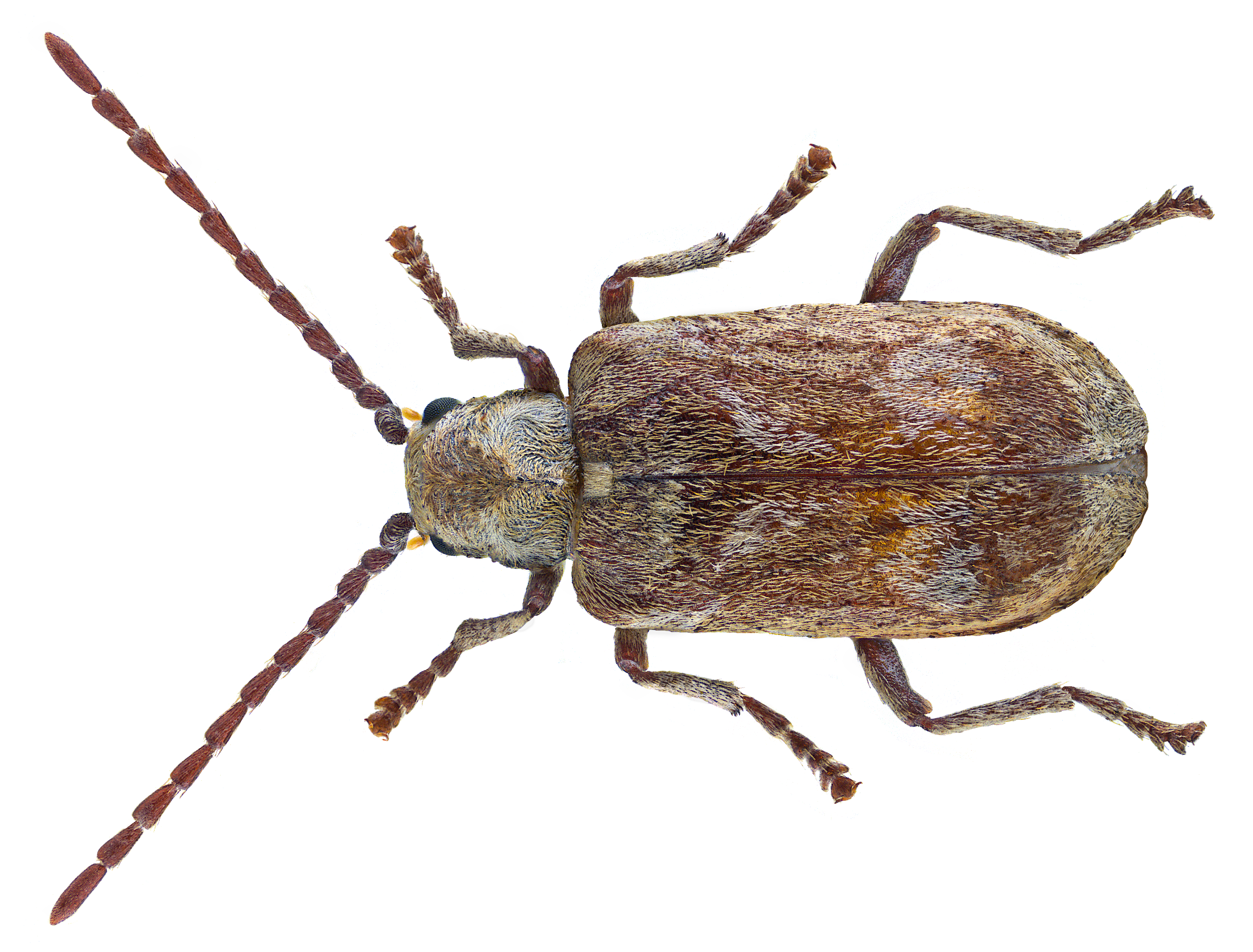
- Hedobia imperialis

Scientific classification
- Kingdom: Animalia
- Phylum: Arthropoda
- Class: Insecta
- Order: Coleoptera
- Suborder: Polyphaga
- Family: Ptinidae
- Tribe: Hedobiini
- Genus: Hedobia; Dejean, 1821

= Hedobia =

Genus of beetles

Hedobia is a genus of beetles in the family Ptinidae native to Europe and the Near East. There are at least four described species in Hedobia.

== Species ==
These four species belong to the genus Hedobia:

- Hedobia angulata Fall, 1905^{i c g}
- Hedobia granosa LeConte, 1874^{i c g}
- Hedobia pubescens (Olivier, 1790)^{g}
- Hedobia semivittata Van Dyke, 1923^{i c g}

Data sources: i = ITIS, c = Catalogue of Life, g = GBIF, b = Bugguide.net
