= Eucrada =

Scientific classification
- Kingdom: Animalia
- Phylum: Arthropoda
- Class: Insecta
- Order: Coleoptera
- Suborder: Polyphaga
- Family: Ptinidae
- Subfamily: Eucradinae
- Genus: Eucrada; LeConte, 1861

Genus of beetles

Eucrada is a genus of death-watch and spider beetles in the family Ptinidae. There are at least two described species in Eucrada.

== Species ==
These two species belong to the genus Eucrada:

- Eucrada humeralis (Melsheimer, 1846)^{i c g b}
- Eucrada robusta Van Dyke, 1918^{i c g}

Data sources: i = ITIS, c = Catalogue of Life, g = GBIF, b = Bugguide.net
