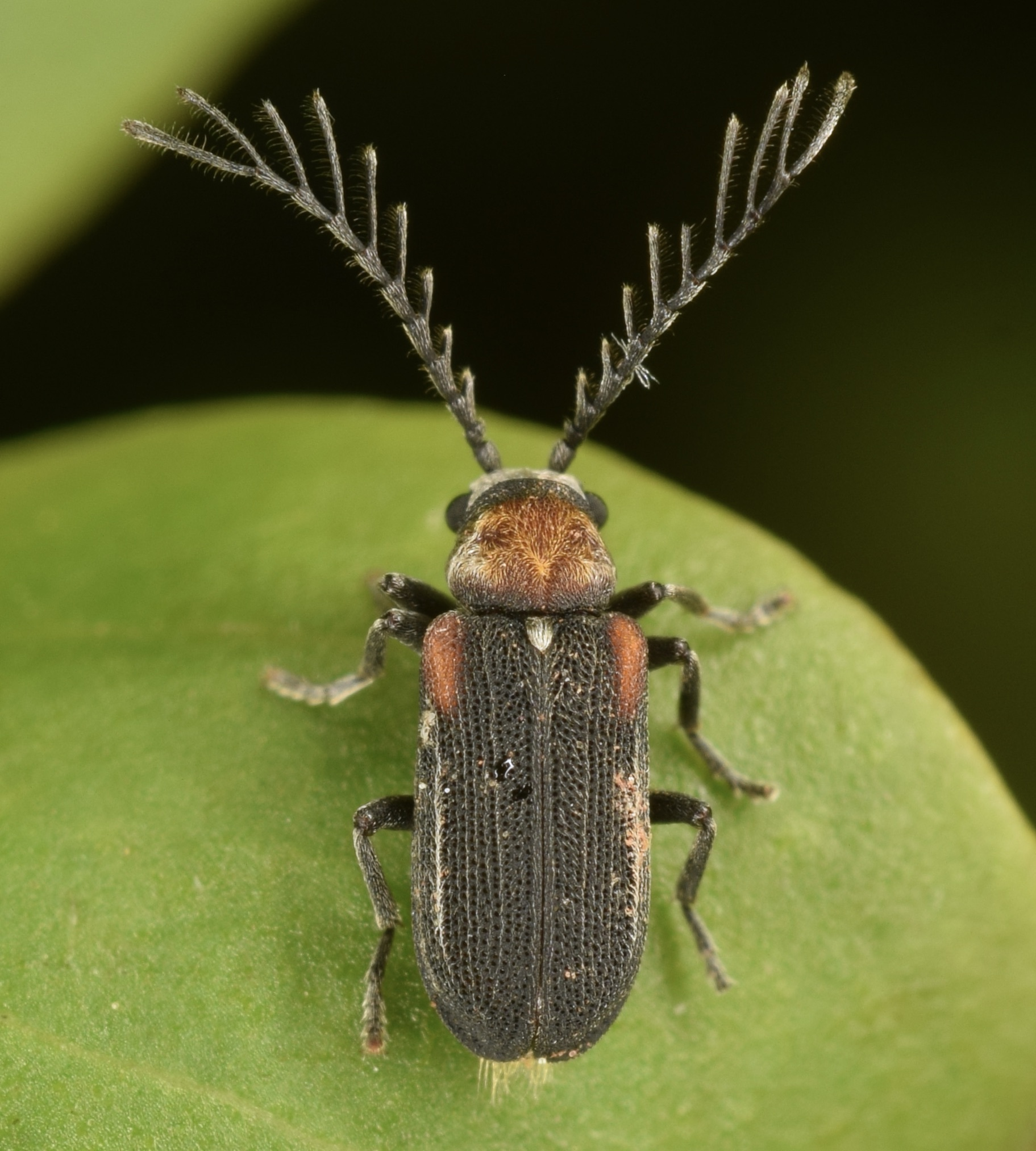

Scientific classification
- Kingdom: Animalia
- Phylum: Arthropoda
- Clade: Pancrustacea
- Class: Insecta
- Order: Coleoptera
- Suborder: Polyphaga
- Family: Ptinidae
- Genus: Eucrada
- Species: E. humeralis

Binomial name
- Eucrada humeralis (Melsheimer, 1846)

= Eucrada humeralis =

Species of beetle

Eucrada humeralis is a species of beetle in the family Ptinidae. It is found in North America.
