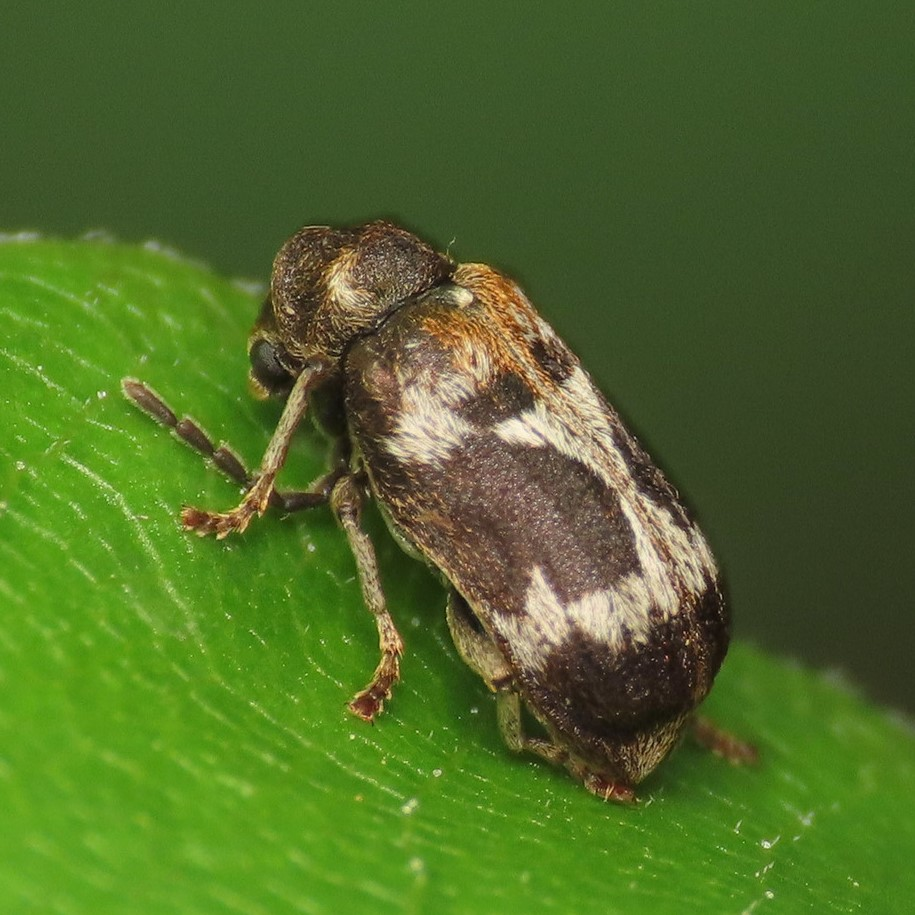
- Ptinomorphus regalis

Scientific classification
- Domain: Eukaryota
- Kingdom: Animalia
- Phylum: Arthropoda
- Class: Insecta
- Order: Coleoptera
- Suborder: Polyphaga
- Family: Ptinidae
- Tribe: Hedobiini
- Genus: Ptinomorphus; Mulsant & Rey, 1868

Synonyms
- Priomorphus Schilsky, 1899

= Ptinomorphus =

Genus of beetles

Ptinomorphus is a genus of beetles belonging to the family Ptinidae.

The species of this genus are found in Europe, Japan and Northern America.

== Species ==
The following species are recognised in the genus Ptinomorphus:

- Ptinomorphus angustatus (C.Brisout de Barneville, 1862)
- Ptinomorphus imperialis (Linnaeus, 1767)
- Ptinomorphus janae Levey, 2021
- Ptinomorphus magnificus (Reitter, 1880)
- Ptinomorphus perpulchrus (Obenberger, 1917)
- Ptinomorphus regalis (Duftschmid, 1825)
- Ptinomorphus rosti (Pic, 1896)
- Ptinomorphus sericeus Toskina, 2001
- Ptinomorphus tatjanae Logvinovskiy, 1978
