= Neohedobia =

Scientific classification
- Kingdom: Animalia
- Phylum: Arthropoda
- Clade: Pancrustacea
- Class: Insecta
- Order: Coleoptera
- Suborder: Polyphaga
- Family: Ptinidae
- Tribe: Hedobiini
- Genus: Neohedobia; Fisher, 1919
- Species: N. texana

Binomial name
- Neohedobia texana Fisher, 1919

Genus of beetles

Neohedobia is a genus of death-watch and spider beetles in the family Ptinidae. There is one described species in Neohedobia, N. texana.
