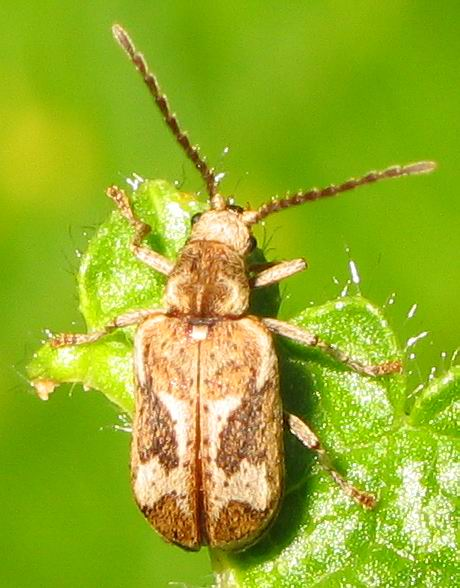
- Hebobia Imperialis beetle

Scientific classification
- Kingdom: Animalia
- Phylum: Arthropoda
- Clade: Pancrustacea
- Class: Insecta
- Order: Coleoptera
- Suborder: Polyphaga
- Family: Ptinidae
- Subfamily: Eucradinae
- Tribe: Hedobiini; Mulsant & Rey, 1868

= Hedobiini =

Tribe of beetles

Hedobiini is a tribe of death-watch and spider beetles in the family Ptinidae. There are at least two genera and three described species in Hedobiini.

== Genera ==
These two genera belong to the tribe Hedobiini:

- Neohedobia Fisher, 1919^{i c g b}
- Ptinomorphus Mulsant & Rey, 1868^{g b}

Data sources: i = ITIS, c = Catalogue of Life, g = GBIF, b = Bugguide.net
