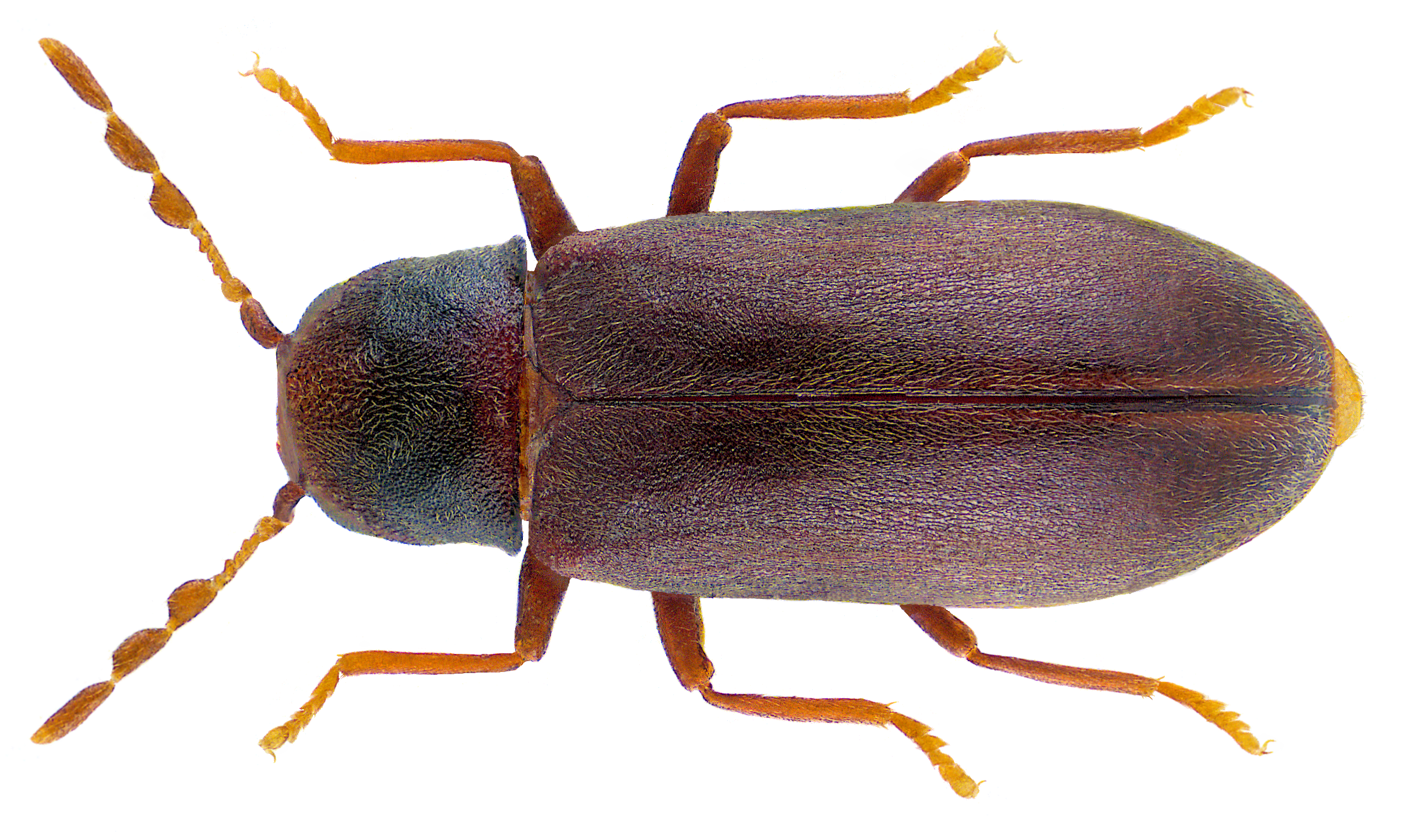

Scientific classification
- Kingdom: Animalia
- Phylum: Arthropoda
- Class: Insecta
- Order: Coleoptera
- Suborder: Polyphaga
- Family: Ptinidae
- Genus: Gastrallus
- Species: G. immarginatus

Binomial name
- Gastrallus immarginatus (Müller, 1821)

= Gastrallus immarginatus =

Species of beetle

Gastrallus immarginatus is a species of death-watch beetle in the family Ptinidae.
