= Gastrallus marginipennis =

Scientific classification
- Kingdom: Animalia
- Phylum: Arthropoda
- Class: Insecta
- Order: Coleoptera
- Suborder: Polyphaga
- Family: Ptinidae
- Genus: Gastrallus
- Species: G. marginipennis

Binomial name
- Gastrallus marginipennis LeConte, 1879

Species of beetle

Gastrallus marginipennis is a species of death-watch beetle in the family Ptinidae. It is found in North America.
