= Falsogastrallus =

Scientific classification
- Kingdom: Animalia
- Phylum: Arthropoda
- Class: Insecta
- Order: Coleoptera
- Suborder: Polyphaga
- Family: Ptinidae
- Tribe: Gastrallini
- Genus: Falsogastrallus; Pic, 1914

Genus of beetles

Falsogastrallus is a genus of beetles in the family Ptinidae. There are at least three described species in Falsogastrallus.

== Species ==
These three species belong to the genus Falsogastrallus:

- Falsogastrallus librinocens (Fisher, 1938)^{i c g}
- Falsogastrallus sauteri Pic, 1914^{g}
- Falsogastrallus unistriatus (Zoufal, 1897)^{g}

Data sources: i = ITIS, c = Catalogue of Life, g = GBIF, b = Bugguide.net
