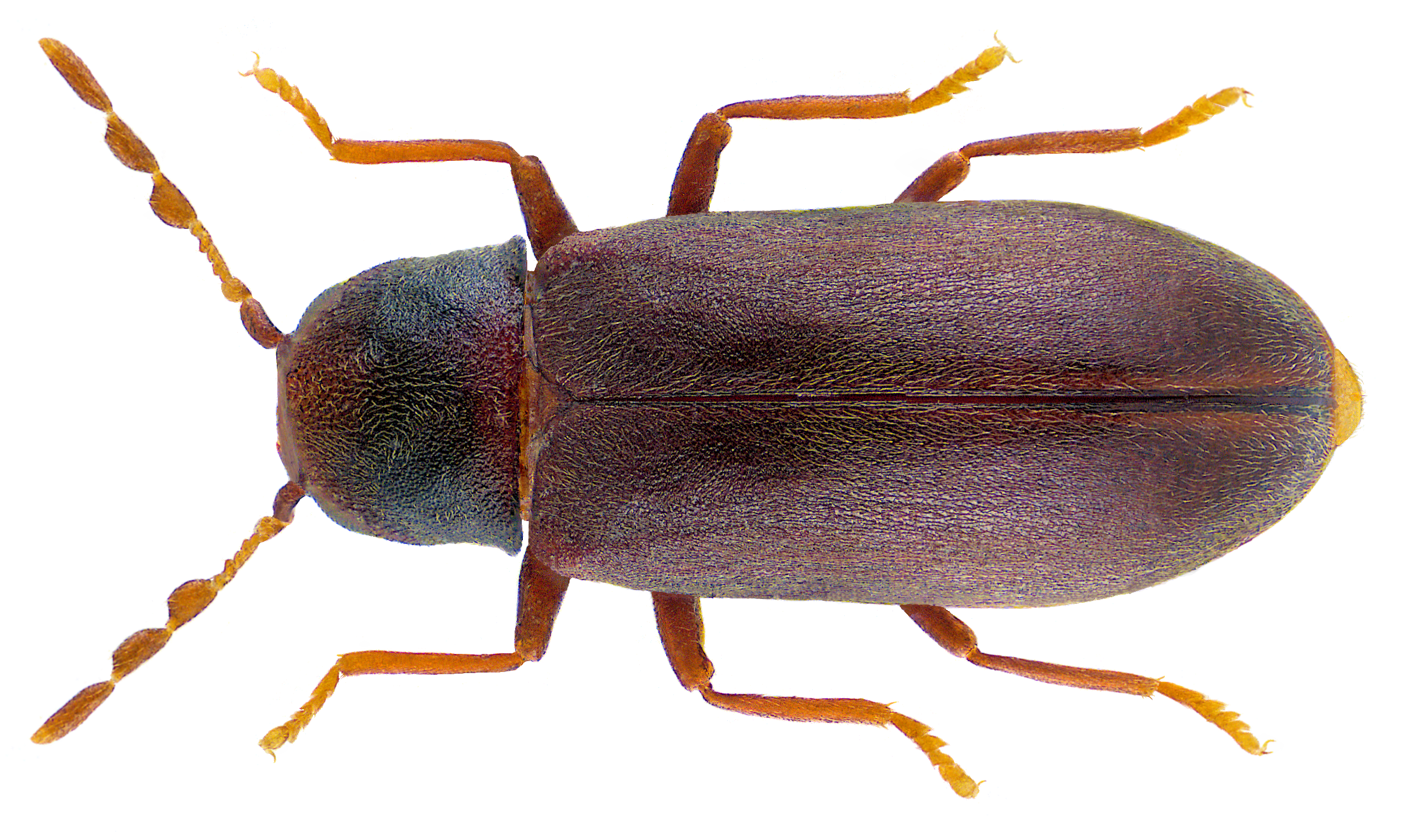
- Gastrallus immarginatus

Scientific classification
- Kingdom: Animalia
- Phylum: Arthropoda
- Class: Insecta
- Order: Coleoptera
- Suborder: Polyphaga
- Family: Ptinidae
- Tribe: Gastrallini
- Genus: Gastrallus; Jacquelin du Val, 1860

= Gastrallus =

Genus of beetles

Gastrallus is a genus of beetles in the family Ptinidae. They are distributed nearly worldwide except Australia and Central and South America; almost half are native to the Palearctic realm.

Currently, almost 100 species are scientifically described:

Gastrallus immarginatus group:

- Gastrallus abbreviatus Zahradník, 2009 – recorded from Thailand
- Gastrallus assamensis Zahradník, 2009 – recorded from India
- Gastrallus cymoreki Español, 1990 – recorded from Nepal
- Gastrallus immarginatus P. W. J. Müller, 1821 – recorded from Armenia, Austria, Belgium, Bulgaria, China, Croatia, Czech Republic, Denmark, France, Great Britain, Germany, Greece, Hungary, Italy, Poland, Russia, Slovakia, Spain, Sweden, Switzerland, Ukraine, Tunisia; also on Sri Lanka?
- Gastrallus ornatulus Toskina, 2003 – recorded from Azerbaijan and Southern Russia
- Gastrallus tuberculatus Pic, 1914 – recorded from Taiwan, Laos, Vietnam and the Palaearctic realm
- Gastrallus wittmeri Español, 1977 – recorded from Bhutan and Nepal

Gastrallus laevigatus group:

- Gastrallus abyssinicus Español, 1963 – recorded from the Republic of the Congo (Brazzaville), Ethiopia and India
- Gastrallus affinis Sakai, 1984 – recorded from Japan
- Gastrallus asgardi Zahradník, 2009 – recorded from Thailand
- Gastrallus birmanicus Pic, 1937 – recorded from Myanmar
- Gastrallus bremeri Español, 1983 – recorded from Thailand
- Gastrallus brunneus Zahradník, 2009 – recorded from Thailand
- Gastrallus chantaburensis Zahradník, 2009 – recorded from Thailand
- Gastrallus chiangmaiensis Zahradník, 2009 – recorded from Thailand
- Gastrallus clematorum Fursov in Sinadskiy, 1958 – recorded from Uzbekistan
- Gastrallus corsicus Schilsky, 1898 – recorded from Algeria, Croatia, France, Greece, Israel, Italy, Morocco, Portugal, Spain, Syria
- Gastrallus cucullatus Lesne, 1902 – recorded from Sri Lanka
- Gastrallus dimidiatus Sakai, 1984 – recorded from Japan
- Gastrallus erdosi Toskina, 2003 – recorded from Israel
- Gastrallus haucki Zahradník, 2009 – recorded from India
- Gastrallus havai Zahradník, 2009 – recorded from Thailand
- Gastrallus horaki Zahradník, 2009 – recorded from Thailand
- Gastrallus indicus Reitter, 1913 – Indian bookworm beetle – recorded from Uttar Pradesh (India), Myanmar and the Palearctic realm
- Gastrallus insuetus Logvinovskiy, 1978 – recorded from Kazakhstan
- Gastrallus insulcatus Pic, 1937 – recorded from Uttar Pradesh (India)
- Gastrallus jendeki Zahradník, 2009 – recorded from Laos
- Gastrallus jurciceki Zahradník, 2009 – recorded from Thailand
- Gastrallus kejvali Zahradník, 2009 – recorded from India
- Gastrallus knizeki Zahradník, 1996 – recorded from Austria, Czech Republic, France, Germany, Slovakia
- Gastrallus kocheri Español, 1963 – recorded from Greece (Crete), Italy, Morocco, Spain, Tunisia
- Gastrallus laevigatus (Olivier, 1790) – recorded from Algeria, Austria, Belgium, Bosnia and Herzegovina, Bulgaria, Croatia, Cyprus, Czech Republic, France, Germany, Georgia, Greece, Hungary, Israel, Italy, Japan, Morocco, Poland, Portugal, Russia, Slovakia, Spain, Switzerland, Syria, The Netherlands, Tunisia, Turkey, Ukraine
- Gastrallus laosensis Zahradník, 2009 – recorded from Laos
- Gastrallus laticollis Pic, 1929 – recorded from Singapore
- Gastrallus latus Zahradník, 2009 – recorded from Thailand
- Gastrallus ludmilae Zahradník, 2009 – recorded from Malaysia
- Gastrallus lyctoides (Wollaston, 1865) – recorded from the Canary Islands (Spain)
- Gastrallus mareceki Zahradník, 2009 – recorded from Thailand
- Gastrallus mauritanicus Español, 1963 – recorded from Italy, Morocco, Tunisia, Turkey
- Gastrallus minor Zahradník, 2009 – recorded from Thailand
- Gastrallus natalkae Zahradník, 2009 – recorded from Thailand
- Gastrallus nikolkae Zahradník, 2009 – recorded from Thailand
- Gastrallus pacholatkoi Zahradník, 2009 – recorded from Laos
- Gastrallus parvus Zahradník, 2009 – recorded from Malaysia
- Gastrallus phloeophagus Iablokoff-Khnzorian, 1960 – recorded from Armenia
- Gastrallus plicaticollis Pic, 1937 – recorded from India
- Gastrallus prudeki Zahradník, 2009 – recorded from Thailand
- Gastrallus pubens Fairmaire, 1875 (= Gastrallus insulcatus Pic, 1937) – recorded from Azerbaijan, Chad, Egypt, Ethiopia, India, Israel, Italy, Jordan, Kenya, Lebanon, Senegal, Spain, Sudan, Syria, Tunisia, Turkmenistan and Uganda
- Gastrallus pusillus Español, 1983 – recorded from Thailand
- Gastrallus rolciki Zahradník, 2009 – recorded from India
- Gastrallus rollei Reitter, 1912 – recorded from Spain
- Gastrallus rufus Zahradník, 2009 – recorded from Thailand
- Gastrallus sausai Zahradník, 2009 – recorded from Laos
- Gastrallus siamensis Zahradník, 2009 – recorded from Thailand
- Gastrallus subtilis Toskina, 1998 – recorded from Saudi Arabia
- Gastrallus svihlai Zahradník, 2009 – recorded from Thailand
- Gastrallus svobodaorum Zahradník, 2009 – recorded from Thailand
- Gastrallus testaceicornis Pic, 1922 – recorded from Taiwan
- Gastrallus testaceus Pic, 1936 – recorded from Malaysia
- Gastrallus thailandicus Zahradník, 2009 – recorded from Thailand
- Gastrallus vavrai Zahradník, 2007 – recorded from Turkey
- Gastrallus vulgaris Zahradník, 2009 – recorded from Thailand
- Gastrallus whitei Zahradník, 2009 – recorded from Thailand

Unassigned to a species group:

- Gastrallus alluaudi Pic, 1948 – recorded from Djibouti
- Gastrallus basilewskyi Español, 1963 – recorded from the Republic of the Congo (Kinshasa) and Zimbabwe
- Gastrallus bilyi Zahradník, 2008 – recorded from South Africa
- Gastrallus cervelloi Viñolas, 1999 – recorded from Equatorial Guinea
- Gastrallus degallieri Español, 1992 – recorded from Central African Republic
- Gastrallus fasciatus White, 1976 – recorded from North America
- Gastrallus flagellatus Zahradník, 2008 – recorded from Kenya
- Gastrallus gabonicus Español, 1963 – recorded from Gabon
- Gastrallus granulatus Zahradník, 2008 – recorded from Kenya
- Gastrallus janae Zahradník, 2008 – recorded from Kenya
- Gastrallus jeremiasi Viñolas & Masó, 2007 – recorded from South Africa
- Gastrallus karelai Zahradník, 2008 – recorded from Kenya
- Gastrallus kaszabi Español, 1966 – recorded from Ghana
- Gastrallus kenyaensis Zahradník, 2008 – recorded from Kenya
- Gastrallus krugerensis Viñolas & Masó, 2007 – recorded from South Africa
- Gastrallus kuboni Zahradník, 2008 – recorded from Tanzania
- Gastrallus makerensis Español & Viñolas, 1996 – recorded from Rwanda
- Gastrallus marginipennis LeConte, 1879 – recorded from North America
- Gastrallus minutus Español & Comas, 1991 – recorded from Botswana, South Africa, Tanzania
- Gastrallus natalensis Zahradník, 2008 – recorded from South Africa
- Gastrallus ndumuensis Viñolas & Masó, 2007 – recorded from South Africa
- Gastrallus omedesae Viñolas & Masó, 2007 – recorded from South Africa
- Gastrallus pafuriensis Viñolas & Masó, 2007 – recorded from South Africa
- Gastrallus pruinosus (Pic, 1904) – recorded from Madagascar
- Gastrallus ribesi Español, 1992 – recorded from Equatorial Guinea
- Gastrallus rorkei Español & Comas, 1991 – recorded from South Africa
- Gastrallus sasajii Sakai, 2007 – recorded from Japan
- Gastrallus skukuzaensis Viñolas & Masó, 2007 – recorded from South Africa
- Gastrallus snizeki Zahradník, 2008 – recorded from South Africa
- Gastrallus strydomi Viñolas & Masó, 2007 – recorded from South Africa
- Gastrallus varii Español & Comas, 1991 – recorded from South Africa, Zimbabwe
- Gastrallus vinyolasi Español, 1992 – recorded from Central African Republic
- Gastrallus vrydaghi Español, 1963 – recorded from Ivory Coast, Sudan, Tanzania
