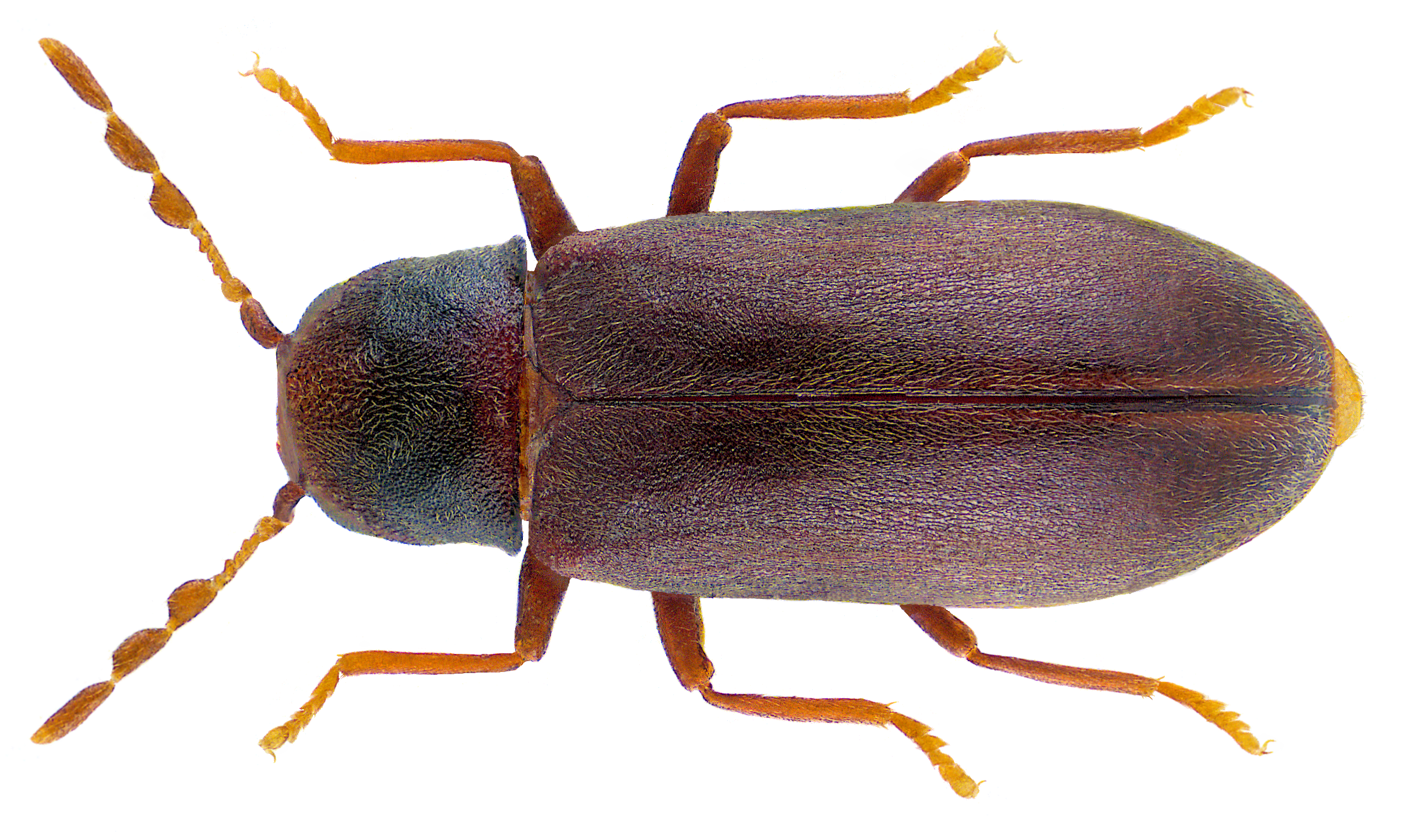
- Gastrallus immarginatus

Scientific classification
- Kingdom: Animalia
- Phylum: Arthropoda
- Class: Insecta
- Order: Coleoptera
- Suborder: Polyphaga
- Family: Ptinidae
- Subfamily: Anobiinae
- Tribe: Gastrallini

= Gastrallini =

Tribe of beetles

Gastrallini is a tribe of death-watch beetles in the family Ptinidae. There are at least 4 genera in Gastrallini.

== Genera ==
These genera belong to the tribe Gastrallini:

- Falsogastrallus Pic, 1914^{i c g}
- Gastrallus Jacquelin du Val, 1860^{i c g b}
- Hemigastrallus Español et Comas, 1991
- Mimogastrallus Sakai, 2003^{g}

Data sources: i = ITIS, c = Catalogue of Life, g = GBIF, b = Bugguide.net
