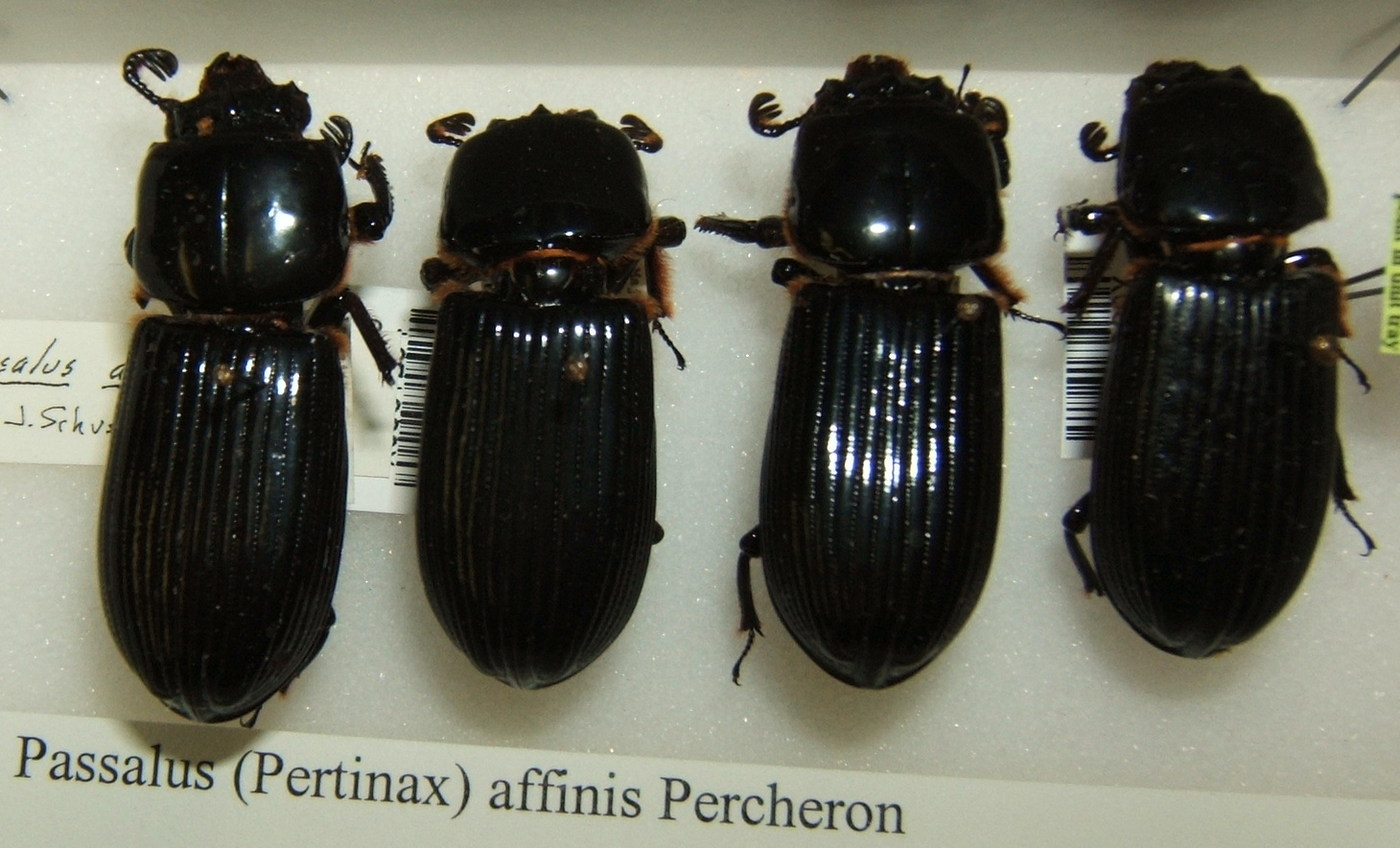
- Passalus affinis, adult

Scientific classification
- Domain: Eukaryota
- Kingdom: Animalia
- Phylum: Arthropoda
- Class: Insecta
- Order: Coleoptera
- Suborder: Polyphaga
- Infraorder: Scarabaeiformia
- Family: Passalidae
- Genus: Passalus
- Species: P. affinis

Binomial name
- Passalus affinis Percheron, 1835

= Passalus affinis =

Species of beetle

Passalus affinis is a beetle of the family Passalidae. Some sources report it as endemic to Hispaniola, whereas others give it a wider distribution in South America (Brazil) and the Greater Antilles (Cuba, Hispaniola).

Passalus affinis measures 43–49 mm (1.7–1.9 in) in total length.
