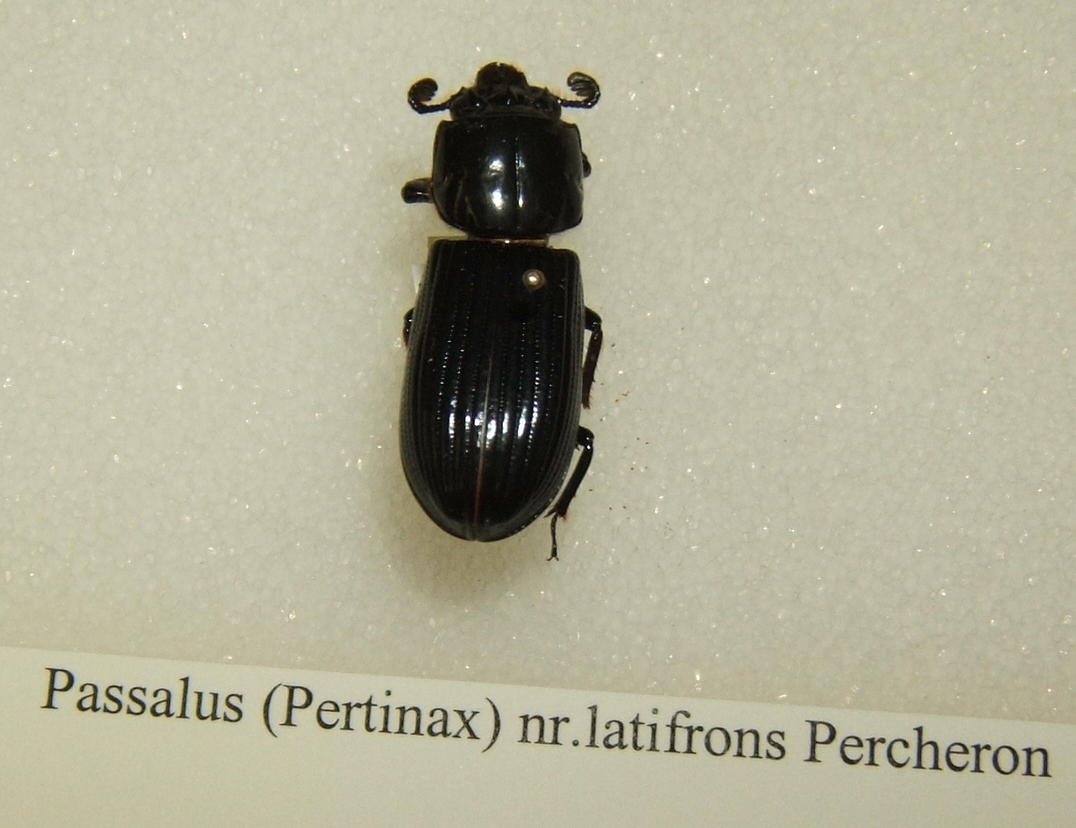
- Passalus latifrons, adult

Scientific classification
- Kingdom: Animalia
- Phylum: Arthropoda
- Class: Insecta
- Order: Coleoptera
- Suborder: Polyphaga
- Infraorder: Scarabaeiformia
- Family: Passalidae
- Genus: Passalus
- Species: P. latifrons

Binomial name
- Passalus latifrons Percheron, 1841

Synonyms
- Pertinax latifrons (Percheron, 1841)

= Passalus latifrons =

Species of beetle

Passalus latifrons is a beetle of the family Passalidae. It is found in the northern South America (Brazil, Peru, Colombia, French Guiana, Suriname, Trinidad and Tobago.
