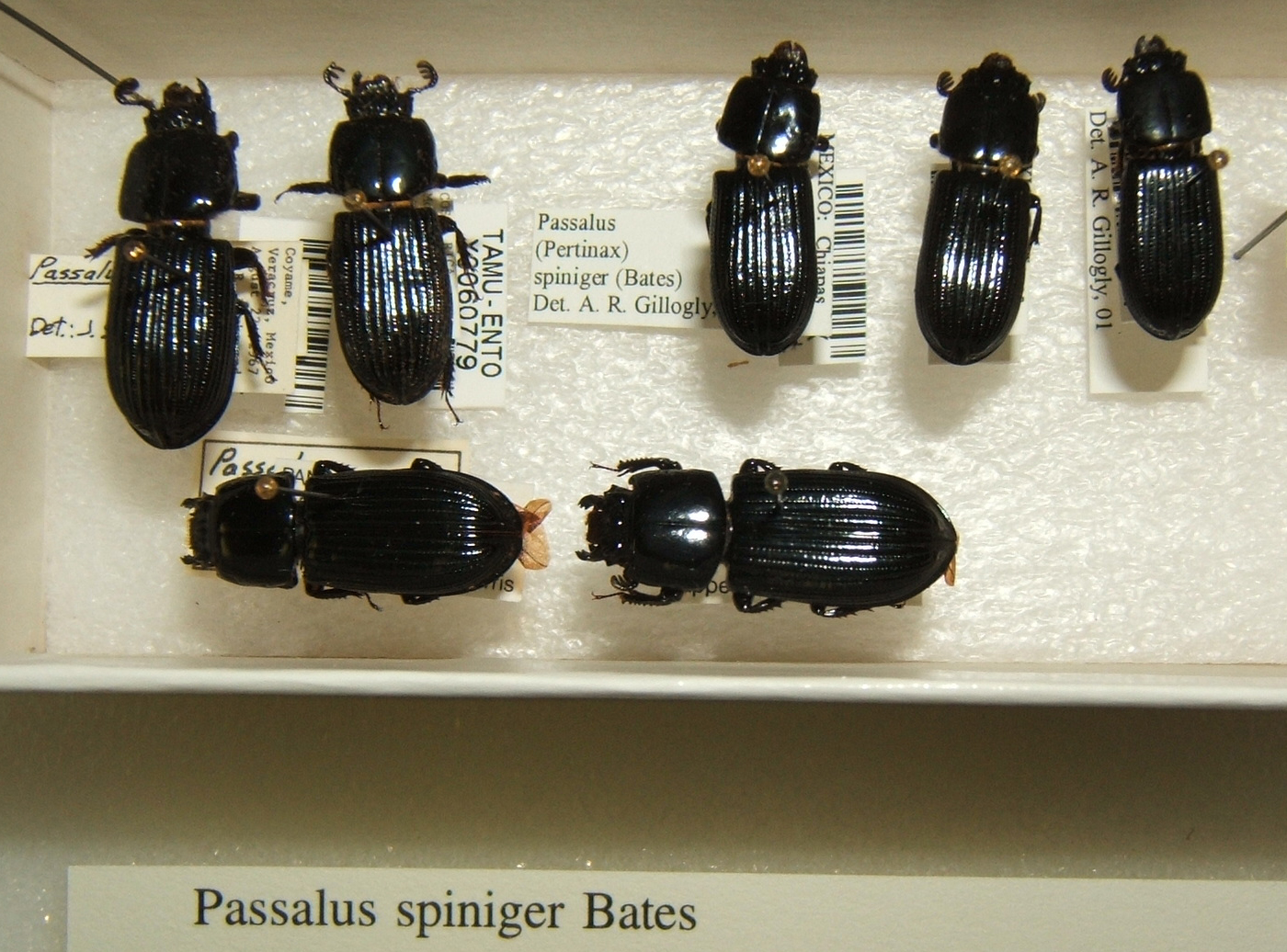
- Passalus spiniger, adults

Scientific classification
- Kingdom: Animalia
- Phylum: Arthropoda
- Class: Insecta
- Order: Coleoptera
- Suborder: Polyphaga
- Infraorder: Scarabaeiformia
- Family: Passalidae
- Genus: Passalus
- Species: P. spiniger

Binomial name
- Passalus spiniger Bates

= Passalus spiniger =

Species of beetle

Passalus spiniger is a beetle of the family Passalidae.
