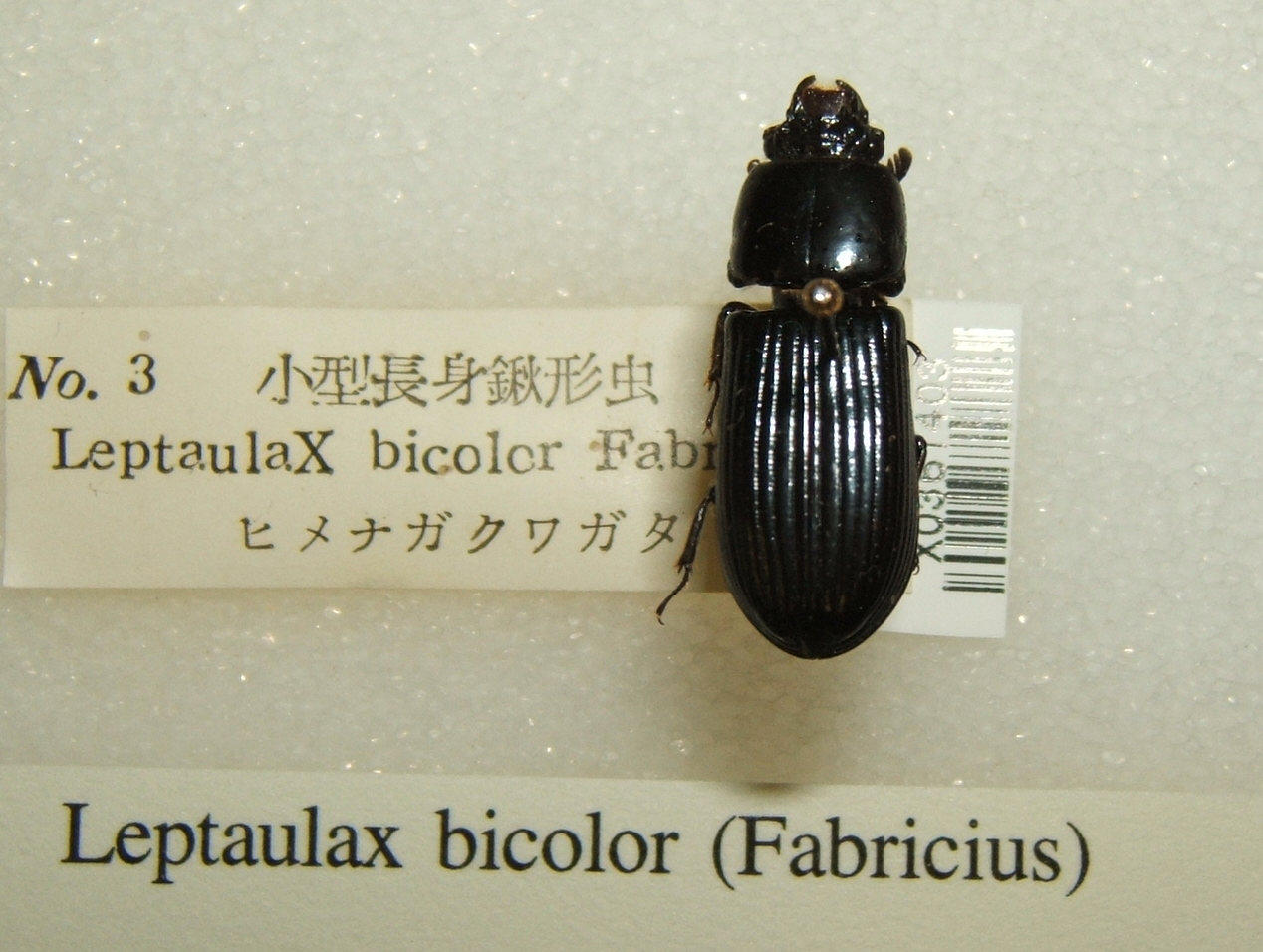
- Adult

Scientific classification
- Kingdom: Animalia
- Phylum: Arthropoda
- Clade: Pancrustacea
- Class: Insecta
- Order: Coleoptera
- Suborder: Polyphaga
- Infraorder: Scarabaeiformia
- Family: Passalidae
- Genus: Leptaulax
- Species: L. bicolor

Binomial name
- Leptaulax bicolor (Fabricius, 1801)

= Leptaulax bicolor =

Species of beetle

Leptaulax bicolor is a beetle of the family Passalidae found throughout Australia, Cambodia, Eastern Himalayas, India, Indonesia: Borneo, Java, Moluccas, Sulawesi, Sumatra; Laos, Malaysia, Myanmar, New Guinea, Philippines, Sri Lanka, Thailand and Vietnam.

== Synonyms ==
There are several synonyms assigned to the species due to widespread distribution and similarity with other related species.

- Leptaulacides analis Zang, 1906
- Leptaulacides anaulax Zang, 1905
- Leptaulacides andamanarum Zang, 1905
- Leptaulacides fruhstorferi Zang, 1905
- Leptaulacides nietneri Zang, 1905
- Leptaulacides palawanicus Zang, 1905
- Leptaulacides papuanus Zang, 1906
- Leptaulacides rugulosus Zang, 1905
- Leptaulax abdominisculptus Kuwert, 1891
- Leptaulax aurivillii Kuwert, 1891
- Leptaulax batchianae Kuwert, 1891
- Leptaulax calcuttae Kuwert, 1891
- Leptaulax cicatricosus Kuwert, 1891
- Leptaulax consequens Kuwert, 1891
- Leptaulax differentispina Kuwert, 1891
- Leptaulax dindigalensis Kuwert, 1898
- Leptaulax divaricatus Kuwert, 1898
- Leptaulax evidens Kuwert, 1898
- Leptaulax formosanus Doesburg, 1942
- Leptaulax geminus Kuwert, 1898
- Leptaulax hansemanni Kuwert, 1898
- Leptaulax incipiens Kuwert, 1891
- Leptaulax malaccae Kuwert, 1891
- Leptaulax manillae Kuwert, 1891
- Leptaulax maxillonotus Kuwert, 1891
- Leptaulax medius Kuwert, 1891
- Leptaulax morator Kuwert, 1898
- Leptaulax niae Kuwert, 1898
- Leptaulax novaeguineae Kuwert, 1891
- Leptaulax obtusidens Kuwert, 1891
- Leptaulax roepstorfi Kuwert, 1898
- Leptaulax separandus Kuwert, 1891
- Leptaulax sequens Kuwert, 1898
- Leptaulax subconsequens Kuwert, 1891
- Leptaulax sumatrae Kuwert, 1898
- Leptaulax tenesserimensis Kuwert, 1898
- Passalus innocuus Dejean, 1837
- Passalus vicinus Percheron, 1844
- Passalus bicolor Fabricius, 1801
