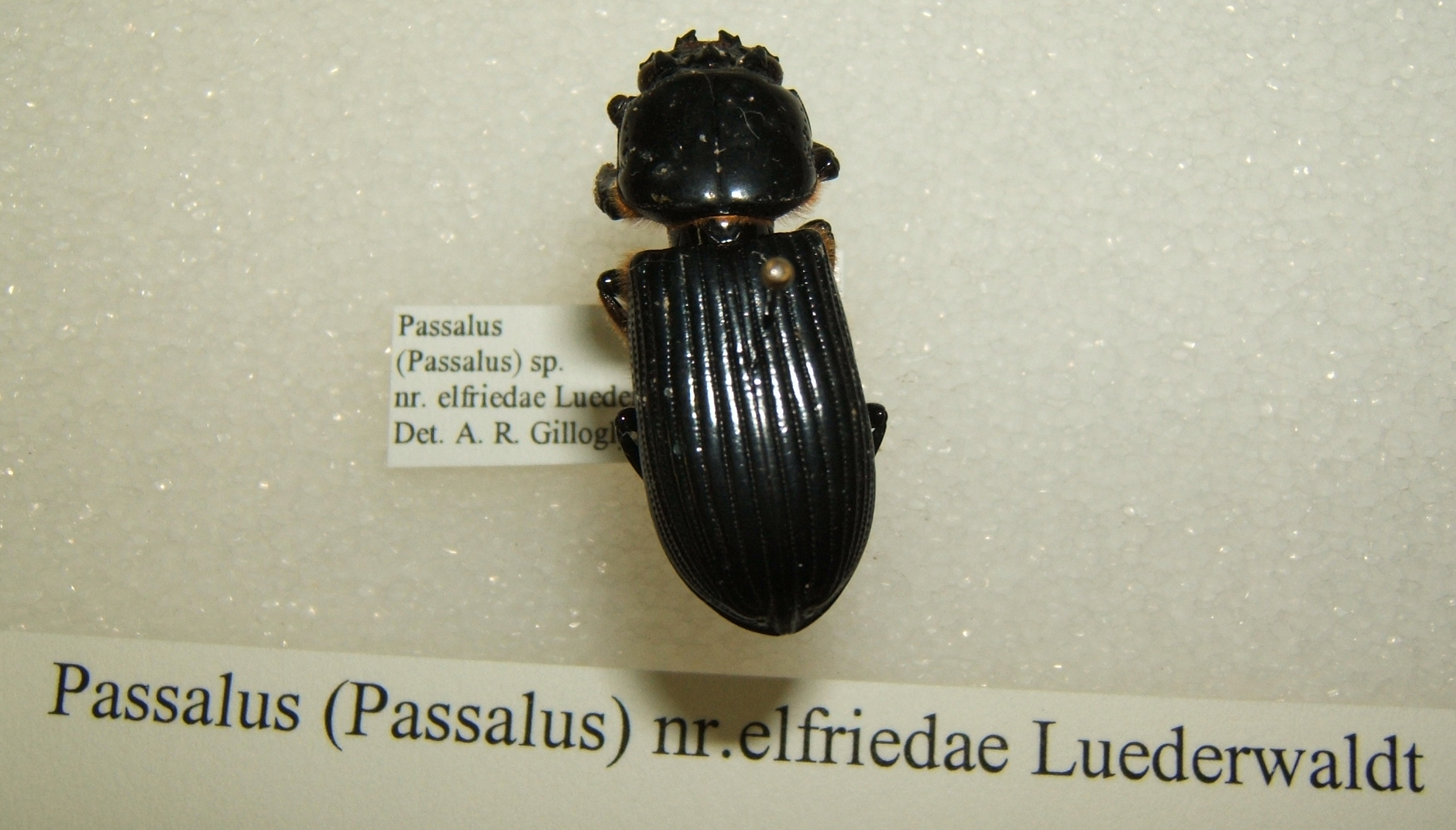
- Toxeutotaenius elfriedae, adult

Scientific classification
- Kingdom: Animalia
- Phylum: Arthropoda
- Clade: Pancrustacea
- Class: Insecta
- Order: Coleoptera
- Suborder: Polyphaga
- Infraorder: Scarabaeiformia
- Family: Passalidae
- Genus: Toxeutotaenius
- Species: T. elfriedae

Binomial name
- Toxeutotaenius elfriedae Luederwaldt, 1931

Synonyms
- Passalus elfriedae

= Toxeutotaenius elfriedae =

Species of beetle

Toxeutotaenius elfriedae is a South American beetle of the family Passalidae.
