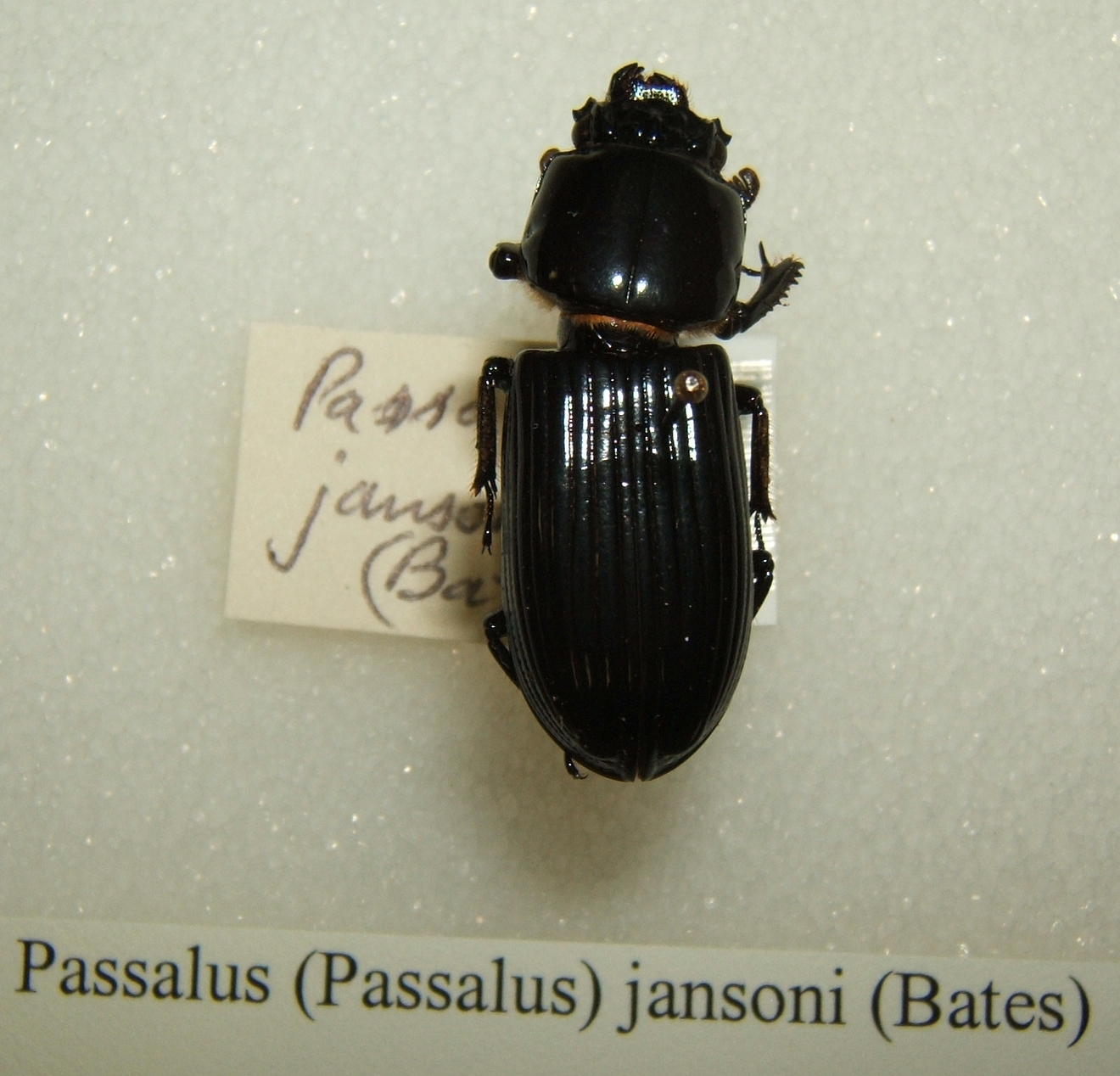
- Passalus jansoni, adult

Scientific classification
- Domain: Eukaryota
- Kingdom: Animalia
- Phylum: Arthropoda
- Class: Insecta
- Order: Coleoptera
- Suborder: Polyphaga
- Infraorder: Scarabaeiformia
- Family: Passalidae
- Genus: Passalus
- Species: P. jansoni

Binomial name
- Passalus jansoni (Bates, 1886)

= Passalus jansoni =

Species of beetle

Passalus jansoni is a beetle of the family Passalidae native to Central America.
