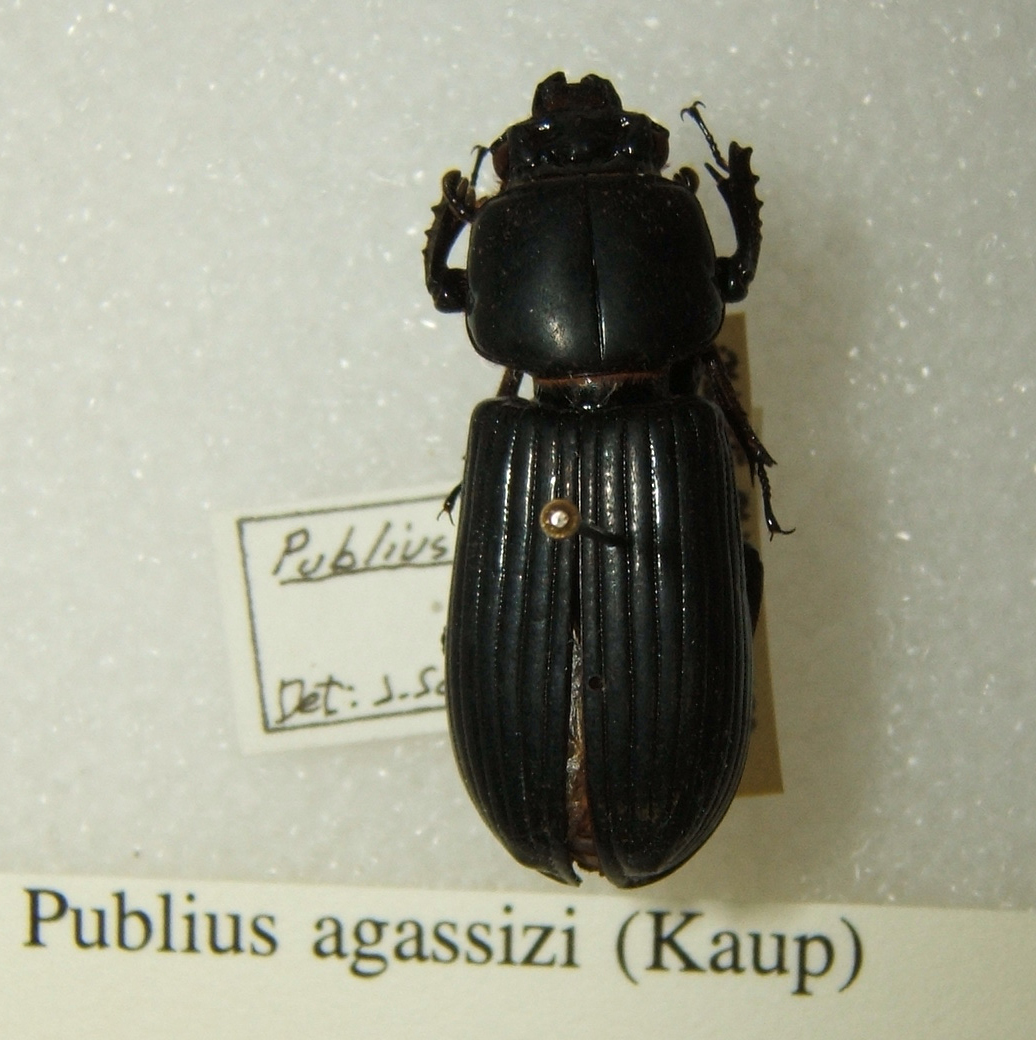
- Arrox agassizi, adult

Scientific classification
- Kingdom: Animalia
- Phylum: Arthropoda
- Class: Insecta
- Order: Coleoptera
- Family: Passalidae
- Genus: Arrox
- Species: A. agassizi

Binomial name
- Arrox agassizi (Kaup, 1871)

Synonyms
- Publius agassizi (Kaup, 1871); Sertorius agassizi Kaup, 1871

= Arrox agassizi =

Species of beetle

Arrox agassizi is a beetle of the family Passalidae, named in honor of Louis Agassiz. Females can produce fertile eggs in isolation, although that is a rare occurrence in the wild.
