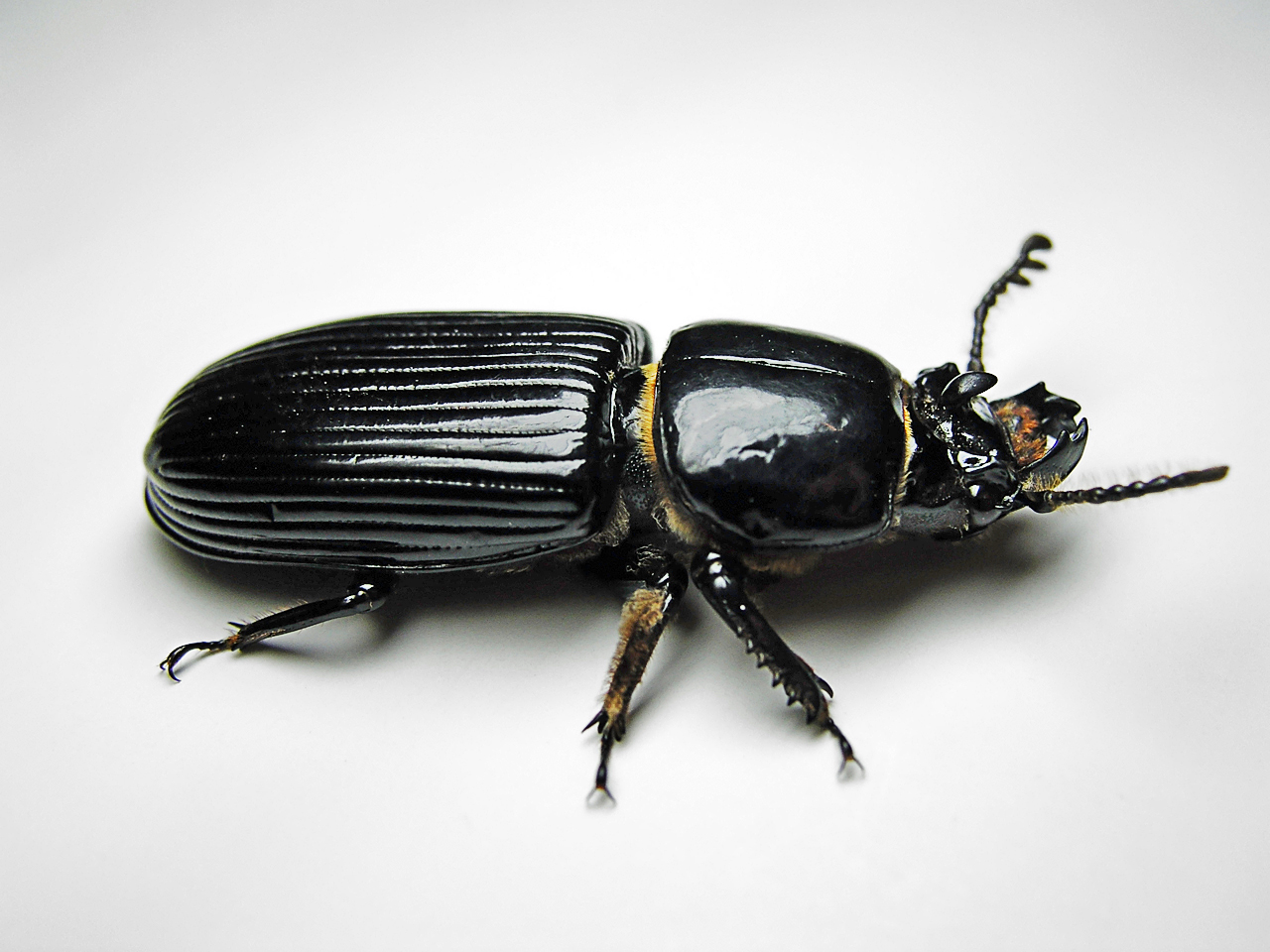
- Adult Odontotaenius disjunctus
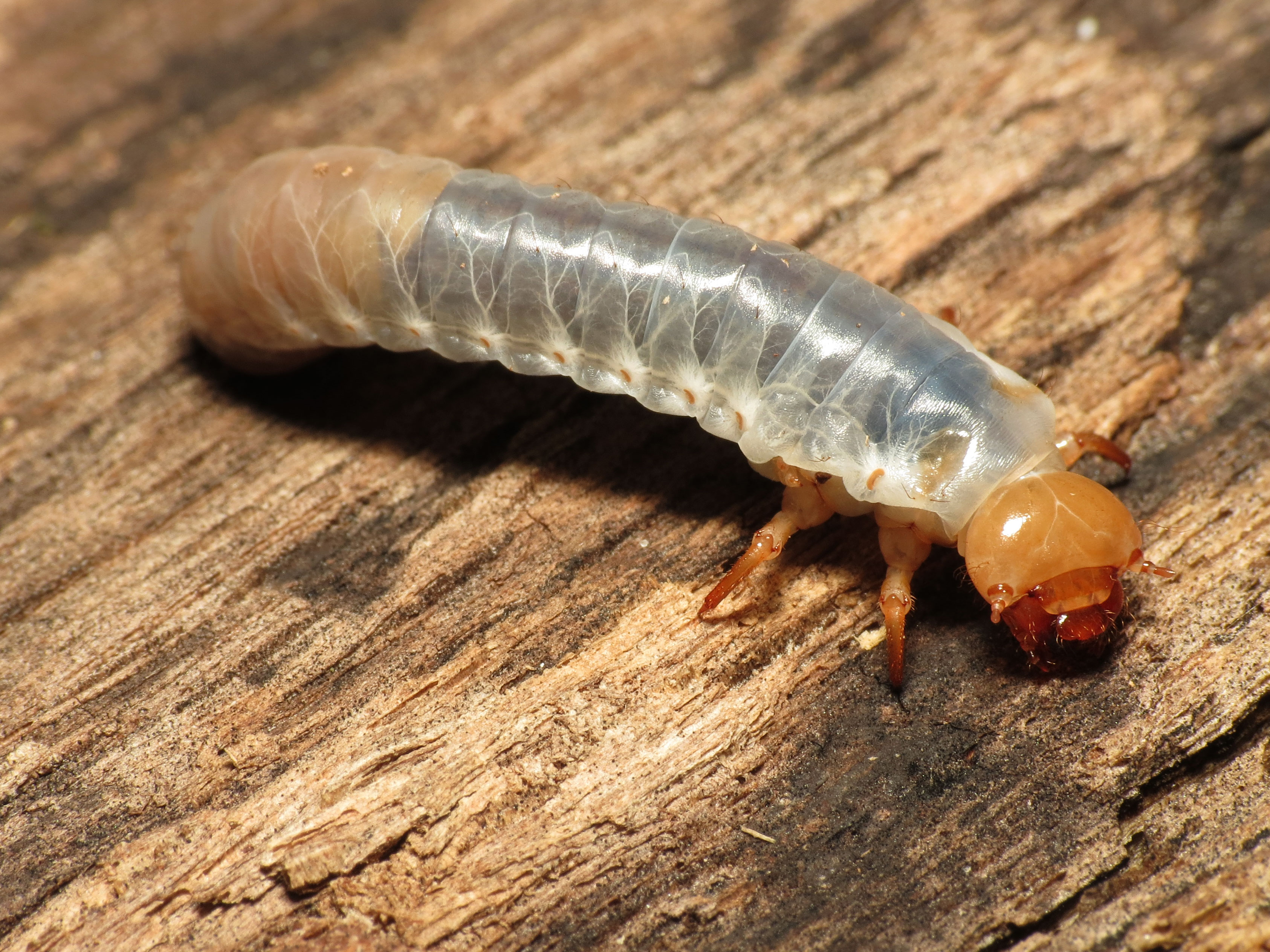
- Larva of Odontotaenius disjunctus

Scientific classification
- Kingdom: Animalia
- Phylum: Arthropoda
- Clade: Pancrustacea
- Class: Insecta
- Order: Coleoptera
- Suborder: Polyphaga
- Infraorder: Scarabaeiformia
- Superfamily: Scarabaeoidea
- Family: Passalidae; Leach, 1815

Genera
- Didimus; Mastochilus; Odontotaenius; Passalus; Pharochilus; Ptichopus many more

Diversity
- > 500 species

= Passalidae =

Passalidae Temporal range: Cenomanian–Recent

Family of beetles

Passalidae is a family of beetles known variously as "bessbugs", "bess beetles", "betsy beetles", "betsy bugs", or "horned passalus beetles". Nearly all of the approximately 500 species are tropical; species found in North America are notable for their size, ranging from 20 to 43 mm, for having a single "horn" on the head, and for a form of social behavior unusual among beetles.

Bodies are elongate-cylindrical and black overall; ventral surfaces may be covered with yellow setae. The head is narrower than the thorax, with antennae consisting of 10 antennomeres with a three-segment club. The elytra are elongate with parallel sides, and heavily striated.

They are quasisocial (common nest + brood caring) beetles that live in groups within rotting logs or stumps. The beetles will excavate tunnel systems within rotting wood where the females then lay their eggs. They care for their young by preparing food for them and helping the larvae construct the pupal case. Both adults and larvae must consume adult feces which have been further digested by microflora for a time; an arrangement that might be described as a sort of external rumen.

They are also able to produce fourteen acoustical signals, more than many vertebrates. Adults produce the sounds by rubbing the upper surface of the abdomen against the hind wings. The larvae produce the sounds by rubbing the third leg against a striated area on the coxa of the second leg.

While the taxonomy of Nearctic species is well-known (four species in the US, and 90 in Mexico), bess beetles in other parts of the world need further study.

Of North American species, Odontotaenius disjunctus (synonym: Popilius disjunctus) is the familiar bessbug found throughout the eastern US and Canada, while O. floridanus has only been found in Florida on sand hills that used to be islands when Florida was flooded thousands of years ago. Ptichopus angulatus was recently discovered near the border of Mexico in Arizona. Its habitat is south to Colombia and it is commonly associated with the detritus chambers of leafcutter ant nests (Atta spp.). Two other species were reported from Arizona at the beginning of the 20th century, but have not been seen there since that time; they may have been brought from Mexico by a train hauling firewood.

The oldest records of the family go back to the Cretaceous, with the genus Ceracyclus known from two species found in the Cenomanian aged Burmese amber; the genus appears to be closely related to the living genus Cylindrocaulus. The family has been suggested to have a close relationship with the extinct family Passalopalpidae.

== Genera ==
- Aceraius – Analaches – Aponelides – Aulacocyclus – Austropassalus – Basilianus – Cacoius – Ceracupes – Cetejus – Cicernonius – Comacupes – Cylindrocaulus – Didimus – Epishenus – Episphenoides – Eumelosomus – Flaminius – Gonatas – Heliscus – Hincksius – Labienus – Leptaulax – Macrolinus – Malagasulus – Mastochilus – Neleides – Neleuops – Nelues – Ninus – Odontotaenius – Ogyges – Oileus – Ophrygonius – Orgyes – Paratiberioides – Passalus – Passipassalus – Paxillus – Pelopides – Pelops – Pentalobus – Petrejoides – Petrejus – Pharochilus – Phoroneus – Plesthenus – Pleurarius – Popilius – Proculejus – Proculus – Protomocoelus – Pseudepisphenus – Pseudoarrox – Ptichopus – Publius – Rhodocanthopus – Semicyclus – Solenocyclus – Spasalus – Spurius – Taeniocerus – Tarquinius – Tiberioides – Trichopleurus – Undulifer – Verres – Veturius – Vindex – Vitellinus – Xylopassaloides

== Selected species ==
- Genus Aceraius

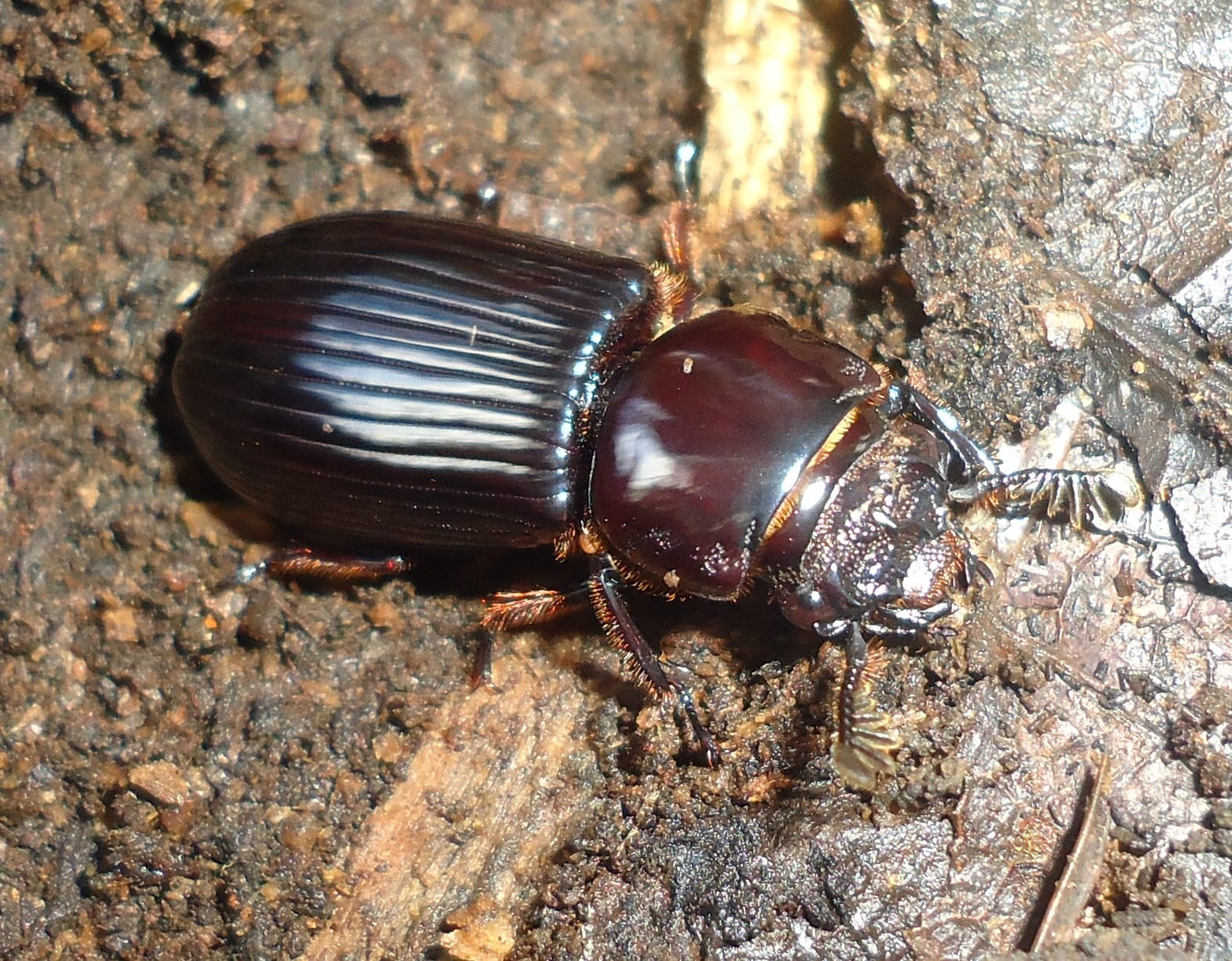
Aceraius laevicollis from under a rotten log in Mindanao, Philippines

Aceraius grandis

- Genus Aulacocyclus

Aulacocyclus edentulus

- Genus Ceracupes

Ceracupes arrowi

- Genus Chondrocephalus

Chondrocephalus debilis
Chondrocephalus granulifrons

- Genus Cylindrocaulus

Cylindrocaulus patalis

- Genus Didimus

Didimus laevis
Didimus parastictus

- Genus Heliscus

Heliscus tropicus

- Genus Leptaulax

Leptaulax bicolor

- Genus Odontotaenius

Odontotaenius disjunctus (patent-leather beetle)
Odontotaenius floridanus
Odontotaenius striatopunctatus

- Genus Ogyges

Ogyges laevior

- Genus Oileus

Oileus rimator

- Genus Passalus

Passalus affinis
Passalus caelatus
Passalus elfriedae
Passalus inops
Passalus interruptus
Passalus interstitialis
Passalus jansoni
Passalus latifrons
Passalus pugionifer
Passalus punctatostriatus
Passalus punctiger
Passalus spiniger
Passalus unicornis

- Genus Paxillus

Paxillus leachi
Paxillus pentataphylloides

- Genus Pentalobus

Pentalobus barbatus

- Genus Petrejoides

Petrejoides orizabae

- Genus Popilius

Popilius eclipticus

- Genus Proculus

Proculus burmeisteri
Proculus mniszechi

- Genus Ptichopus

Ptichopus angulatus

- Genus Publius

Publius agassizi

- Genus Spasalus

Spasalus crenatus

- Genus Spurius

Spurius bicornis

- Genus Verres

Verres corticicola
Verres hageni

- Genus Veturius

Veturius transversus

== See also ==
- Austroplatypus incompertus, an unrelated species that also lives in wood and shows sociality
