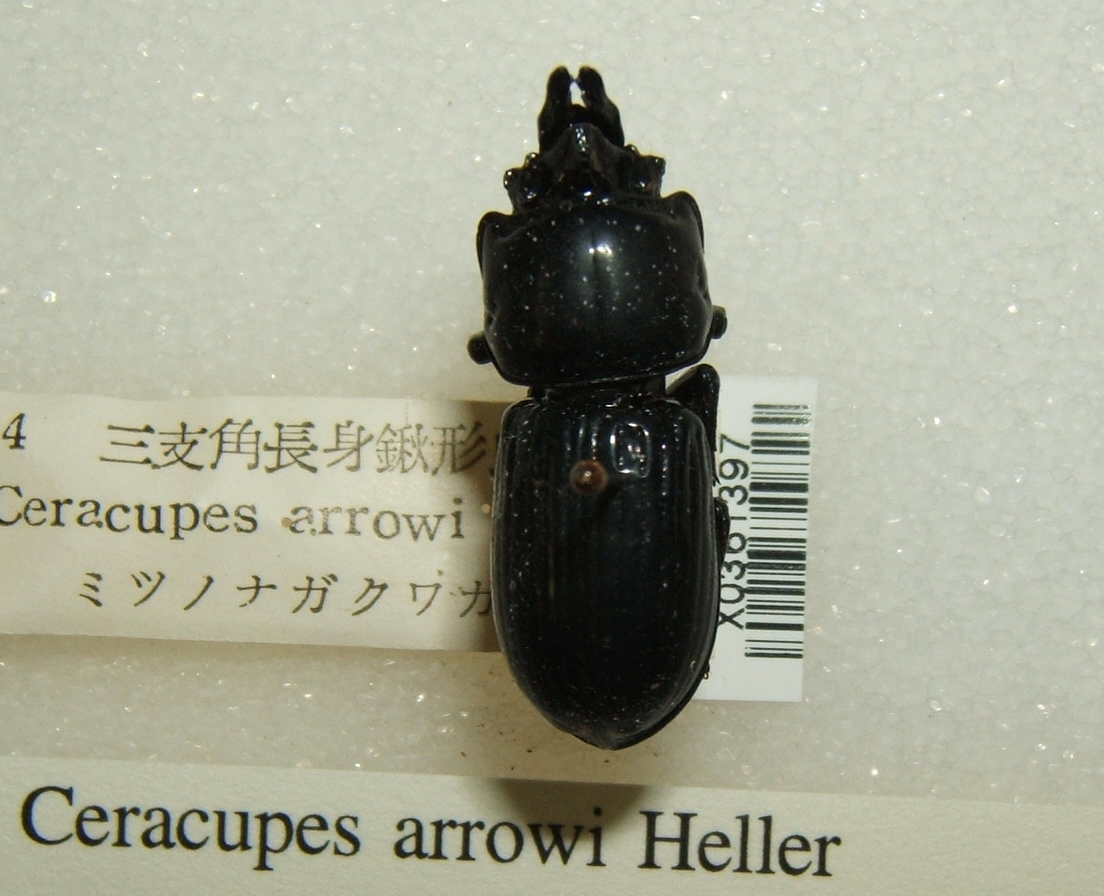
- Ceracupes arrowi, adult

Scientific classification
- Kingdom: Animalia
- Phylum: Arthropoda
- Class: Insecta
- Order: Coleoptera
- Suborder: Polyphaga
- Infraorder: Scarabaeiformia
- Family: Passalidae
- Genus: Ceracupes
- Species: C. arrowi

Binomial name
- Ceracupes arrowi Heller, 1911

= Ceracupes arrowi =

Species of beetle

Ceracupes arrowi is a beetle of the family Passalidae. It is found in Taiwan.
