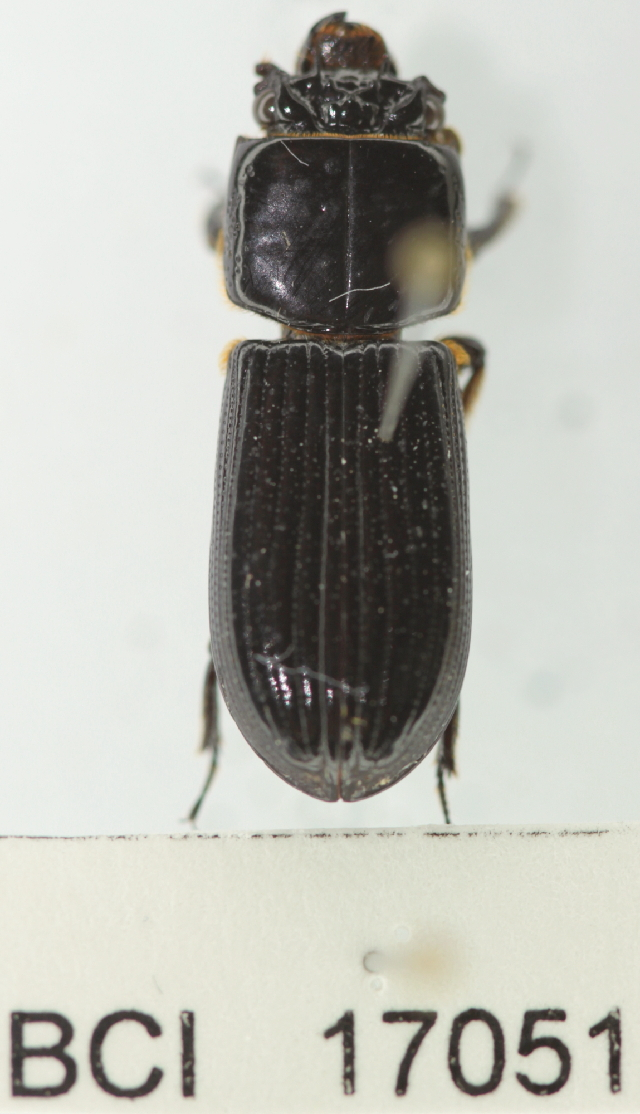

Scientific classification
- Kingdom: Animalia
- Phylum: Arthropoda
- Class: Insecta
- Order: Coleoptera
- Suborder: Polyphaga
- Infraorder: Scarabaeiformia
- Family: Passalidae
- Genus: Paxillus
- Species: P. leachi

Binomial name
- Paxillus leachi MacLeay, 1819

= Paxillus leachi =

Species of beetle

Paxillus leachi is a species of beetle in the family Passalidae. It is found in Brazil.
