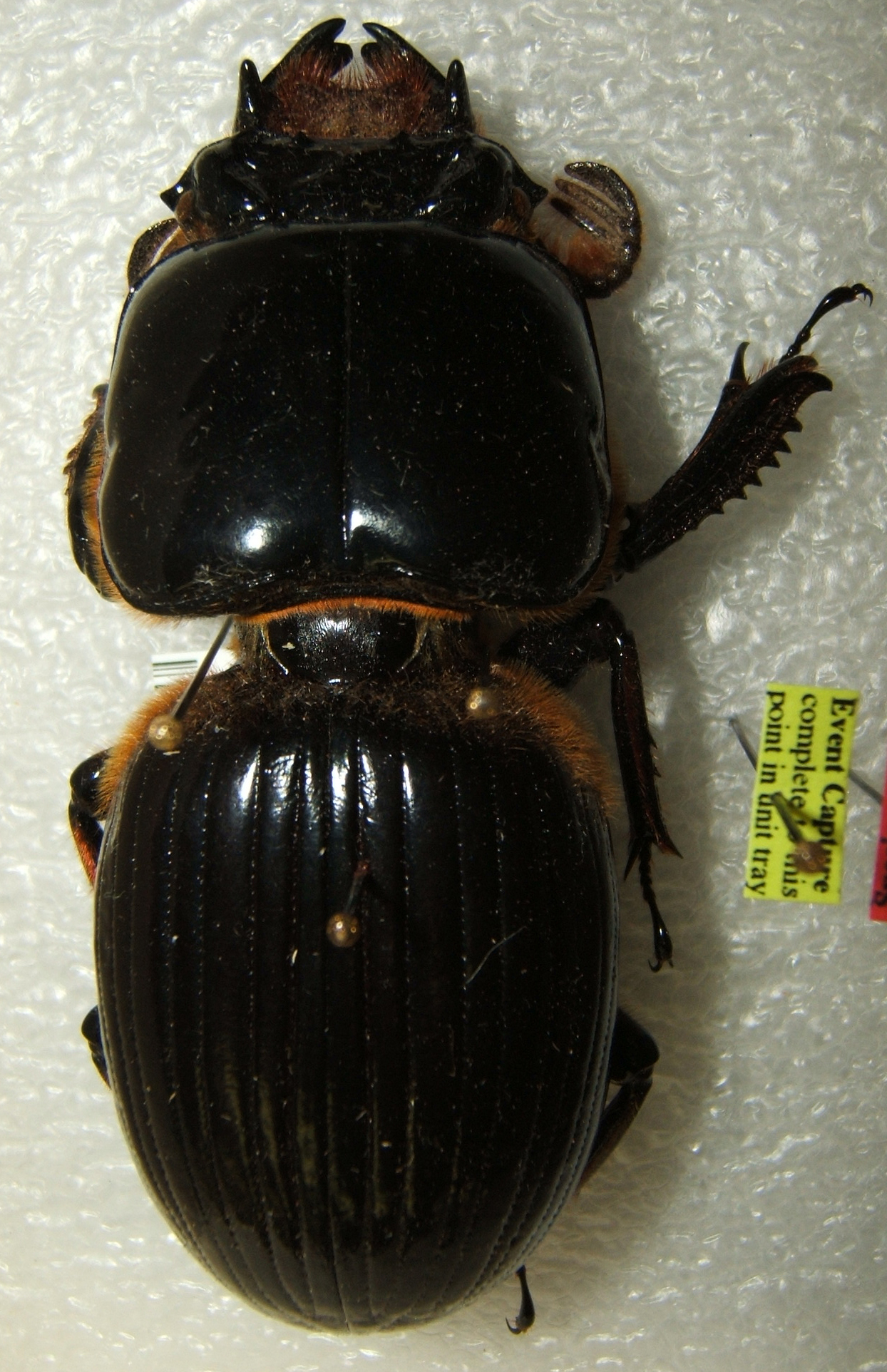
- Proculus burmeisteri, adult

Scientific classification
- Kingdom: Animalia
- Phylum: Arthropoda
- Clade: Pancrustacea
- Class: Insecta
- Order: Coleoptera
- Suborder: Polyphaga
- Infraorder: Scarabaeiformia
- Family: Passalidae
- Genus: Proculus
- Species: P. burmeisteri

Binomial name
- Proculus burmeisteri Kuwert, 1891

= Proculus burmeisteri =

Species of beetle

Proculus burmeisteri is a beetle in the family Passalidae.
