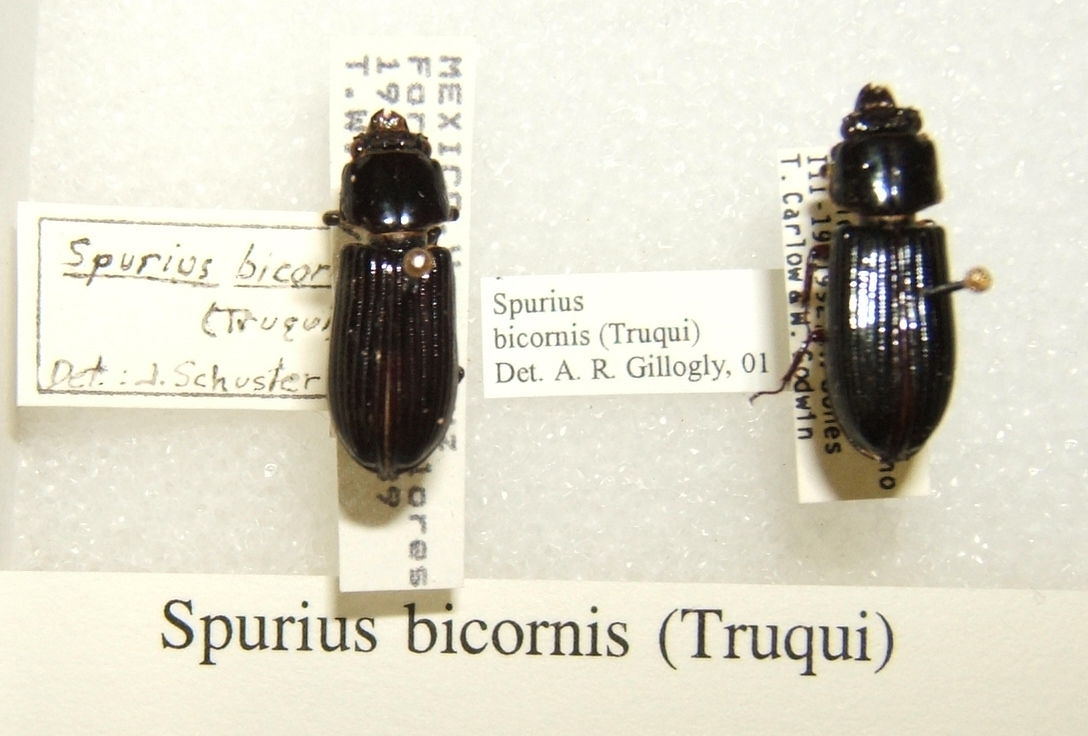
- Spurius bicornis, adult

Scientific classification
- Domain: Eukaryota
- Kingdom: Animalia
- Phylum: Arthropoda
- Class: Insecta
- Order: Coleoptera
- Suborder: Polyphaga
- Infraorder: Scarabaeiformia
- Family: Passalidae
- Genus: Spurius
- Species: S. bicornis

Binomial name
- Spurius bicornis (Truqui, 1857)

= Spurius bicornis =

Species of beetle

Spurius bicornis is a beetle of the family Passalidae. It is found in Mexico and Central America (Belize, Guatemala, and Panama).
