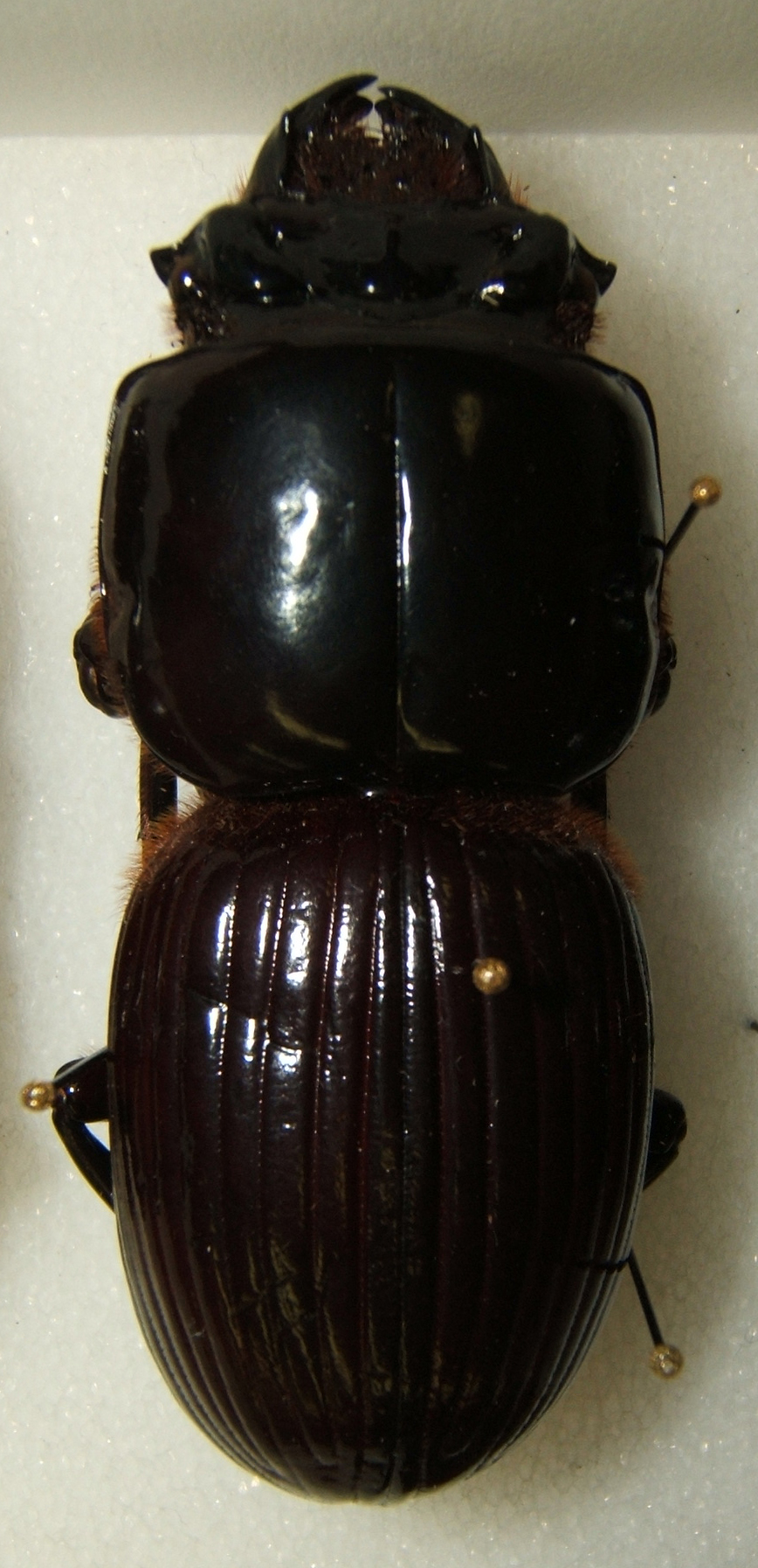
- Proculus mniszechi, adult

Scientific classification
- Kingdom: Animalia
- Phylum: Arthropoda
- Clade: Pancrustacea
- Class: Insecta
- Order: Coleoptera
- Suborder: Polyphaga
- Infraorder: Scarabaeiformia
- Family: Passalidae
- Genus: Proculus
- Species: P. mniszechi

Binomial name
- Proculus mniszechi Kaup

= Proculus mniszechi =

Species of beetle

Proculus mniszechi is a beetle of the family Passalidae.

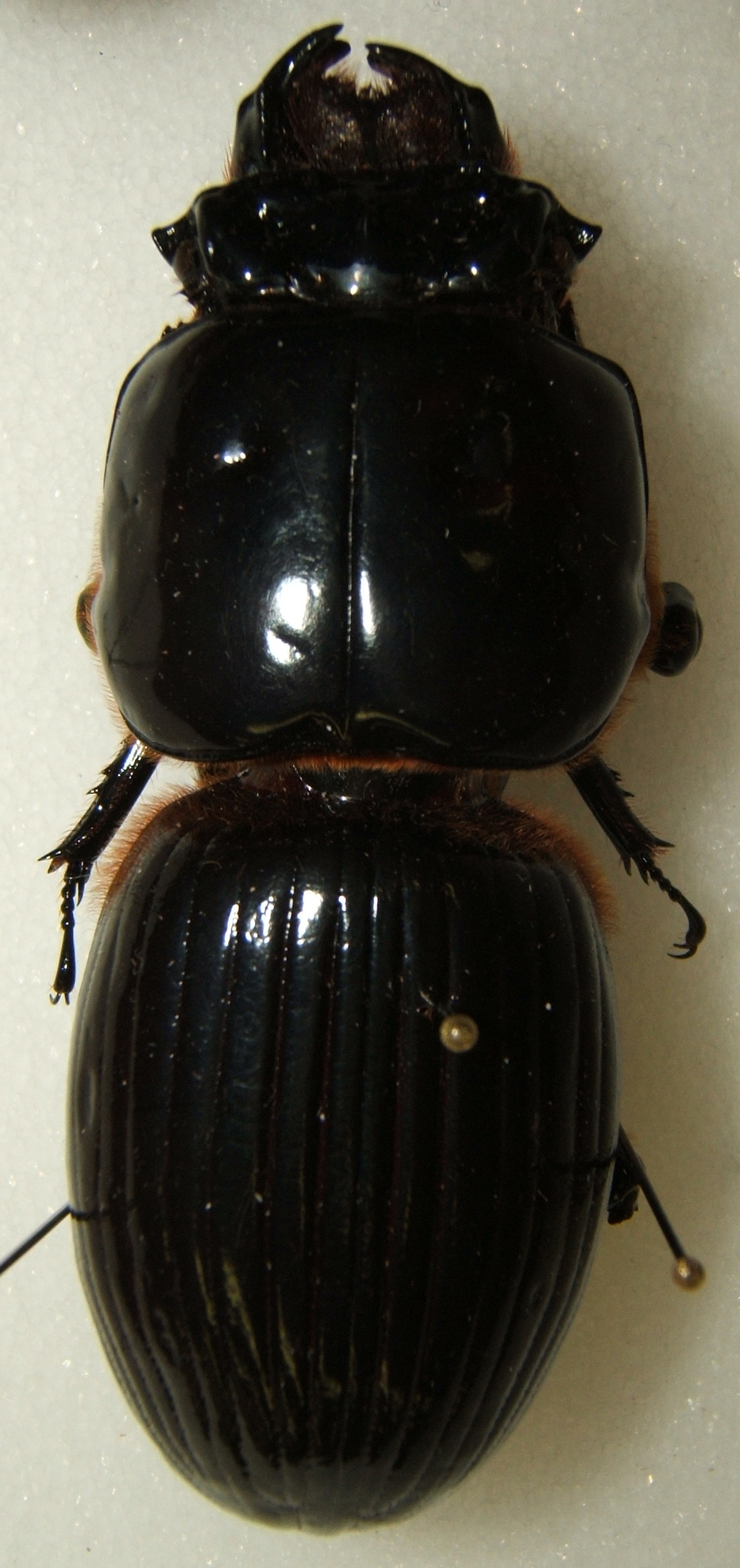

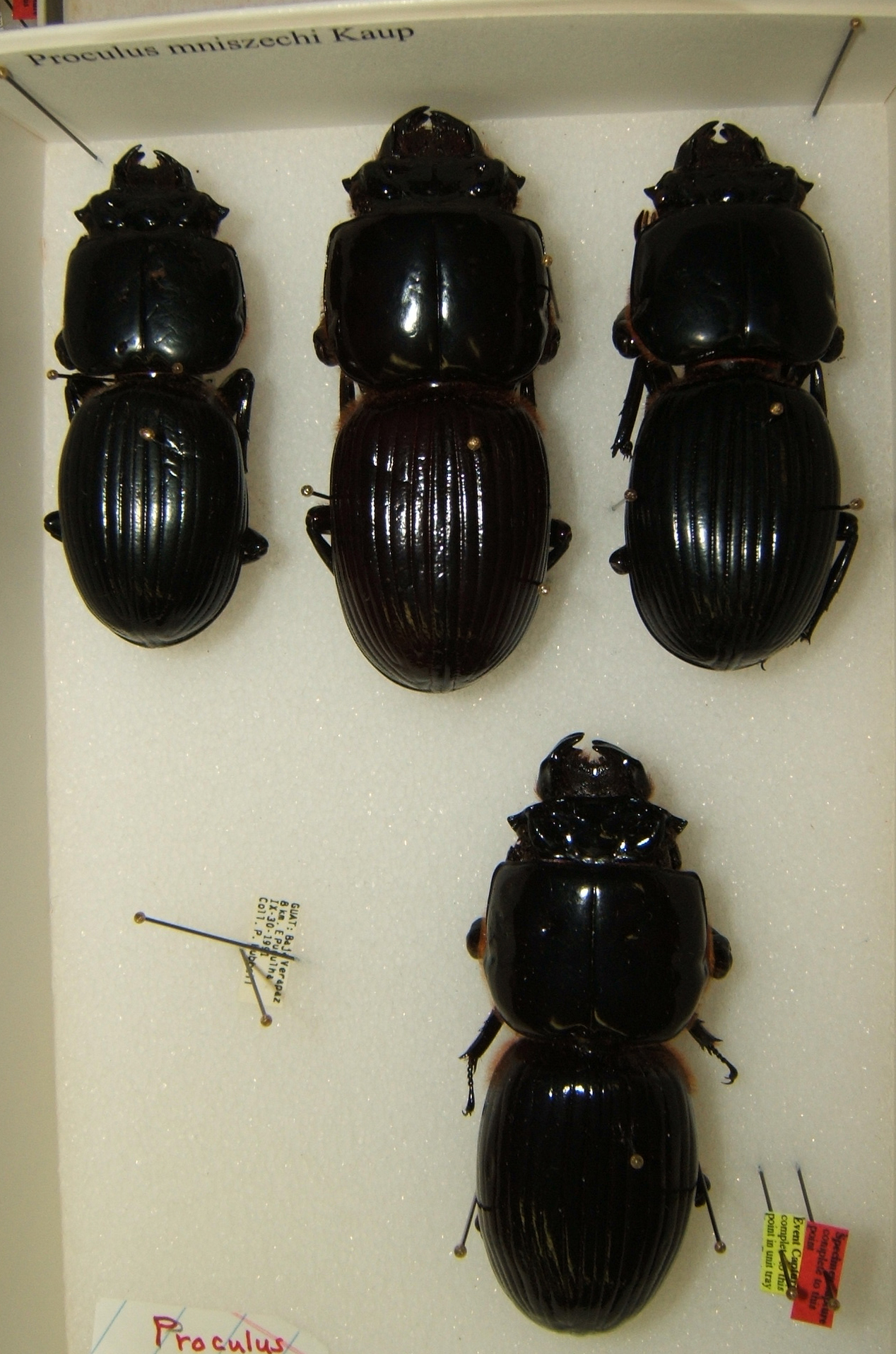
Specimen collection
