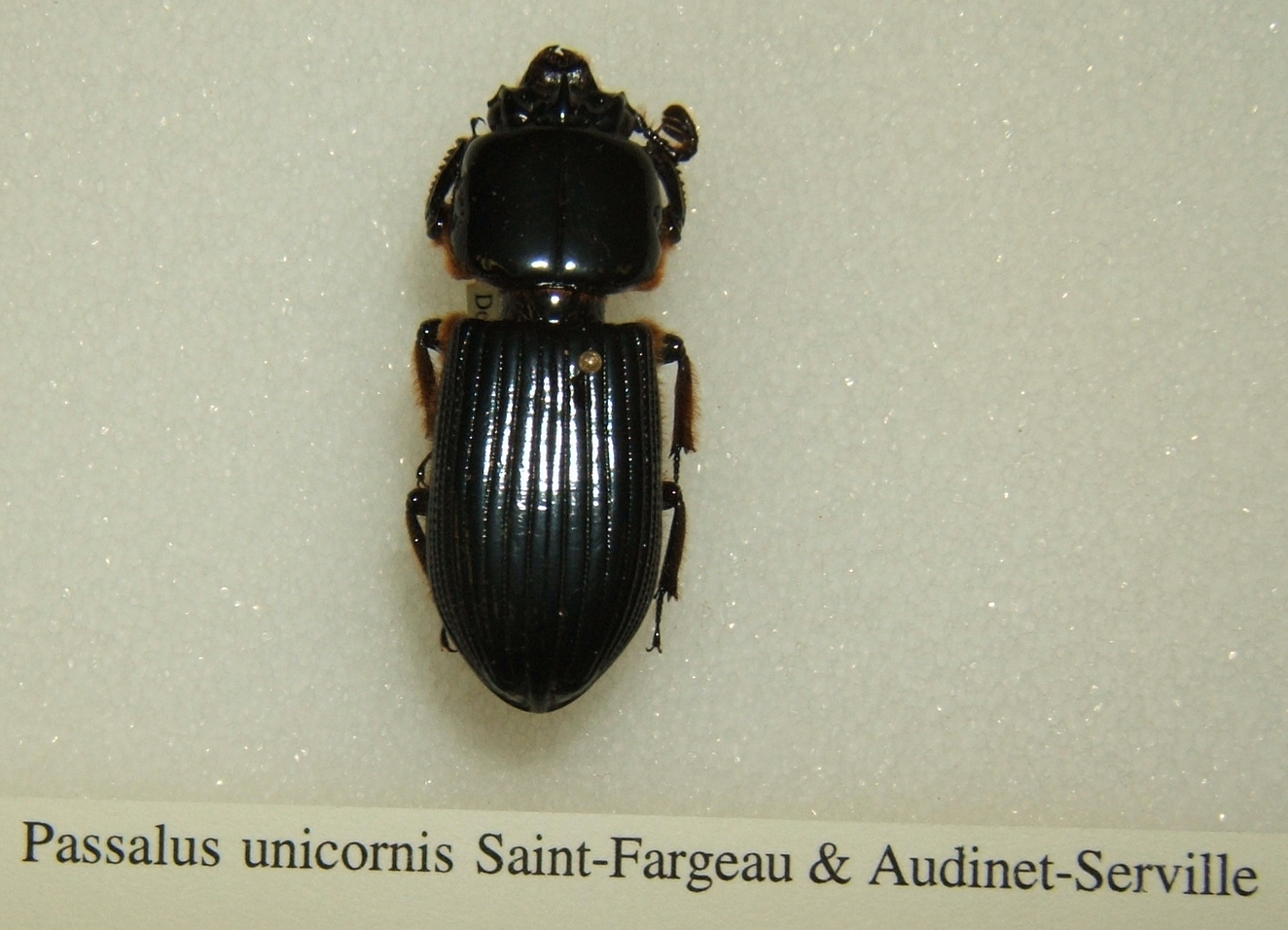
- Passalus unicornis, adult

Scientific classification
- Kingdom: Animalia
- Phylum: Arthropoda
- Class: Insecta
- Order: Coleoptera
- Suborder: Polyphaga
- Infraorder: Scarabaeiformia
- Family: Passalidae
- Genus: Passalus
- Species: P. unicornis

Binomial name
- Passalus unicornis Saint-Fargeau & Audinet-Serville

= Passalus unicornis =

Species of beetle

Passalus unicornis is a beetle of the family Passalidae.

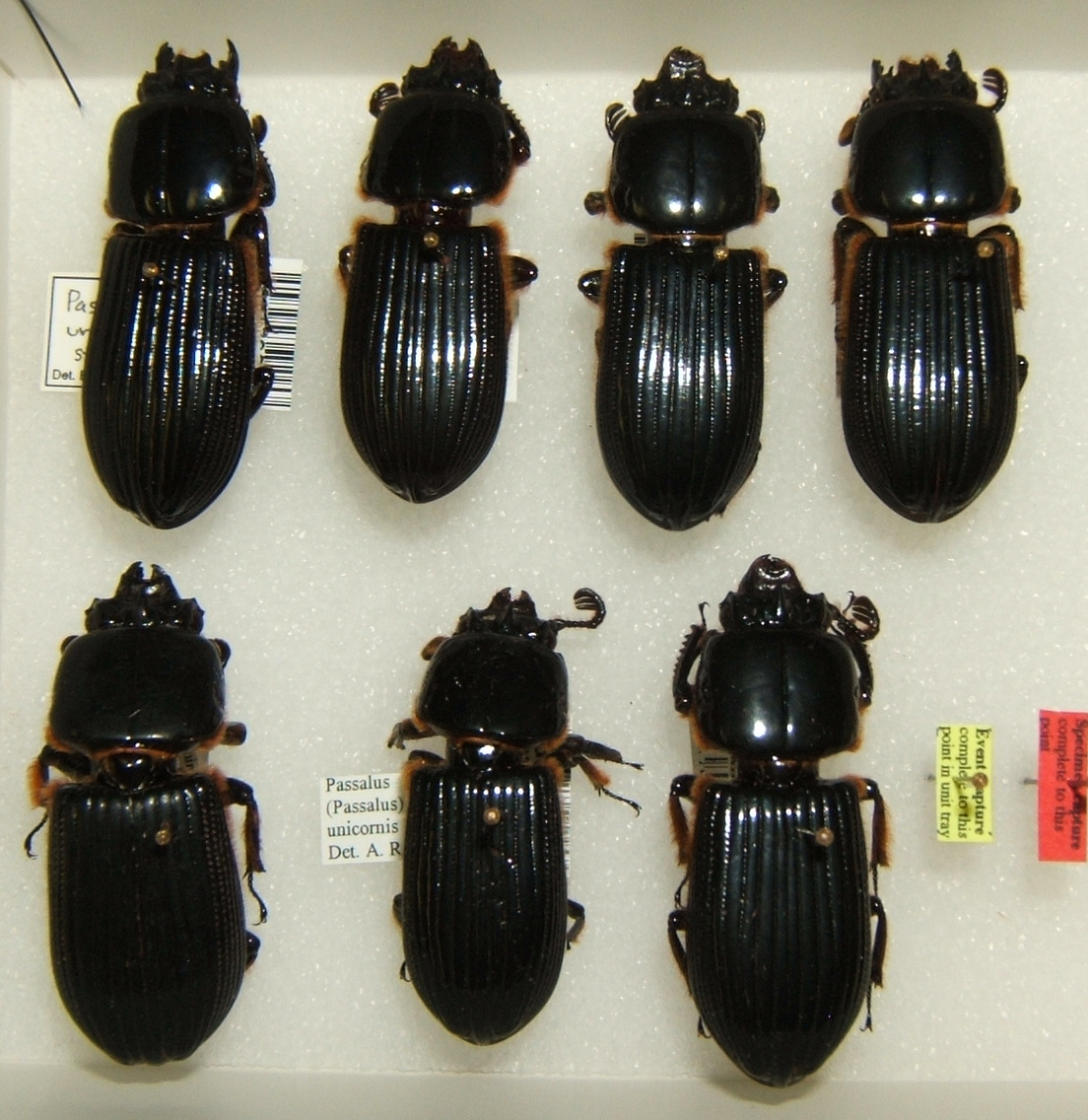
Specimen collection
