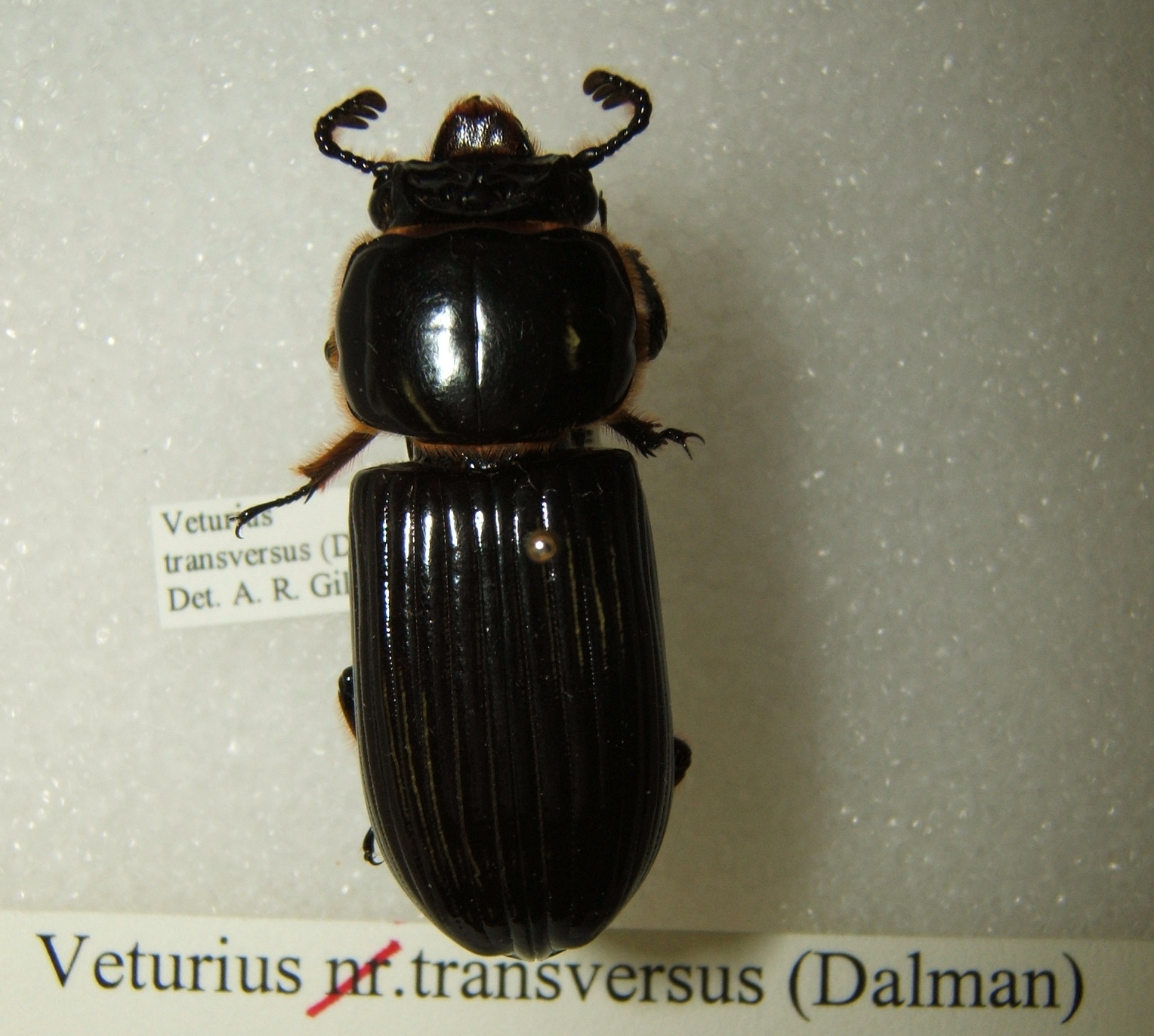
- Veturius transversus, adult

Scientific classification
- Kingdom: Animalia
- Phylum: Arthropoda
- Clade: Pancrustacea
- Class: Insecta
- Order: Coleoptera
- Suborder: Polyphaga
- Infraorder: Scarabaeiformia
- Family: Passalidae
- Genus: Veturius
- Species: V. transversus

Binomial name
- Veturius transversus (Dalman, 1817)

= Veturius transversus =

Species of beetle

Veturius transversus is a beetle of the family Passalidae.
