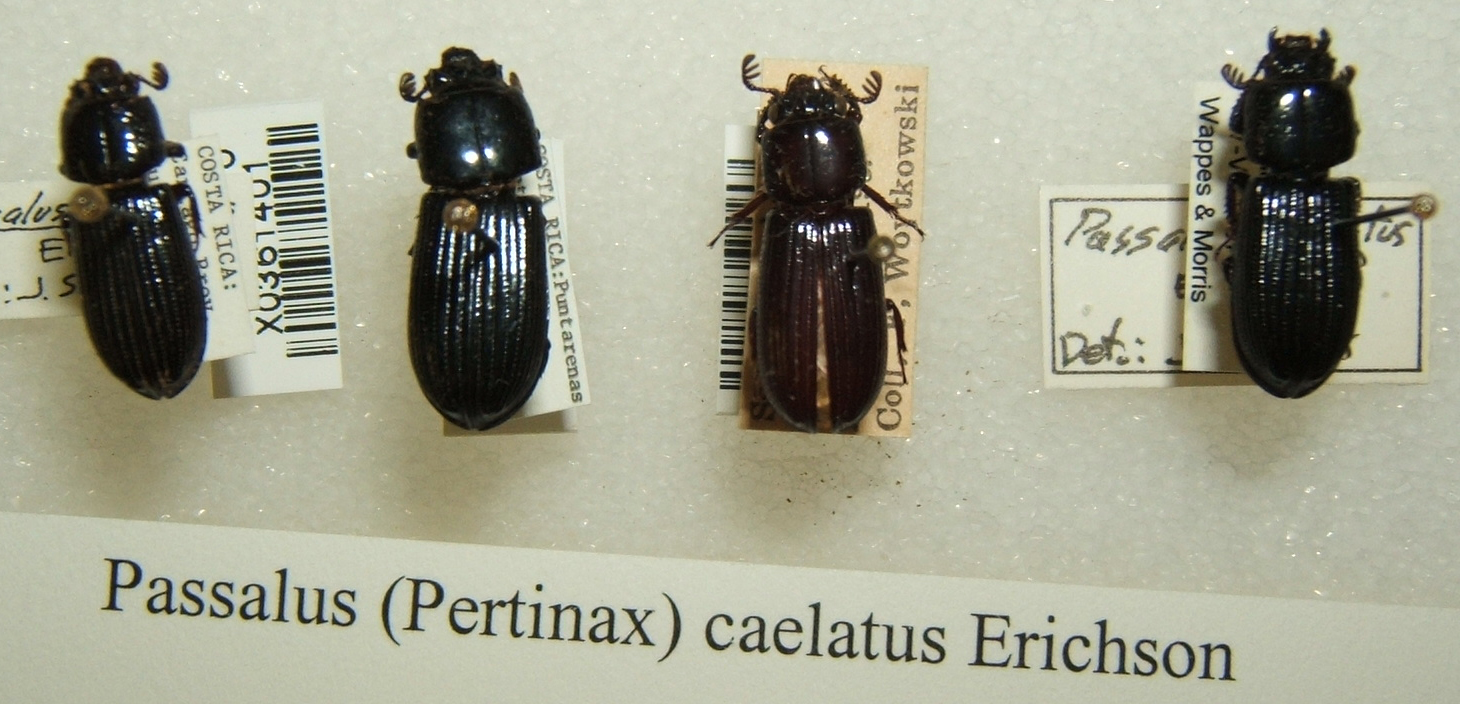
- Passalus caelatus, adult

Scientific classification
- Kingdom: Animalia
- Phylum: Arthropoda
- Class: Insecta
- Order: Coleoptera
- Suborder: Polyphaga
- Infraorder: Scarabaeiformia
- Family: Passalidae
- Genus: Passalus
- Species: P. caelatus

Binomial name
- Passalus caelatus Erichson, 1847

= Passalus caelatus =

Species of beetle

Passalus caelatus is a beetle of the family Passalidae.
