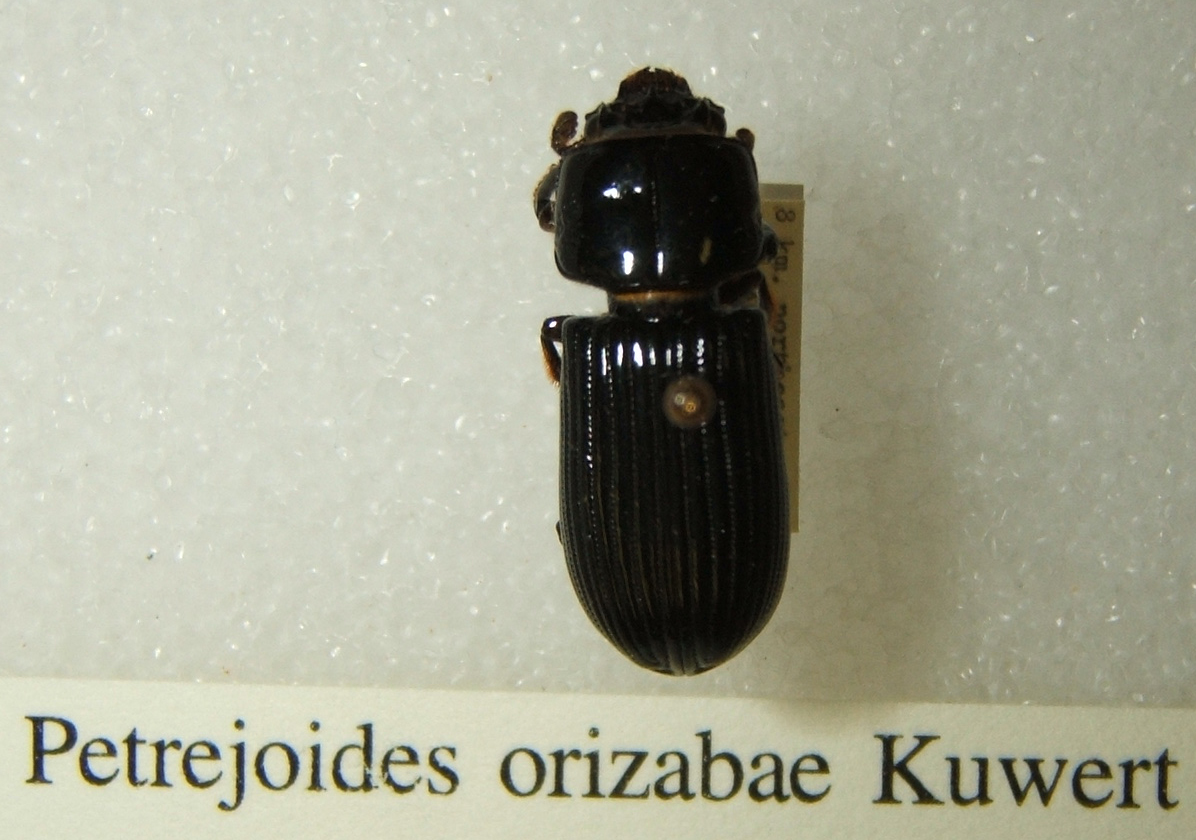
- Petrejoides orizabae, adult

Scientific classification
- Kingdom: Animalia
- Phylum: Arthropoda
- Class: Insecta
- Order: Coleoptera
- Suborder: Polyphaga
- Infraorder: Scarabaeiformia
- Family: Passalidae
- Genus: Petrejoides
- Species: P. orizabae

Binomial name
- Petrejoides orizabae Kuwert, 1897

= Petrejoides orizabae =

Species of beetle

Petrejoides orizabae is a beetle of the family Passalidae.

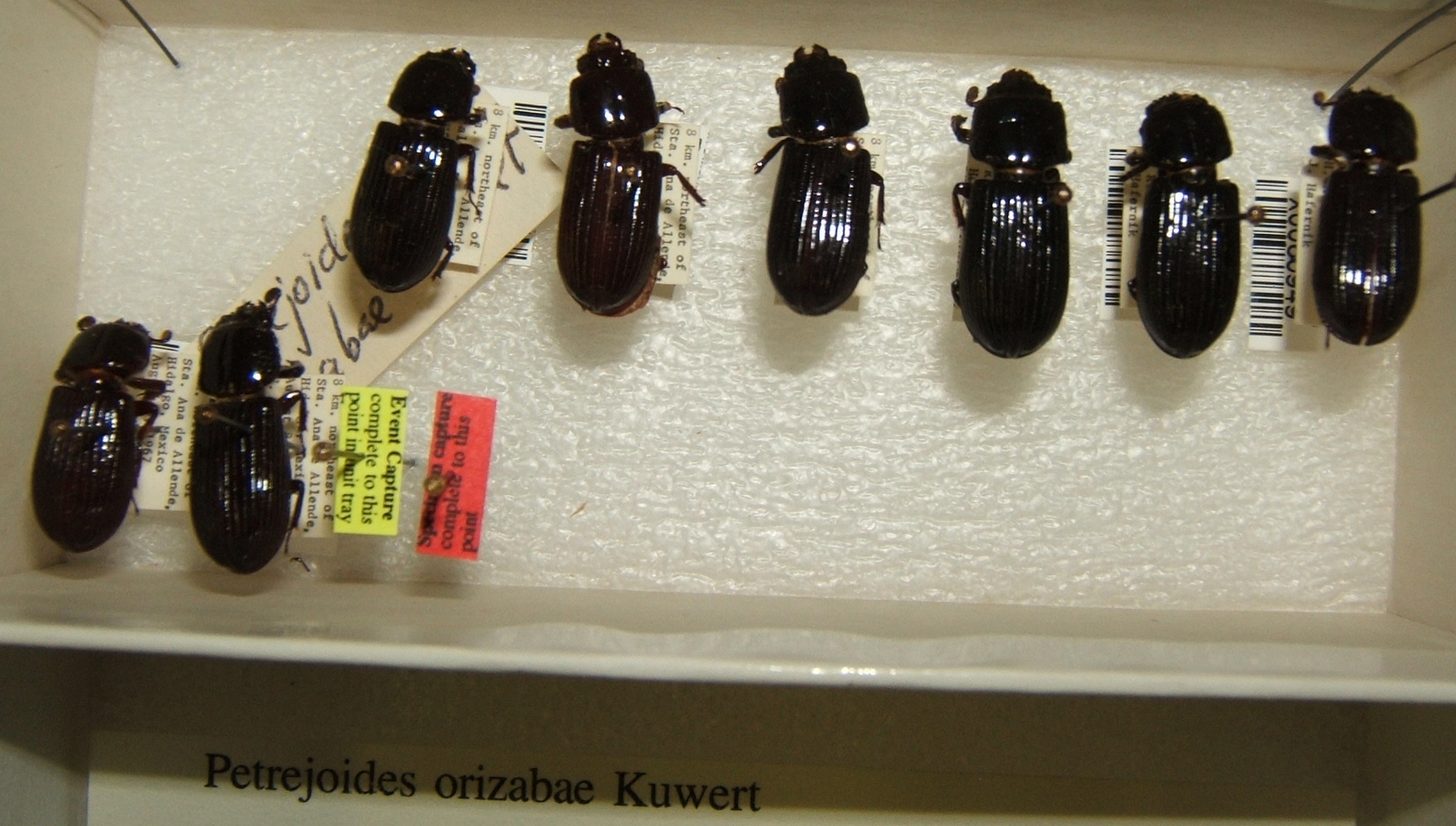
Specimen collection
