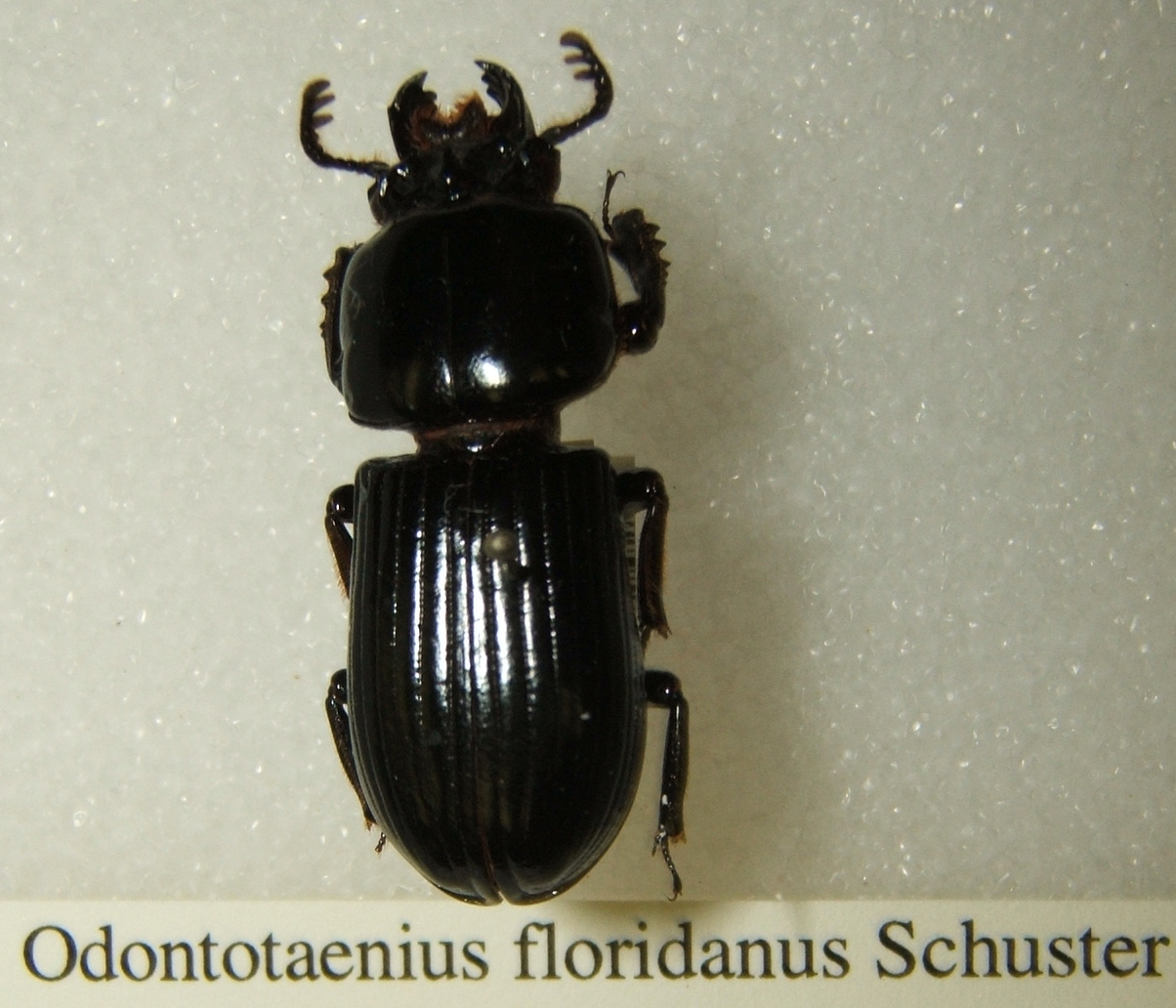
- Odontotaenius floridanus, adult

Conservation status
- Critically Imperiled (NatureServe)

Scientific classification
- Kingdom: Animalia
- Phylum: Arthropoda
- Class: Insecta
- Order: Coleoptera
- Suborder: Polyphaga
- Infraorder: Scarabaeiformia
- Family: Passalidae
- Genus: Odontotaenius
- Species: O. floridanus

Binomial name
- Odontotaenius floridanus Schuster, 1994

= Odontotaenius floridanus =

Species of beetle

Odontotaenius floridanus, commonly known as the Archbold bess beetle, is a beetle of the family Passalidae. It is endemic to Lake Wales Ridge in Florida.

The intriguing aspect of this species lies in its potential evolution, suggesting that it may have emerged as a distinct population during periods of elevated sea levels, effectively isolating it from its mainland counterparts.

== Description ==
Odontotaenius floridanus adult individuals can range in size from 30 to 40 mm. These beetles have a glossy black body and present golden hair on their legs, antennae and pronotum. A series of 10 to 15 indentations can be seen on the upper abdomen (elytra), while the upper thorax is vertically divided into two equal segments by a deep groove. The antennae are composed of 10 segments, the three distal ones forming a structure defined as a "lamellated club". The single horn is situated between the eyes and points forward. The lifespan of adult Odontotaenius floridanus is up to a year. A distinctive feature of these types of beetles is that they produce a screeching noise when disturbed.

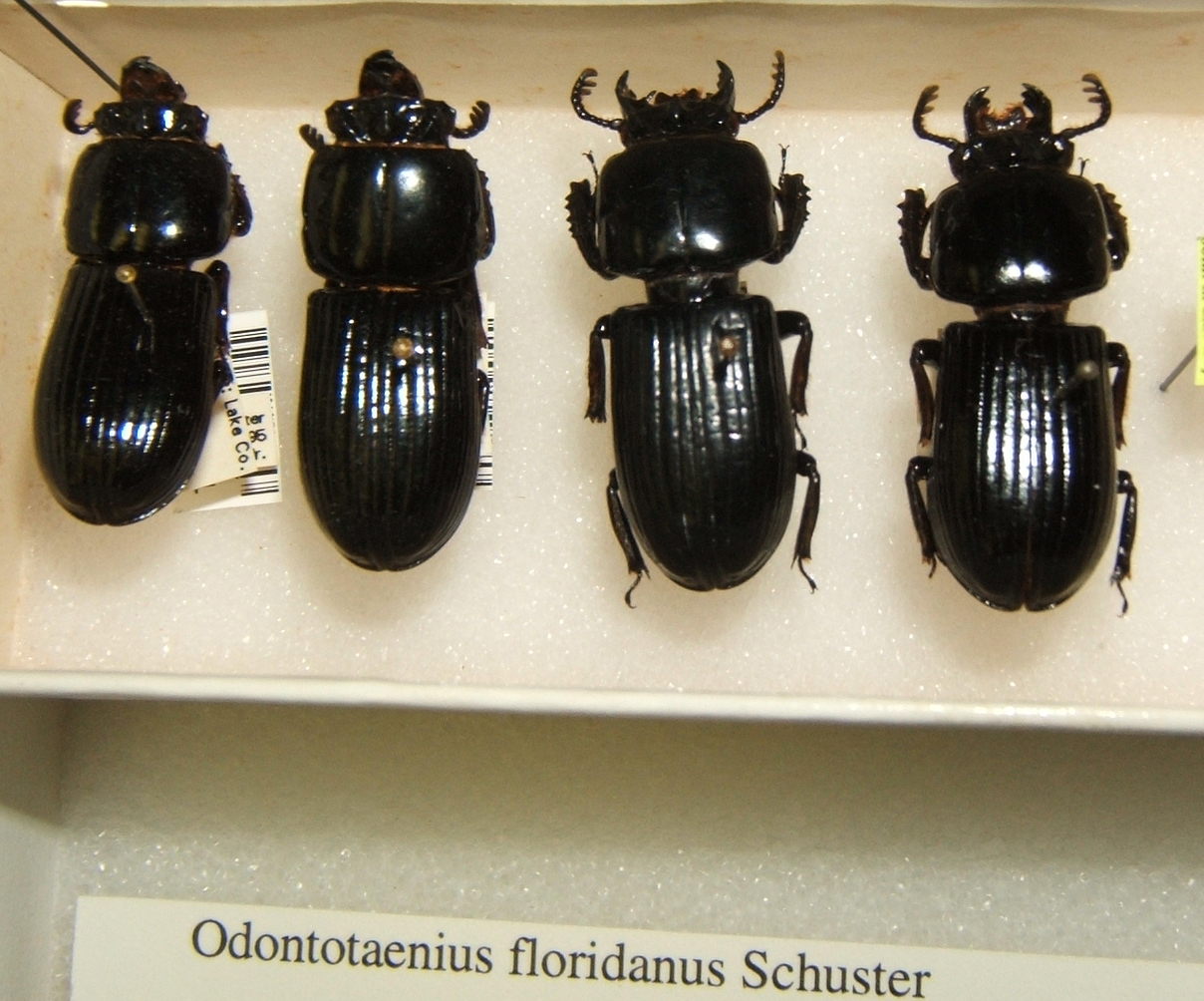
Odontotaenius floridanus variation

== Conservation ==
The Florida scrub and sandhill habitat in which Odontotaenius floridanus resides has been reduced in extent to approximately 12.9% of its area before human settlement and modern development. Information on the status of O. floridanus occurrences is limited.
