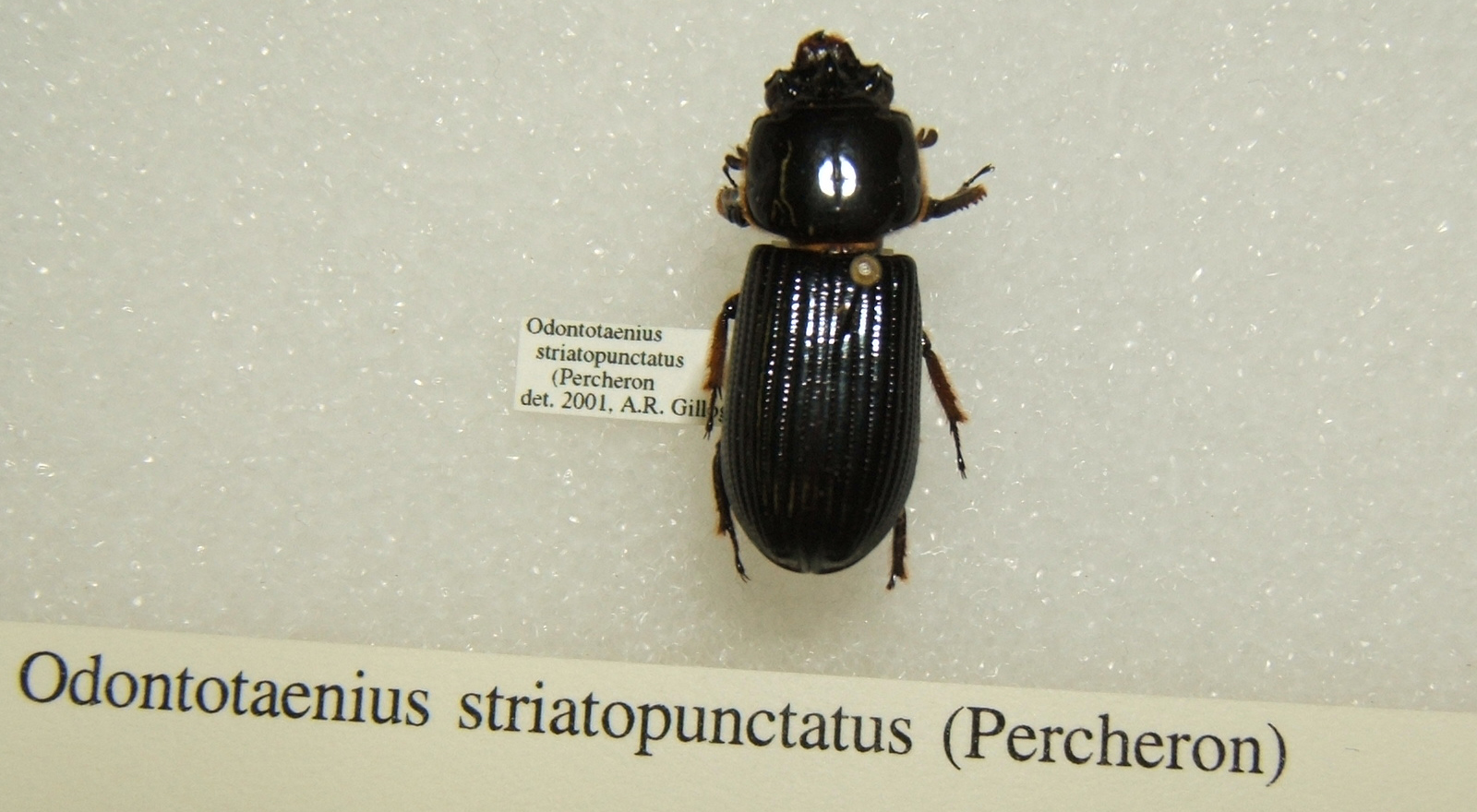
- Odontotaenius striatopunctatus, adult

Scientific classification
- Kingdom: Animalia
- Phylum: Arthropoda
- Class: Insecta
- Order: Coleoptera
- Suborder: Polyphaga
- Infraorder: Scarabaeiformia
- Family: Passalidae
- Genus: Odontotaenius
- Species: O. striatopunctatus

Binomial name
- Odontotaenius striatopunctatus (Percheron 1835)

= Odontotaenius striatopunctatus =

Species of beetle

Odontotaenius striatopunctatus is a beetle of the Family Passalidae. It is found in Latin America. The beetle lives in decaying wood. The species exhibits subsocial behavior, with parental care including pre-digesting food for larvae and repairing cocoons.

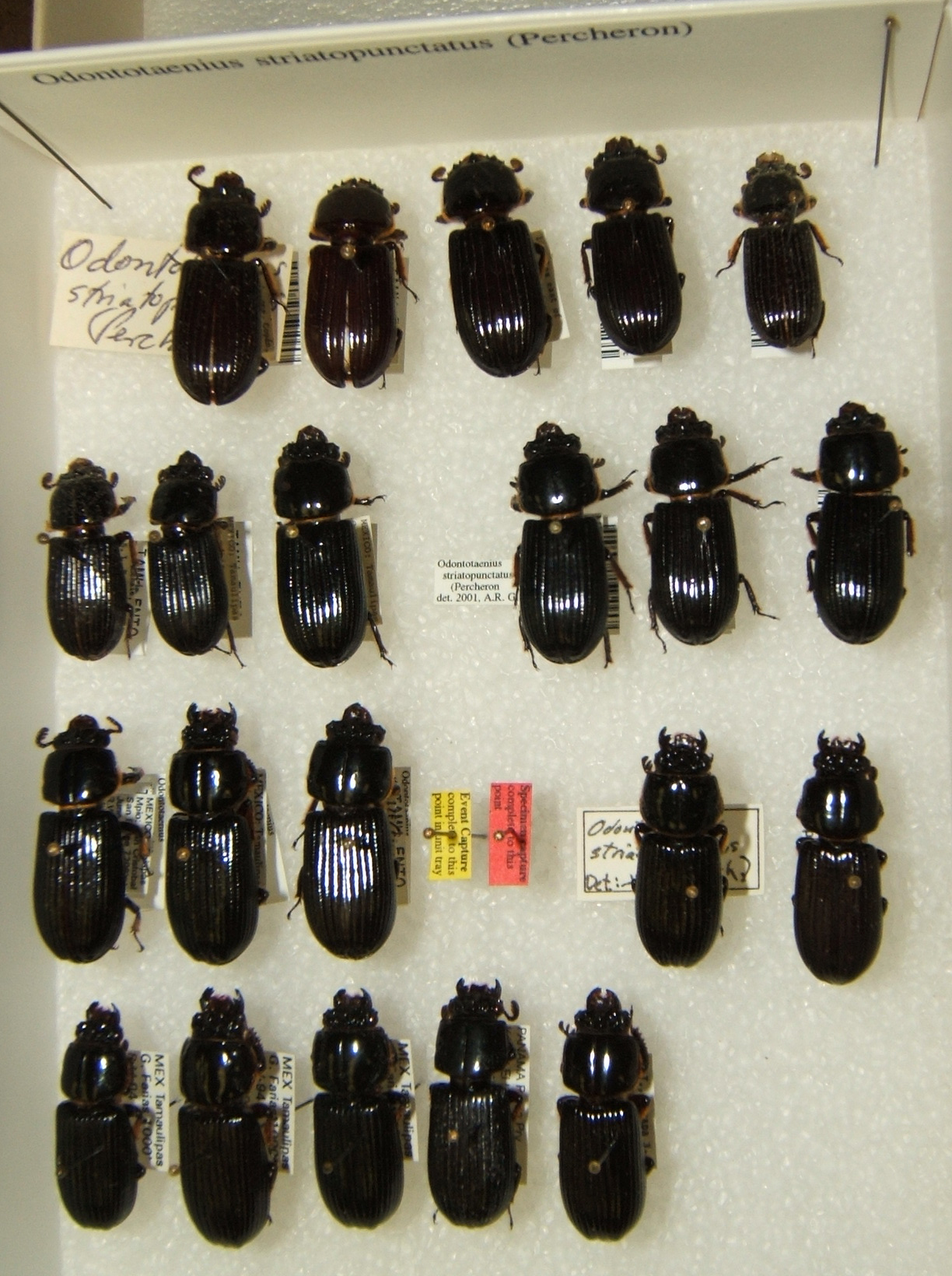
Odontotaenius striatopunctatus variation
