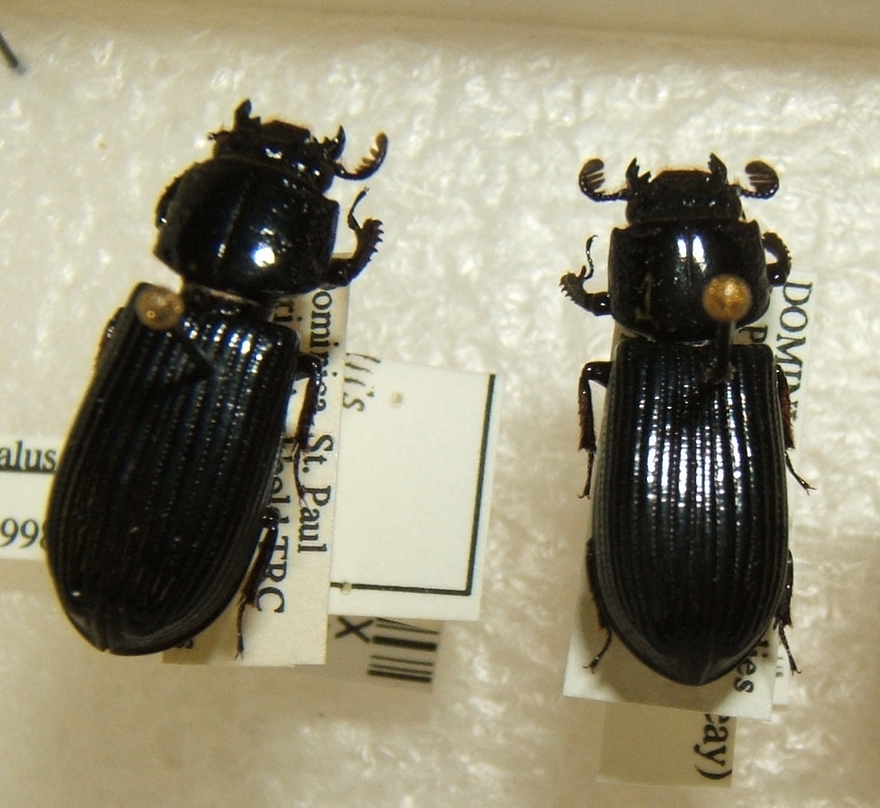
- Spasalus crenatus, adult

Scientific classification
- Kingdom: Animalia
- Phylum: Arthropoda
- Class: Insecta
- Order: Coleoptera
- Suborder: Polyphaga
- Infraorder: Scarabaeiformia
- Family: Passalidae
- Genus: Spasalus
- Species: S. crenatus

Binomial name
- Spasalus crenatus MacLeay, 1819

= Spasalus crenatus =

Species of beetle

Spasalus crenatus is a beetle of the family Passalidae.
