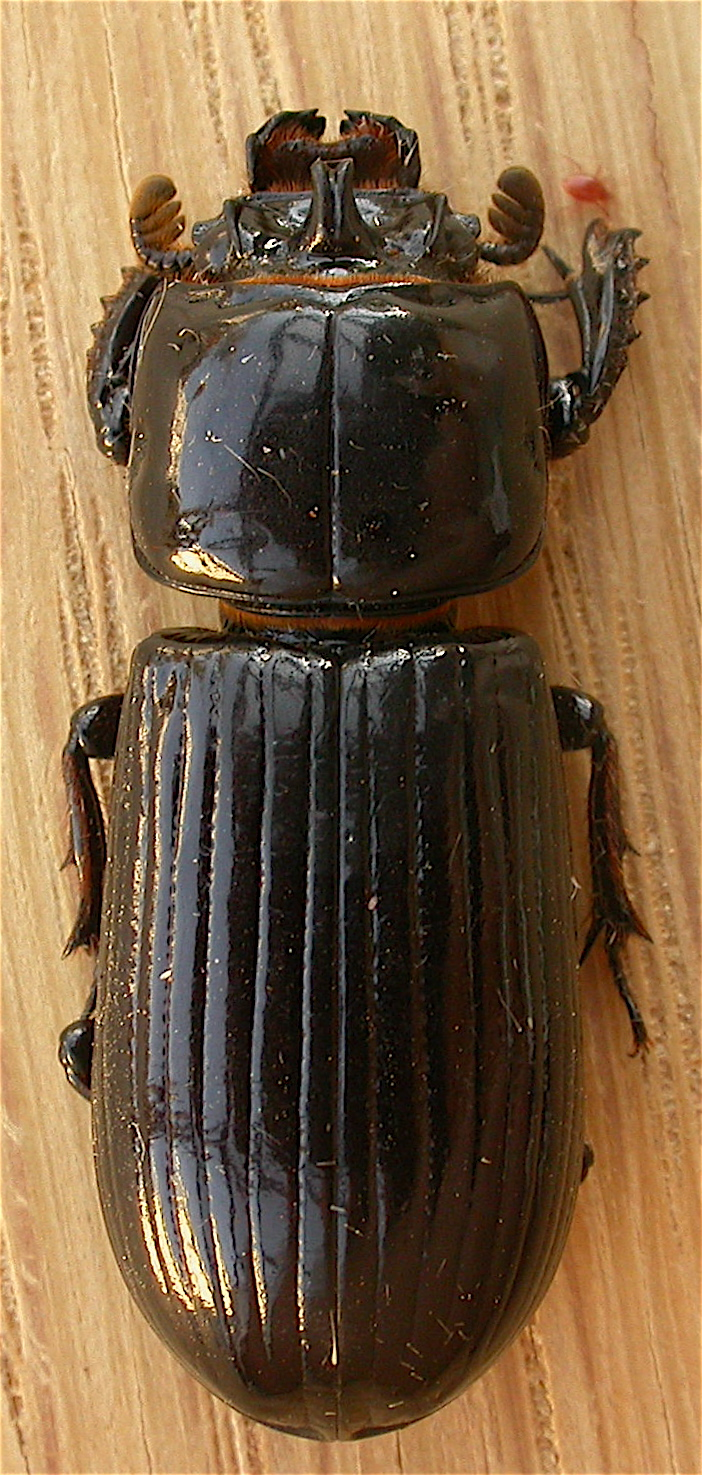
- Dorsal view
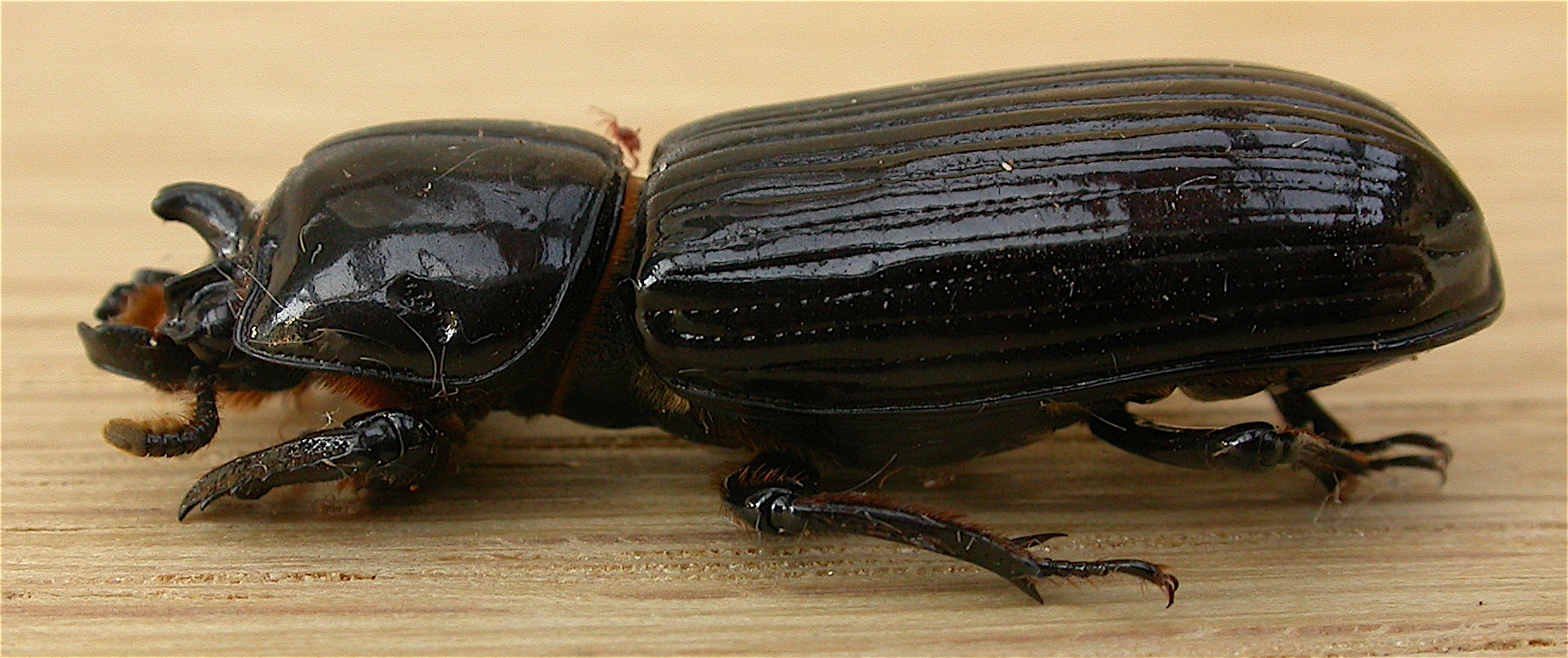
- Ventral view

Scientific classification
- Kingdom: Animalia
- Phylum: Arthropoda
- Class: Insecta
- Order: Coleoptera
- Suborder: Polyphaga
- Infraorder: Scarabaeiformia
- Family: Passalidae
- Genus: Aulacocyclus
- Species: A. edentulus

Binomial name
- Aulacocyclus edentulus (W. S. Macleay, 1826)

= Aulacocyclus edentulus =

Species of beetle

Aulacocyclus edentulus is a beetle of the Passalidae family that occurs in Australia.
