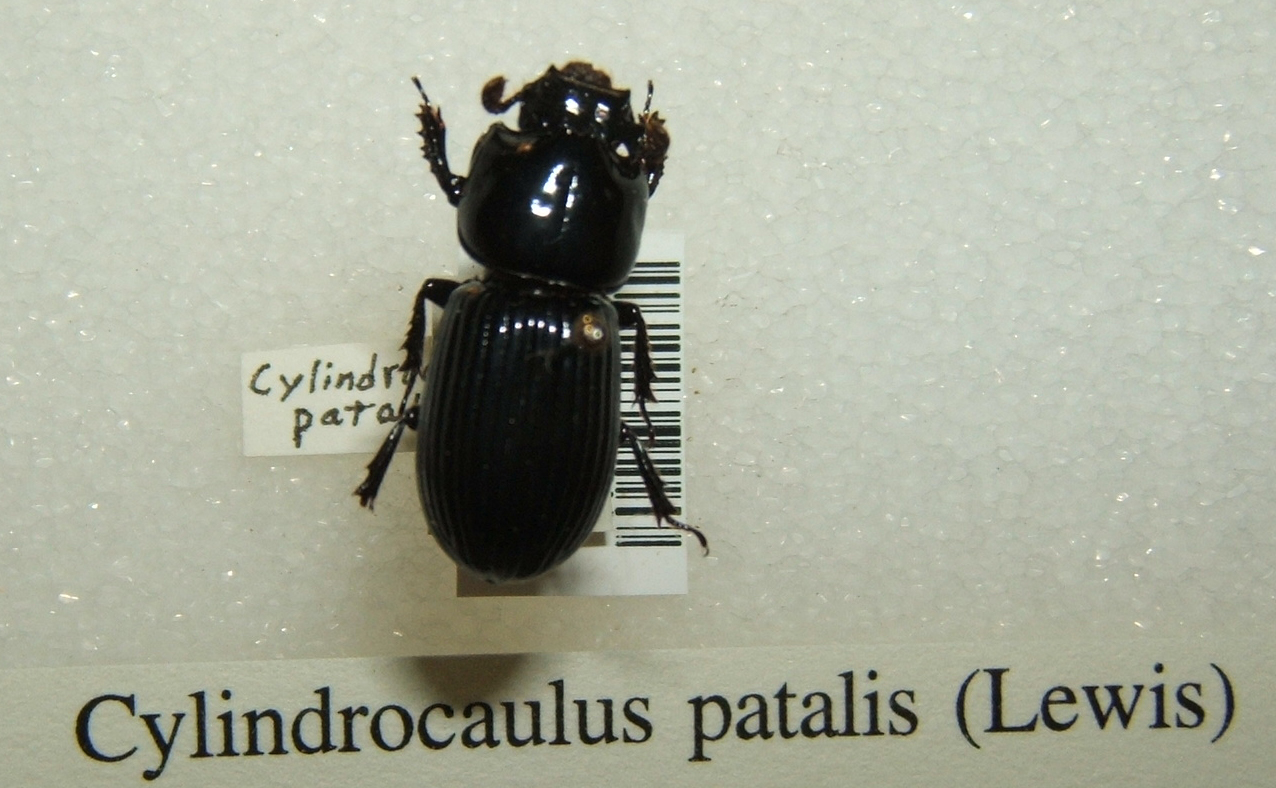
- Cylindrocaulus patalis, adult

Scientific classification
- Kingdom: Animalia
- Phylum: Arthropoda
- Class: Insecta
- Order: Coleoptera
- Suborder: Polyphaga
- Infraorder: Scarabaeiformia
- Family: Passalidae
- Genus: Cylindrocaulus
- Species: C. patalis

Binomial name
- Cylindrocaulus patalis (Lewis, 1883)

= Cylindrocaulus patalis =

Species of beetle

Cylindrocaulus patalis is a beetle of the family Passalidae. It is found in Japan. The larval period is only a month, likely due to parental care. The adults feed on wood.
