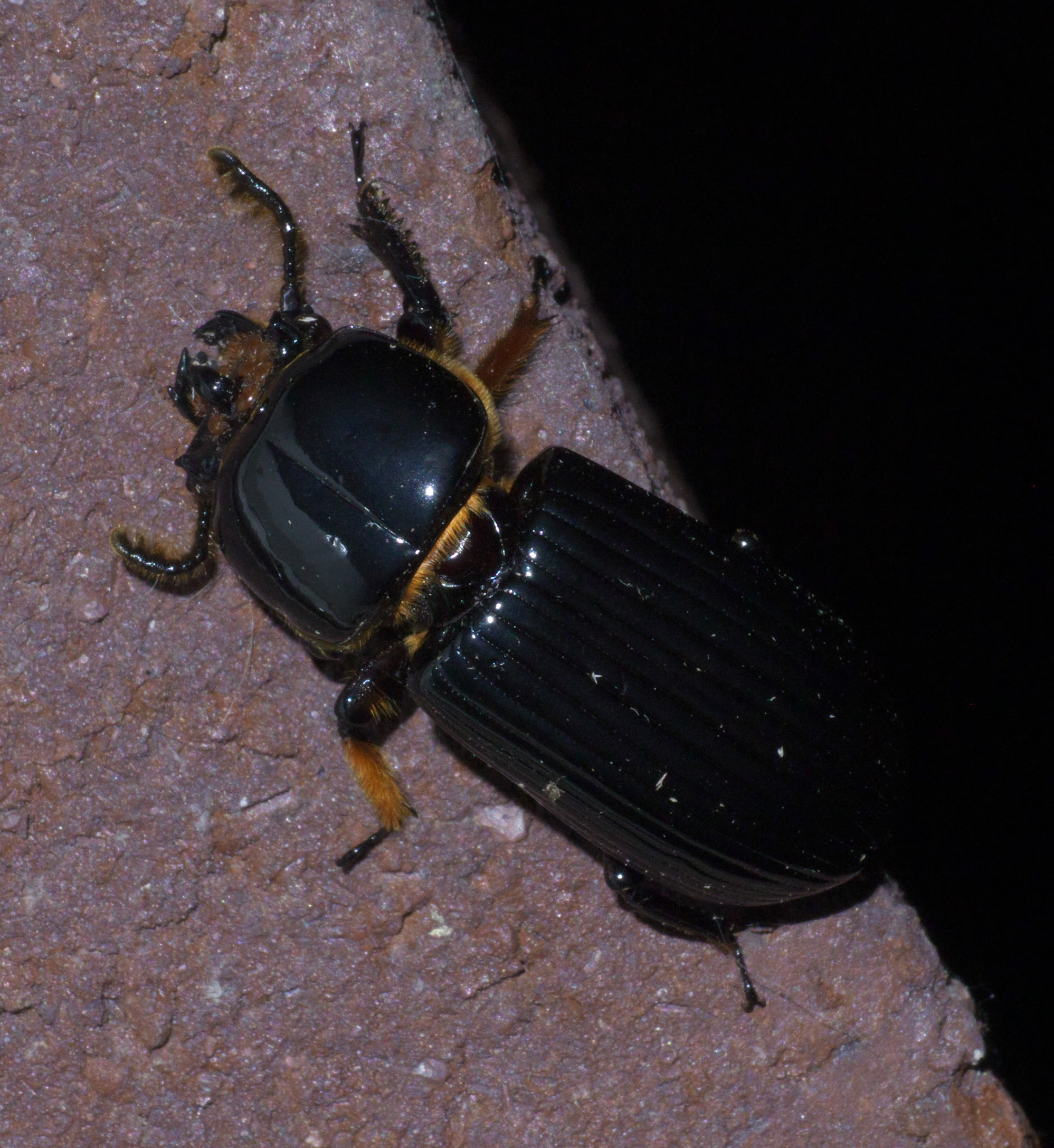
- Odontotaenius disjunctus

Scientific classification
- Domain: Eukaryota
- Kingdom: Animalia
- Phylum: Arthropoda
- Class: Insecta
- Order: Coleoptera
- Suborder: Polyphaga
- Infraorder: Scarabaeiformia
- Family: Passalidae
- Genus: Odontotaenius; Kuwert, 1896

= Odontotaenius =

Genus of beetles

Odontotaenius is a genus of bess beetles in the family Passalidae. There are about 11 described species in Odontotaenius.

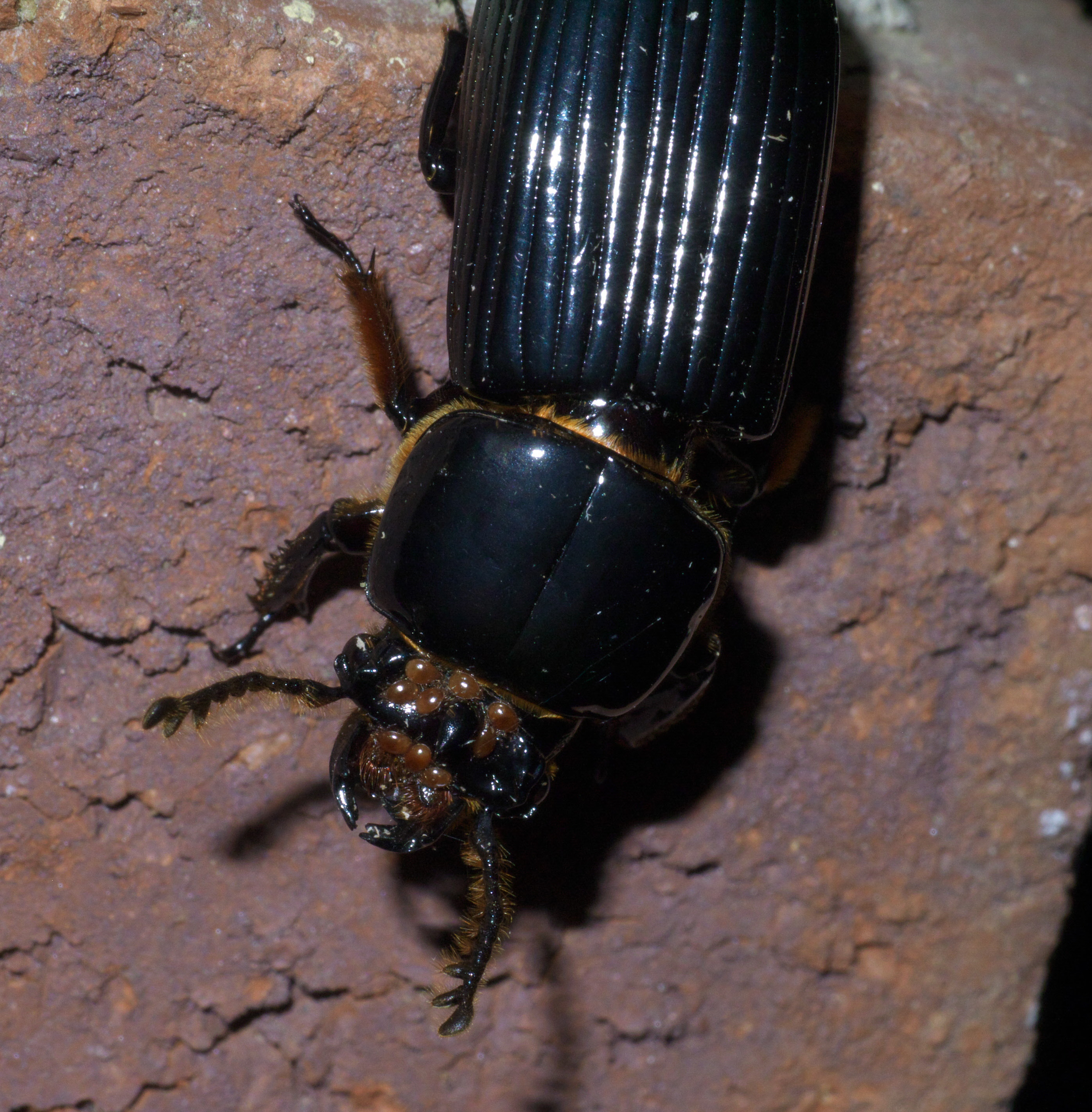
Odontotaenius disjunctus

== Species ==
These 11 species belong to the genus Odontotaenius:

- Odontotaenius brevioripennis (Kuwert, 1891)
- Odontotaenius calimaensis Pardo-Locarno, 2012
- Odontotaenius cerastes Castillo, Rivera-Cervantes & Reyes-Castillo, 1988
- Odontotaenius cuspidatus (Truqui, 1857)
- Odontotaenius disjunctus (Illiger, 1800) (horned passalus)
- Odontotaenius elenae Pardo-Locarno, 2012
- Odontotaenius floridanus Schuster, 1994
- Odontotaenius haberi Kuwert, 1897
- Odontotaenius striatopunctatus (Percheron, 1835)
- Odontotaenius striatulus (Dibb, 1940)
- Odontotaenius zodiacus (Truqui, 1857)
