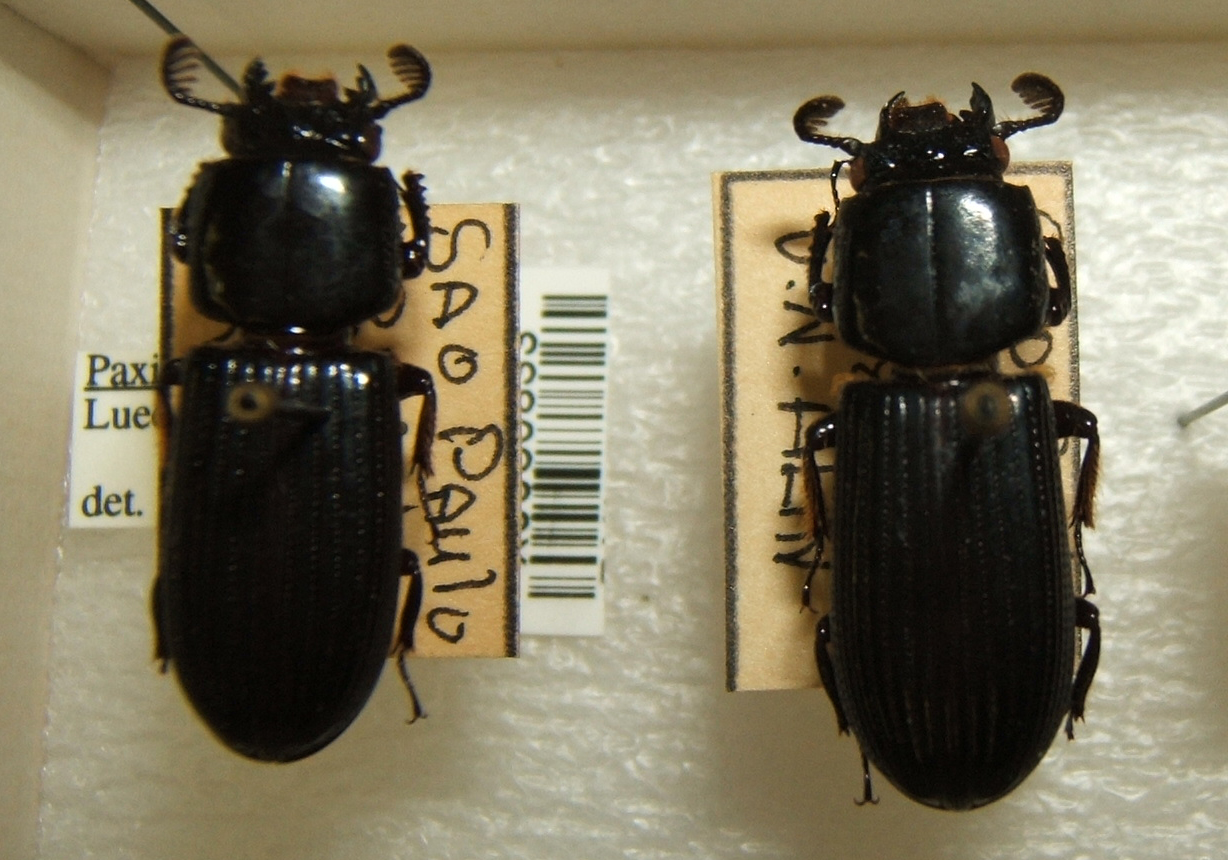
- Adults

Scientific classification
- Kingdom: Animalia
- Phylum: Arthropoda
- Class: Insecta
- Order: Coleoptera
- Suborder: Polyphaga
- Infraorder: Scarabaeiformia
- Family: Passalidae
- Genus: Paxillus
- Species: P. pentaphylloides

Binomial name
- Paxillus pentaphylloides Luederwaldt, 1931

= Paxillus pentaphylloides =

Species of beetle

Paxillus pentaphylloides is a species of beetle in the family Passalidae. It is found in Mexico.
