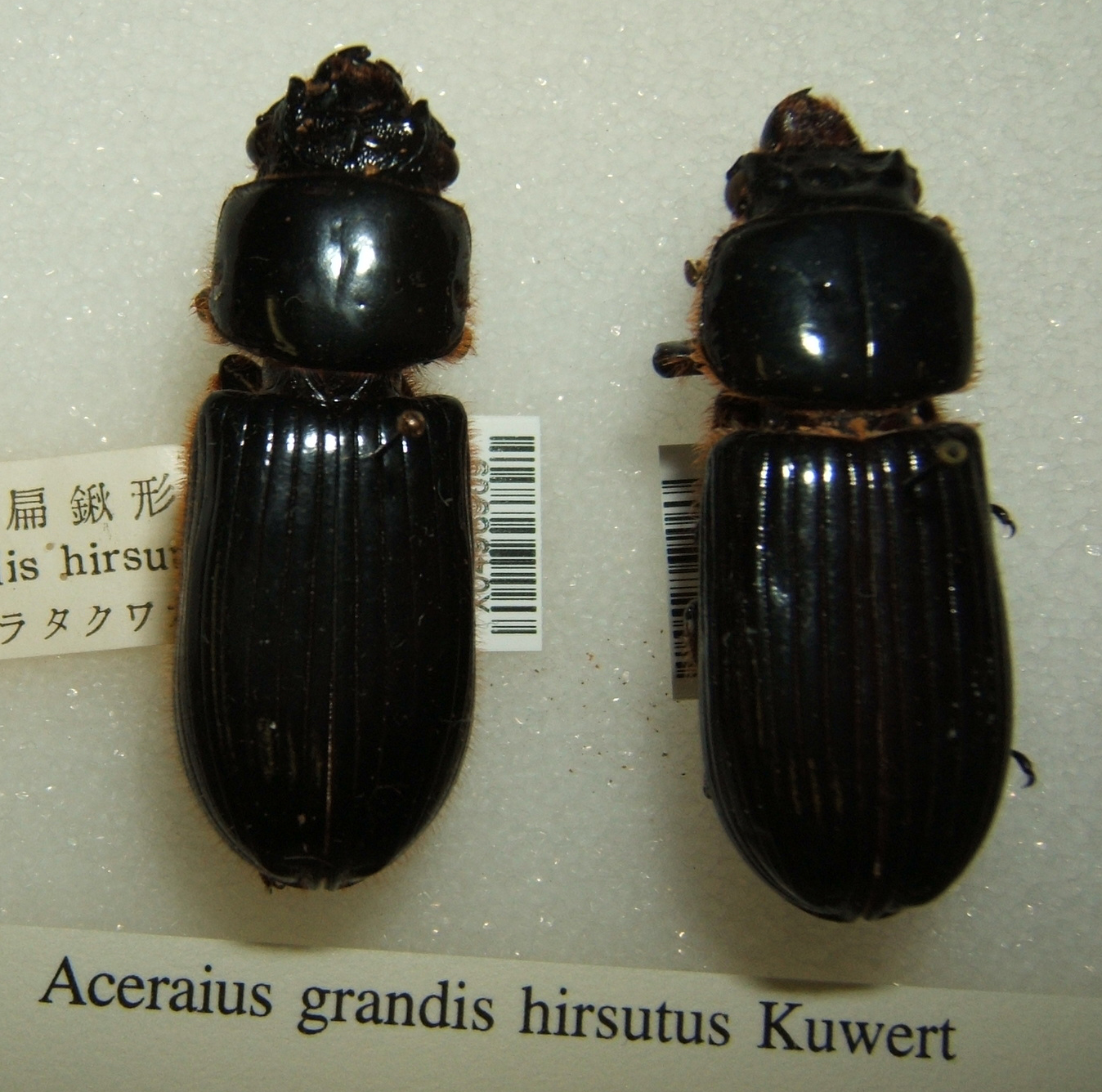
- Aceraius grandis hirsutus, adult

Scientific classification
- Kingdom: Animalia
- Phylum: Arthropoda
- Class: Insecta
- Order: Coleoptera
- Suborder: Polyphaga
- Infraorder: Scarabaeiformia
- Family: Passalidae
- Genus: Aceraius
- Species: A. grandis

Binomial name
- Aceraius grandis Kuwert, 1891

= Aceraius grandis =

Species of beetle

Aceraius grandis is a beetle of the family Passalidae. It was first scientifically described by Burmeister in 1847 under the basionym Passalus grandis, but was later reclassified.
