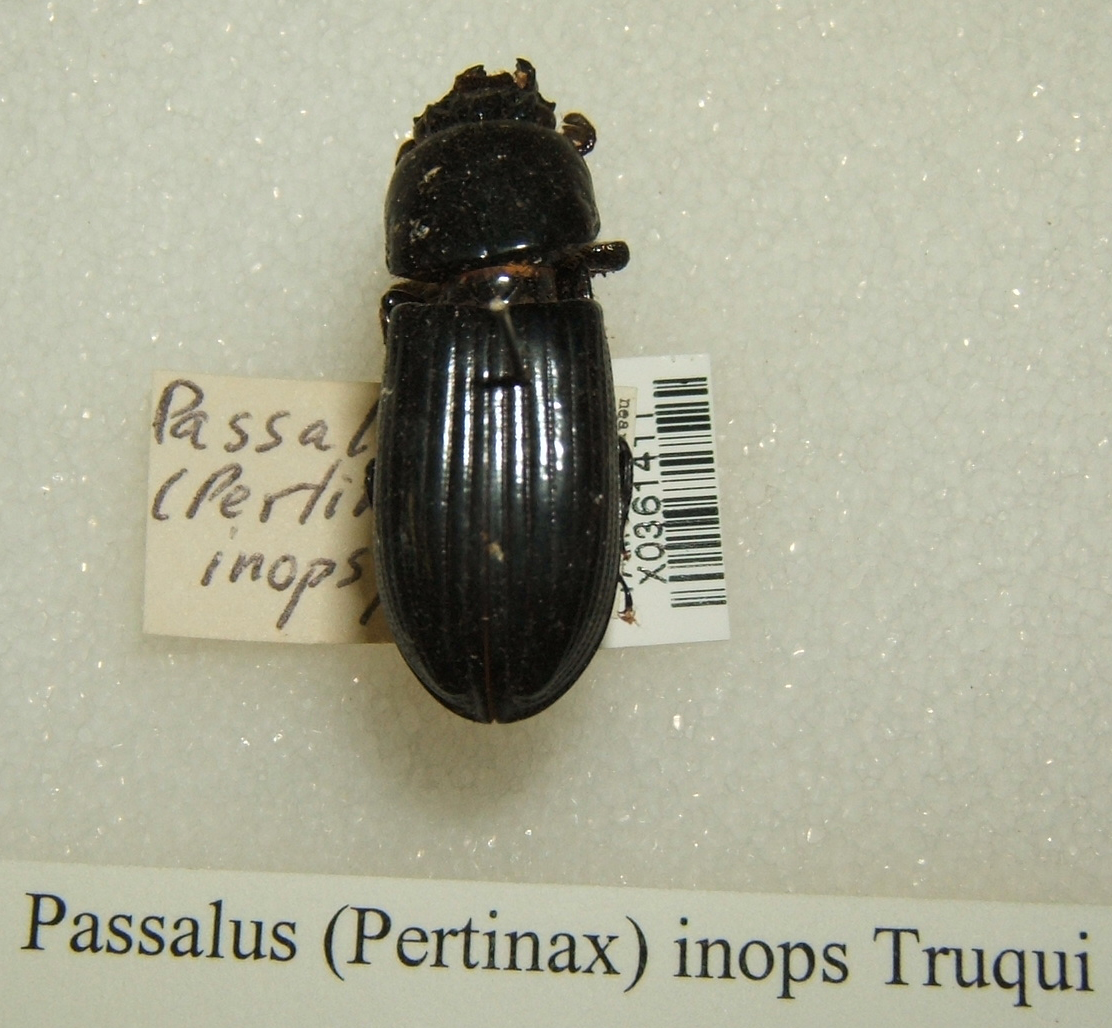
- Genus species, adult

Scientific classification
- Kingdom: Animalia
- Phylum: Arthropoda
- Clade: Pancrustacea
- Class: Insecta
- Order: Coleoptera
- Suborder: Polyphaga
- Infraorder: Scarabaeiformia
- Family: Passalidae
- Genus: Passalus
- Species: P. inops

Binomial name
- Passalus inops Truqui, 1857

= Passalus inops =

Species of beetle

Passalus inops is a beetle of the Family Passalidae.
