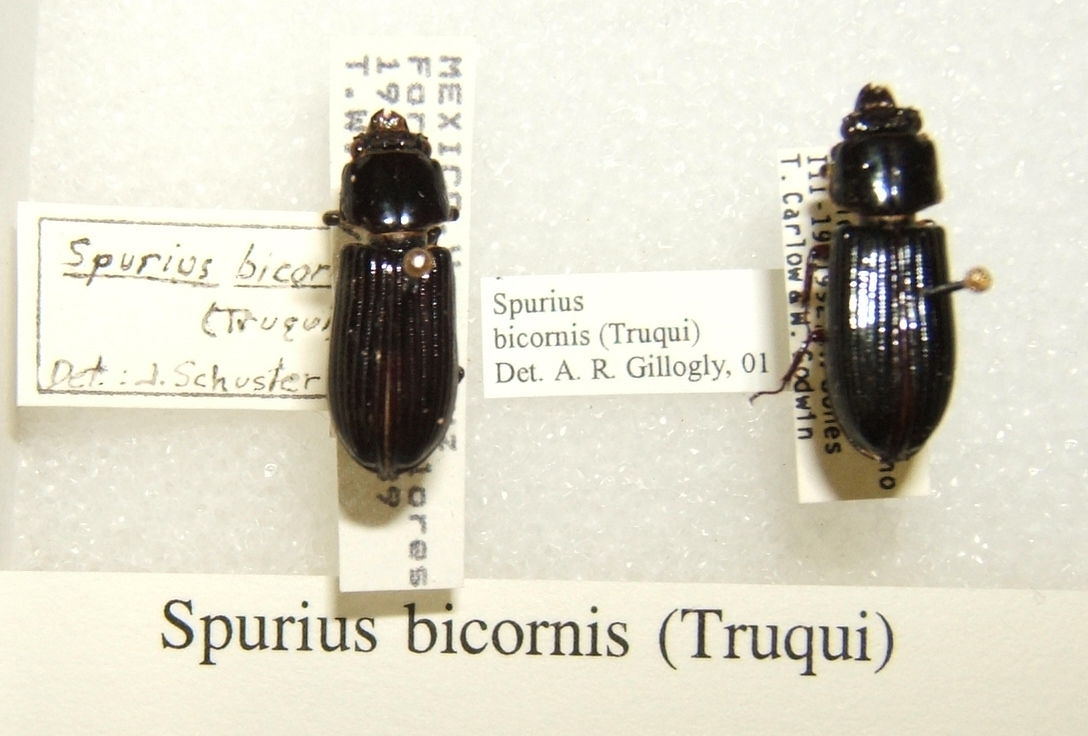
- Spurius bicornis

Scientific classification
- Domain: Eukaryota
- Kingdom: Animalia
- Phylum: Arthropoda
- Class: Insecta
- Order: Coleoptera
- Suborder: Polyphaga
- Infraorder: Scarabaeiformia
- Family: Passalidae
- Genus: Spurius; Kaup, 1871

Species
- 5 species (see text)

= Spurius =

Genus of beetles

Spurius is a small genus of passalid beetles from Mesoamerica.

== Species ==
There are five recognized species:

- Spurius bicornis (Truqui, 1857)
- Spurius conradi Rosmini, 1902
- Spurius depressifrons (Bates, 1889)
- Spurius dichotomus Zang, 1905
- Spurius halffteri Reyes-Castillo, 1970
