= Achille Rémy Percheron =

French entomologist (1797–1869

Achille Rémy Percheron (25 January 1797 Paris – 1869) was a French entomologist. He listed in his publication Bibliographie entomologique more than 5,000 authors and 500 anonymous contributions.

== Works ==
- With Hippolyte Louis Gory (1800–1852), Monographie des cétoines et genres voisins (J.-B. Baillière, Paris, 1833)
- With Félix Édouard Guérin-Méneville (1799–1874), "Genera" des insectes, ou Exposition détaillée de tous les caractères propres à chacun des genres de cette classe d'animaux (Méquignon-Marvis père et fils, Paris, 1835)
- Monographie des passales et des genres qui en ont été séparés (J.-A. Mercklein, Paris, 1835)
- Bibliographie entomologique, comprenant l'indication par ordre alphabétique de noms d'auteurs : 1° des ouvrages entomologiques publiés en France et à l'étranger, depuis les temps les plus reculés jusque et y compris l'année 1834; 2° des monographies et mémoires contenus dans les recueils, journaux et collections académiques françaises et étrangères... suivie d'une table méthodique et chronologique des matières (deux volumes, J.-B. Baillière, Paris, 1837)
- Encyclopédie d'éducation, ou Exposition abrégée et par ordre de matières des sciences, des arts et des métiers... rédigée par une réunion de savants et de praticiens (Méquignon-Marvis père et fils, Paris, 1837)
