= Amphibolus =

Amphibolus may refer to:

- Amphibolus (bug), a genus of true bugs in the family Reduviidae
- Amphibolus, a genus of tardigrades in the family Eohypsibiidae, synonym of Bertolanius
- Amphibolus, a genus of beetles in the family Ptinidae, synonym of Episernus

== See also ==
- Amphibolusa, a genus of beetles
