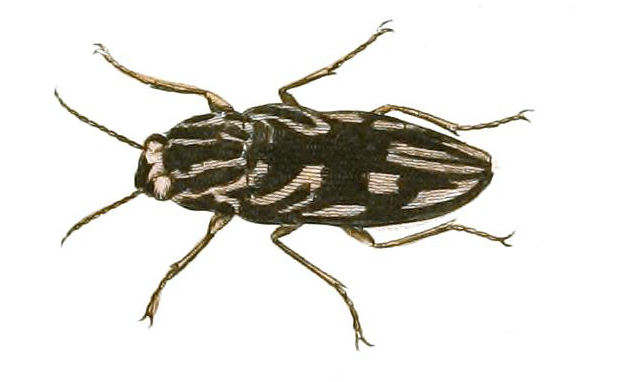

Scientific classification
- Kingdom: Animalia
- Phylum: Arthropoda
- Clade: Pancrustacea
- Class: Insecta
- Order: Coleoptera
- Suborder: Polyphaga
- Infraorder: Elateriformia
- Family: Buprestidae
- Genus: Chalcophora
- Species: C. virginiensis

Binomial name
- Chalcophora virginiensis (Drury, 1770)

= Chalcophora virginiensis =

Species of beetle

Chalcophora virginiensis, the sculptured pine borer, is a metallic woodboring beetle of the Buprestidae family. It is endemic to forested areas in the eastern United States and Canada. Some authors have synonymised it with the western species Chalcophora angulicollis, but Maier and Ivie (2013) demonstrate that the species are distinct.

== Habitat and appearance ==
Head small and broad. Antennae about the length of the thorax, and small. Thorax broad and rugged, having the elevated parts of a dark coppery colour; but the depressed ones lighter, covered with very small punctures, and joining close to the wing-cases. Scutellum very small and triangular. Elytra of the same colour with the thorax; the dark parts in the figure being those that lie highest. They are margined on the sides and suture, extending even with the anus; which near their edges are slightly serrated. Under side shining and coppery, but on the sides with a tincture of flesh colour. Legs the same; with two tibial spurs. Length, a little more than an inch.

A fuller description is given by Maier & Ivie.

Recorded hosts are the red pine (Pinus resinosa) and white pine (P. strobus). In addition to its native home in North America, specimens have been taken in Europe and Japan, presumably as a result of accidental introduction in transported timber.

== See also ==
- Woodboring beetle
