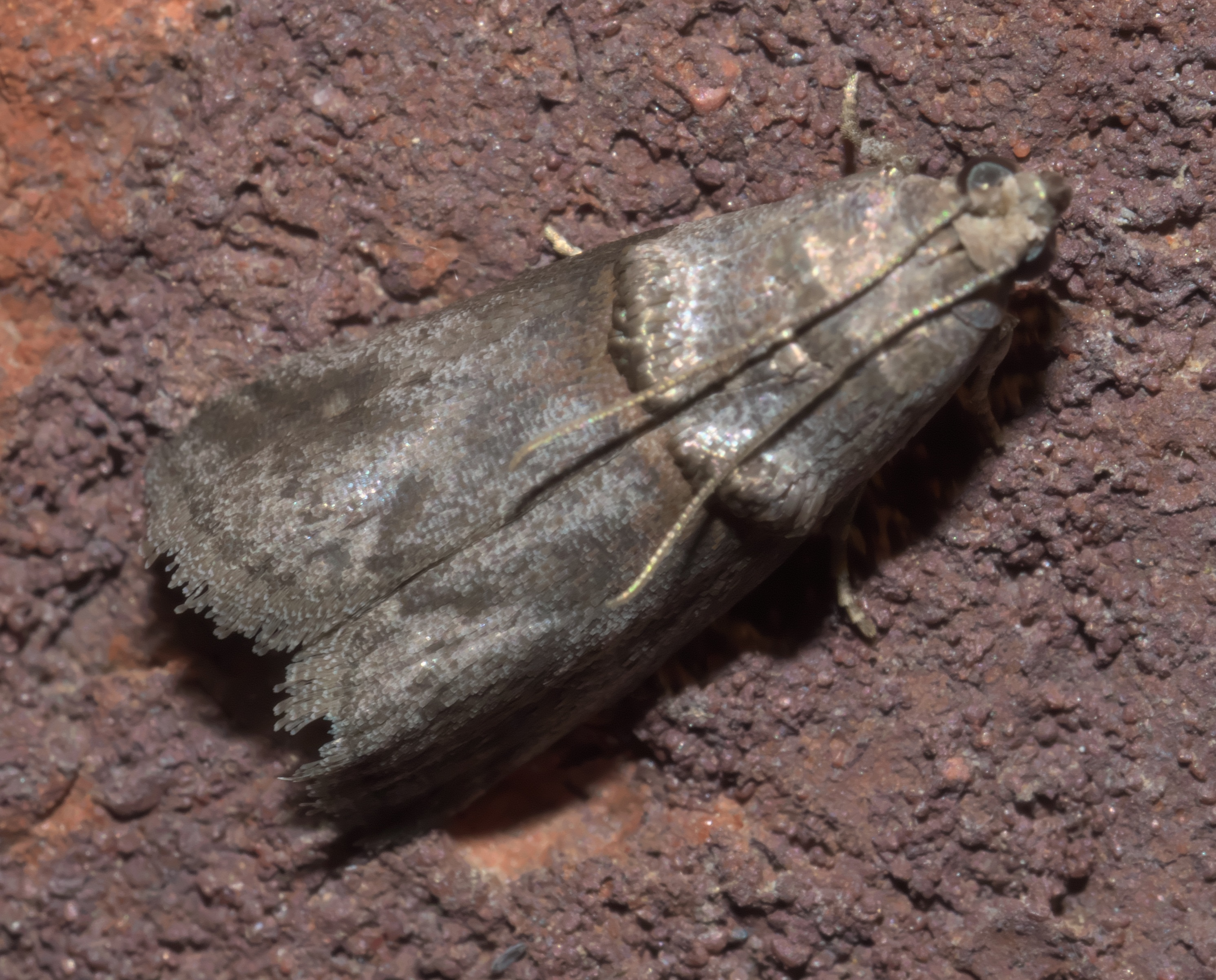

Scientific classification
- Kingdom: Animalia
- Phylum: Arthropoda
- Clade: Pancrustacea
- Class: Insecta
- Order: Lepidoptera
- Family: Pyralidae
- Genus: Acrobasis
- Species: A. caryae

Binomial name
- Acrobasis caryae Grote, 1881

Synonyms
- Acrobasis caryaevorella Dyar, 1908

= Acrobasis caryae =

Species of moth

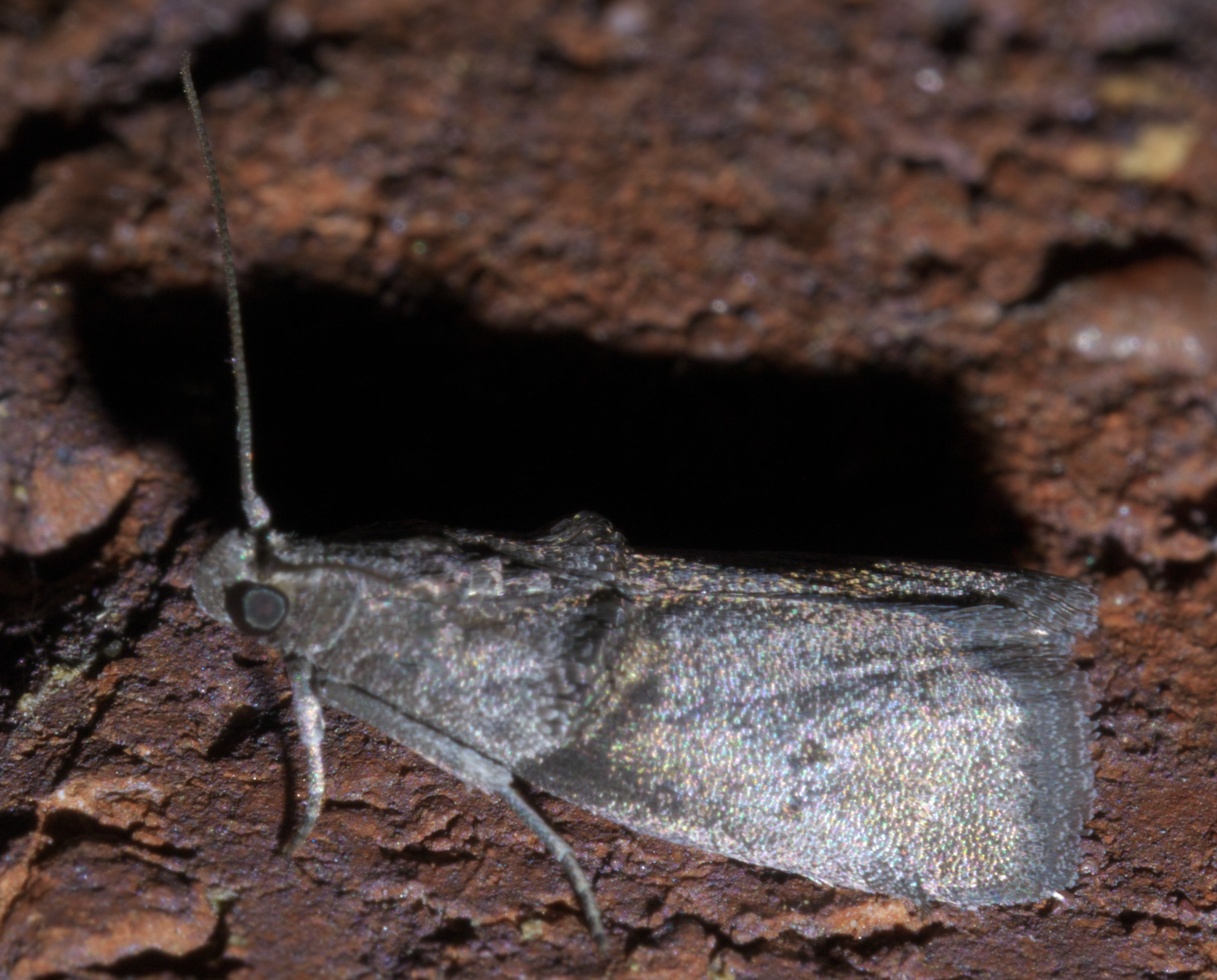
Acrobasis caryae, hickory shoot borer

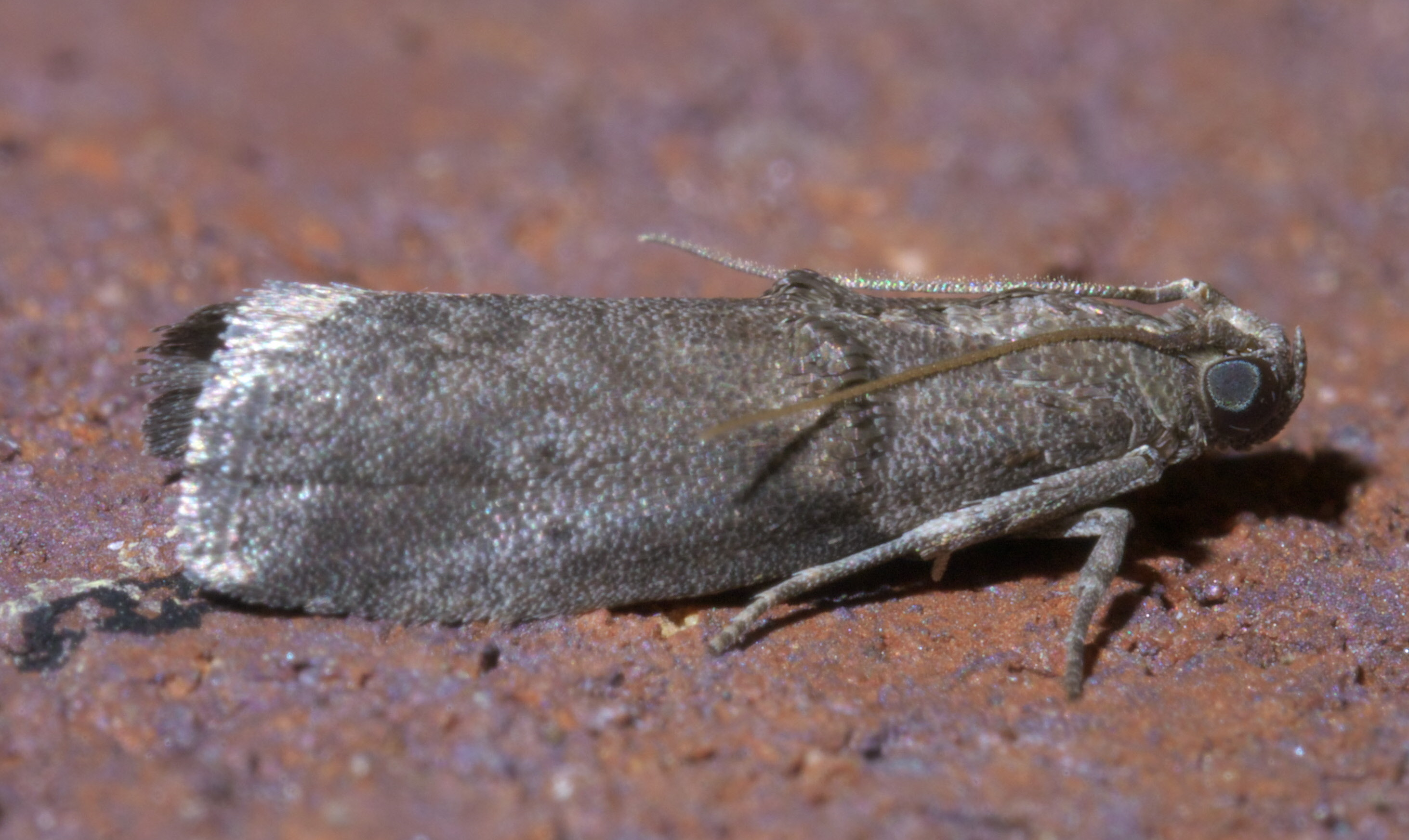
Acrobasis caryae, hickory shoot borer, Size: 8.8 mm

Acrobasis caryae, the hickory shoot borer, is a species of snout moth in the genus Acrobasis. It was described by Augustus Radcliffe Grote in 1881, and is known from southeastern Ontario, Canada, and the eastern United States.

The larvae feed on Carya species, including Carya cordiformis, Carya tomentosa, Carya pallida, Carya glabra, Carya ovata and Carya carolinae-septentrionalis. They feed within the shoots of their host plant.
