= Episernus trapezoideus =

Scientific classification
- Kingdom: Animalia
- Phylum: Arthropoda
- Clade: Pancrustacea
- Class: Insecta
- Order: Coleoptera
- Suborder: Polyphaga
- Family: Ptinidae
- Tribe: Ernobiini
- Genus: Episernus
- Species: E. trapezoideus

Binomial name
- Episernus trapezoideus (Fall, 1905)

Species of beetle

Episernus trapezoideus is a species of beetle in the family Ptinidae. It is found in North America.
