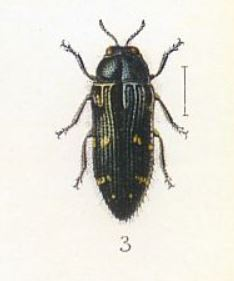

Scientific classification
- Kingdom: Animalia
- Phylum: Arthropoda
- Clade: Pancrustacea
- Class: Insecta
- Order: Coleoptera
- Suborder: Polyphaga
- Infraorder: Elateriformia
- Family: Buprestidae
- Genus: Acmaeodera
- Species: A. angelica

Binomial name
- Acmaeodera angelica Fall, 1899

= Acmaeodera angelica =

Species of beetle

Acmaeodera angelica is a species of metallic woodboring beetle in the family Buprestidae. It is found in Central America and North America.
