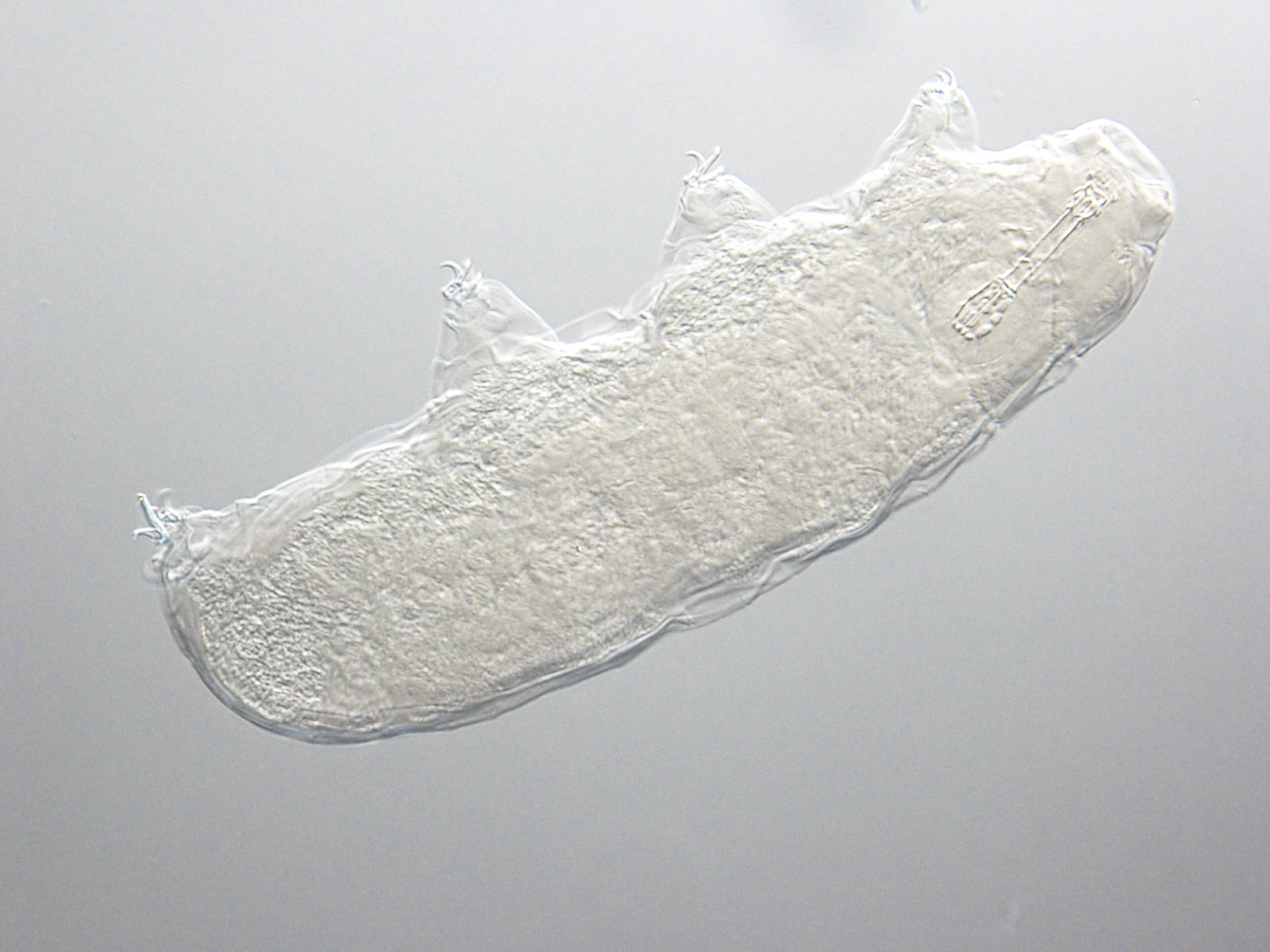
- Austeruseus faeroensis

Scientific classification
- Domain: Eukaryota
- Kingdom: Animalia
- Phylum: Tardigrada
- Class: Eutardigrada
- Order: Parachela
- Family: Eohypsibiidae; Bertolani and Kristensen, 1987

Genera
- See text

= Eohypsibiidae =

Family of tardigrades

Eohypsibiidae is a family of water bear or moss piglet, tardigrades in the class Eutardigrada. It contains the following species in three genera:

- Austeruseus Trygvadottir & Kristensen, 2011
  - Austeruseus balduri Trygvadottir & Kristensen, 2011
  - Austeruseus faroensis Trygvadottir & Kristensen, 2011
  - Austeruseus rokuri Trygvadottir & Kristensen, 2011
- Bertolanius Özdikmen, 2008
  - Bertolanius birnae Hansen, Kristensen, Bertolani & Guidetti, 2016
  - Bertolanius mahunkai Iharos, 1971
  - Bertolanius markevichi Biserov, 1992
  - Bertolanius nebulosus Dastych, 1983
  - Bertolanius portucalensis Fontoura, Pilato, Lisi & Morais, 2009
  - Bertolanius smreczinskii Wêglarska, 1970
  - Bertolanius volubilis Durante Pasa and Maucci, 1975
  - Bertolanius weglarskae Dastych 1972
- Eohypsibius
  - Eohypsibius nadjae Kristensen 1982
  - Eohypsibius terrestris Ito, 1988
