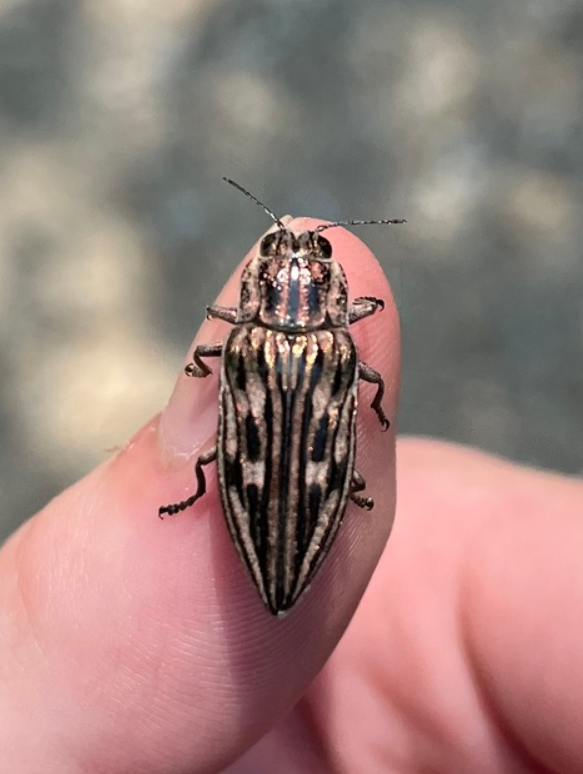

Scientific classification
- Kingdom: Animalia
- Phylum: Arthropoda
- Class: Insecta
- Order: Coleoptera
- Suborder: Polyphaga
- Infraorder: Elateriformia
- Family: Buprestidae
- Genus: Chalcophora
- Species: C. liberta

Binomial name
- Chalcophora liberta (Germar, 1824)

Synonyms
- Chalcophora borealis (Laporte and Gory, 1836); Chalcophora parviceps Casey, 1909

= Chalcophora liberta =

Species of beetle

Chalcophora liberta, known generally as the northeastern sculptured pine borer or smaller flat-headed pine borer, is a species of metallic wood-boring beetle in the family Buprestidae.
