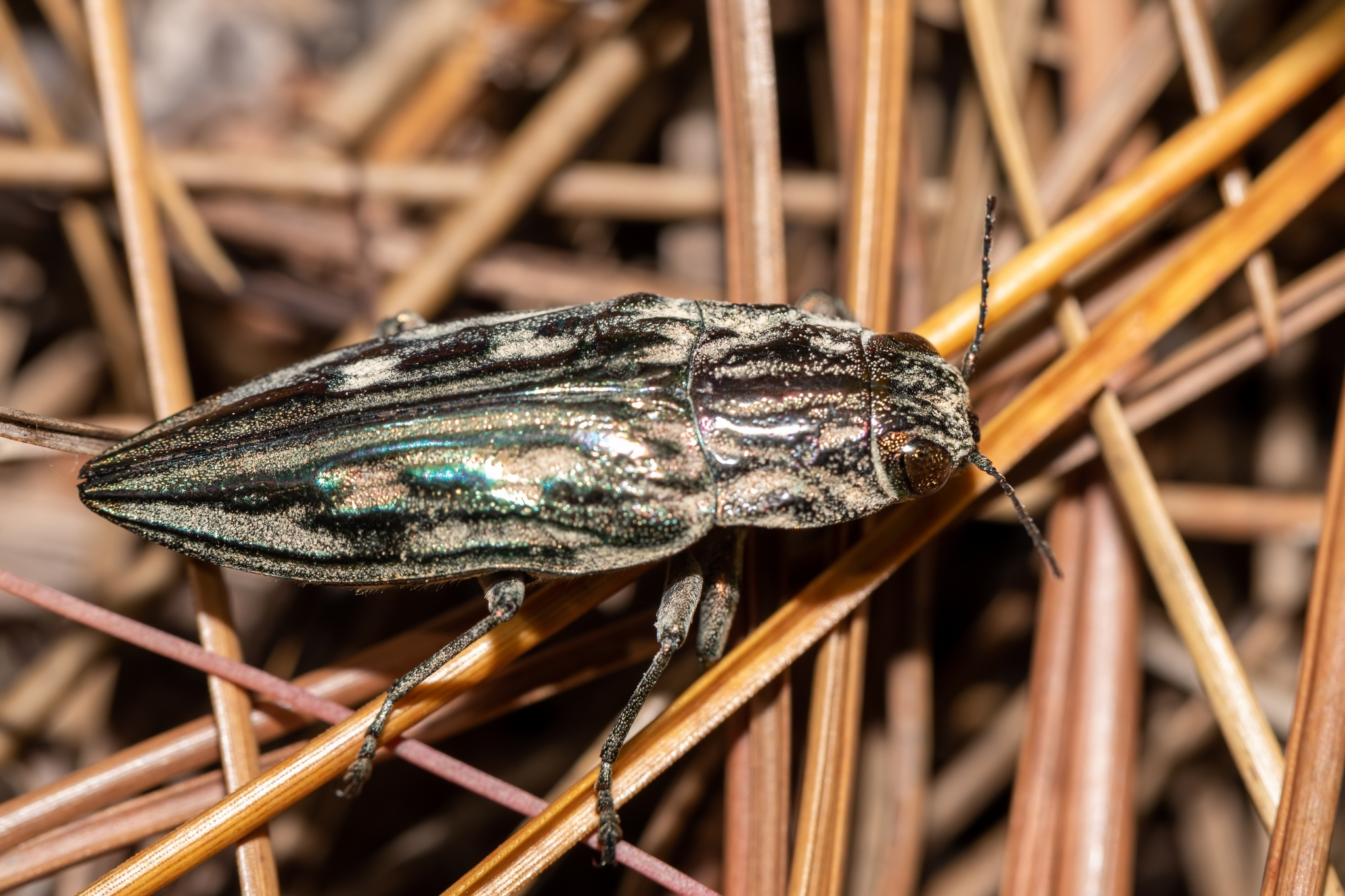

Scientific classification
- Domain: Eukaryota
- Kingdom: Animalia
- Phylum: Arthropoda
- Class: Insecta
- Order: Coleoptera
- Suborder: Polyphaga
- Infraorder: Elateriformia
- Family: Buprestidae
- Genus: Chalcophora
- Species: C. georgiana

Binomial name
- Chalcophora georgiana (LeConte, 1857)

Synonyms
- Chalcophora iridescens Casey, 1909

= Chalcophora georgiana =

Species of beetle

Chalcophora georgiana, commonly known as the southern sculptured pine borer, is a species of metallic wood-boring beetle in the family Buprestidae. It is found in North America.
