= Chalcophora fortis =

Scientific classification
- Kingdom: Animalia
- Phylum: Arthropoda
- Clade: Pancrustacea
- Class: Insecta
- Order: Coleoptera
- Suborder: Polyphaga
- Infraorder: Elateriformia
- Family: Buprestidae
- Genus: Chalcophora
- Species: C. fortis

Binomial name
- Chalcophora fortis LeConte, 1860

Synonyms
- Chalcophora cupreola Casey, 1914; Chalcophora laurentica Casey, 1909

Species of beetle

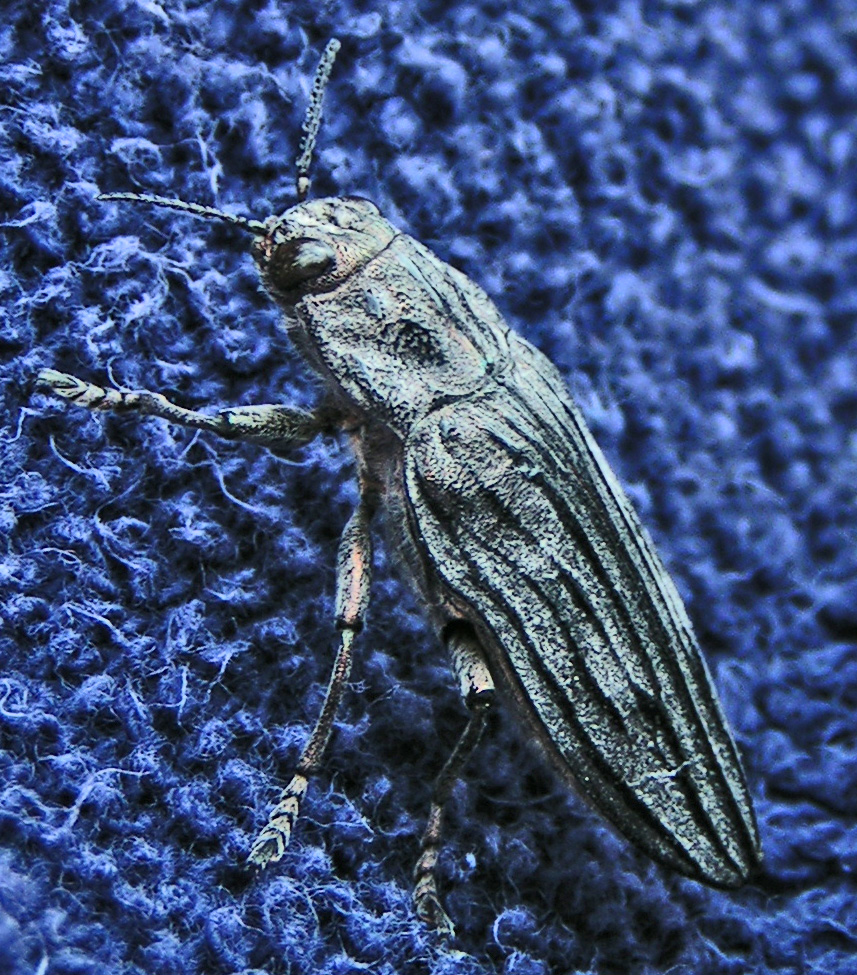
Metallic Wood-boring Beetle Chalcophora fortis, Robinson Island near Killarney, Ontario, Canada.

Chalcophora fortis is a species in the family Buprestidae ("metallic wood-boring beetles"), in the order Coleoptera ("beetles"). It is found in North America.
