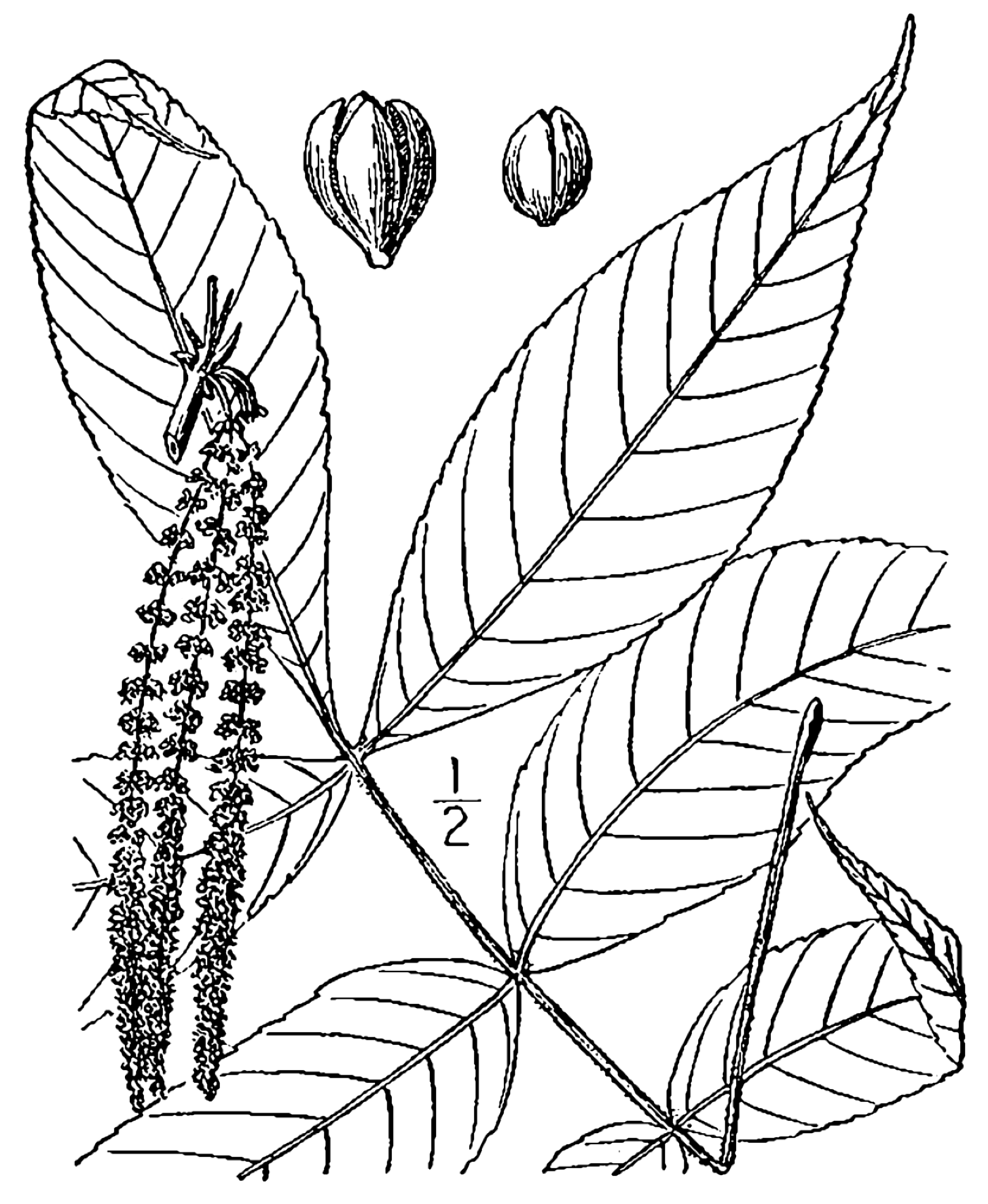

Conservation status
- Least Concern (IUCN 3.1)

Scientific classification
- Kingdom: Plantae
- Clade: Tracheophytes
- Clade: Angiosperms
- Clade: Eudicots
- Clade: Rosids
- Order: Fagales
- Family: Juglandaceae
- Genus: Carya
- Section: Carya sect. Carya
- Species: C. pallida

Binomial name
- Carya pallida (Ashe) Engelm. & Graebn.

Synonyms
- Carya pallida var. apposita (Ashe) Ashe; Carya pallida var. arenicola (Ashe) Ashe; Carya pallida var. pyriformis (Ashe) Ashe; Hicorius pallida Ashe; Hicorius pallida var. apposita Ashe; Hicorius pallida var. arenicola Ashe; Hicorius pallida var. arkansana Ashe; Hicorius pallida var. pyriformis Ashe; Hicorius pallida var. villosa Ashe

= Carya pallida =

Sand hickory

Species of flowering plant

Carya pallida, sand hickory, or pale hickory is a species of hickory native to the southeastern United States. It is a perennial, dicotyledonous plant which prefers rocky or sandy habitats. The sand hickory can reach heights of up to 30m, but its typical height is between 9-24m. In an open area, Carya crowns are usually towering and slim. The sand hickory nut is edible and consumed by various organisms.

== Description ==
Sand hickory bark changes appearance at maturity. Young tree bark is even and a light-gray or brown colour. Deep squamous ridges and dark-gray colours are present on the bark of older specimens. Male catkins and female flowers grow on each plant making it monoecious.

Carya pallida leaves are compound and alternate. Leaflets are commonly ovate, and are in groups of 5 to 9, but 7 is most typical. Its rachis and midrib are hirsute with tattered, soft hairs. The abaxial side is covered in scales ranging from silvery-blue to silvery-yellow. Characteristic of hickory, C. pallida wood is thick, durable, and shock absorbent. Compared to other hickories, their twigs are slimmer. Emerging buds are protected by mahogany bud scales. Carya spp., the "true hickories", form extensive taproots which can make transplanting trees difficult or impossible. Loss of new trees is common, so extra care must be taken. Carya pallida has the potential to be a fitting shade or specimen tree.

Male catkins are 7 to 10 cm (3–4 in) long while female flowers are of similar size. Pollination occurs by wind dispersal. Blooming occurs during the spring season from March to May. Flowers range from yellow to green to brown. The nut of C. pallida is oval, dark-brown, and protected by a thin shell. The kernel has been described as sweet tasting. Kernels are consumed by rodents, squirrels, and large birds.

== Taxonomy ==
Carya pallida was first described in 1902 by botanist William W. Ashe in The Botanical Gazette in 1918. Synonyms include Hicoria pallida and Hicorius pallida. The common name of C. pallida, pale hickory, refers to the fair abaxial colour of the leaflet. The common name, sand hickory relates to its abundance in sandy soils. Some sources list a common name of pignut hickory, but this usually refers to Carya glabra.

Carya pallida var. apposita, C. pallida var. arenicola, and C. pallida var. pyriformus are all varieties described by Ashe in the Bulletin of the Charleston Museum in 1918.

== Distribution and habitat ==
The sand hickory has been recorded in most southeastern states. Its range extends from Delaware and to the west of Missouri. Carya pallida has not been recorded in Pennsylvania, West Virginia, or Ohio. Rarely, it can be found in southwestern Indiana, and it is uncommon in Maryland. Population decline has been reported in Arkansas, Illinois, Indiana, Louisiana, and Missouri. Sand hickory is also prominent in dry oak-hickory forests. Specifically, it can be often found alongside longleaf pine (Pinus palustris) and scrub oak (Quercus marilandica). Hybridization with pignut hickory (Carya glabra) has been reported.

== Ethnobotany ==
Hickory wood is prized for its durability and utility. However, it requires additional manufacturing time due to its density. Hickory wood is used for flooring, cooking, cabinetry, furniture, firewood, musical instruments, and tool handles. Historically, golf club handles were crafted from hickory. Economically, hickory wood is important to forestry landowners and industry.

== Notable specimens ==
A champion sand hickory was discovered in Greenville, SC, in 2015. It was recorded by the American Forests organization, and it is on the National Register of Champion Trees. It was 46m in height, and its crown spread 24m wide. As of 2020, this is the largest known sand hickory.

== Pathology ==
Carya pallida is a host plant of Microstroma juglandis. This causes the fungal disease Downy Leaf Spot. Symptoms include fading light-green blots on the adaxial side and floury, white, furry blots on the abaxial side. Other hickory pathologies include Fusarium solani, Ceratocystis smalley, hickory bark beetles (Scolytus quadrispinosus), and flat-headed wood borers (Chalcophora japonica).

== Horticulture science ==
Carya spp. are more likely to contain rare earth elements (REE) or metallomes in their cells than other genera. They have been found to contain Scandium, Lanthanum, Gadolinium, and other minerals. Currently, the role of the REE is unknown. Horticulturists speculate that they could aid in disease resistance, enzyme activities, ion transportation or other chemical functions.

Carya pallida is a tetraploid species along with C. floridana, C. glabra, C. texana, and C. tomentosa. Carya spp. may be divided into three groups: 16, 24, and 32-chromosomal counts.

== Gallery ==
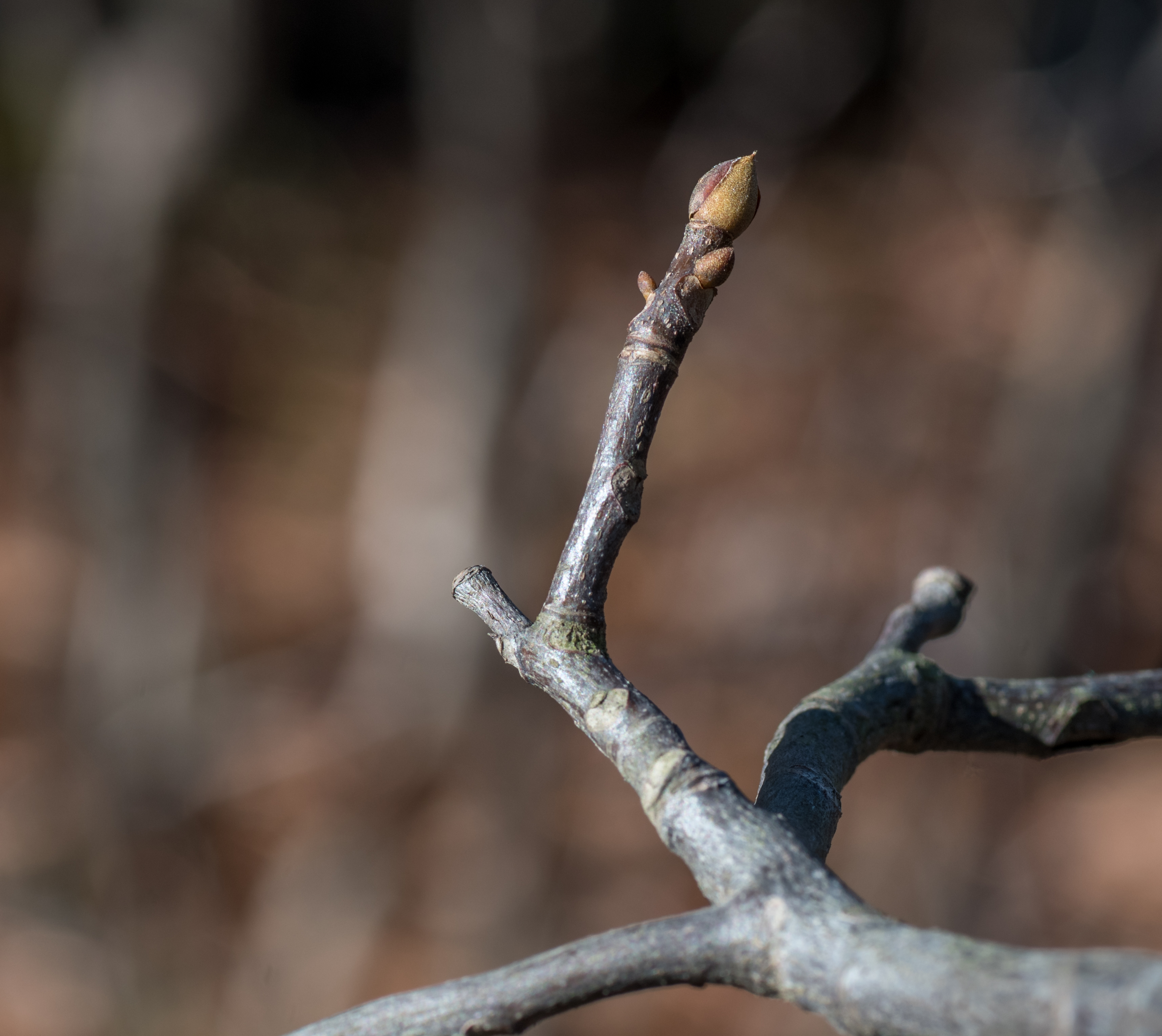
Bud

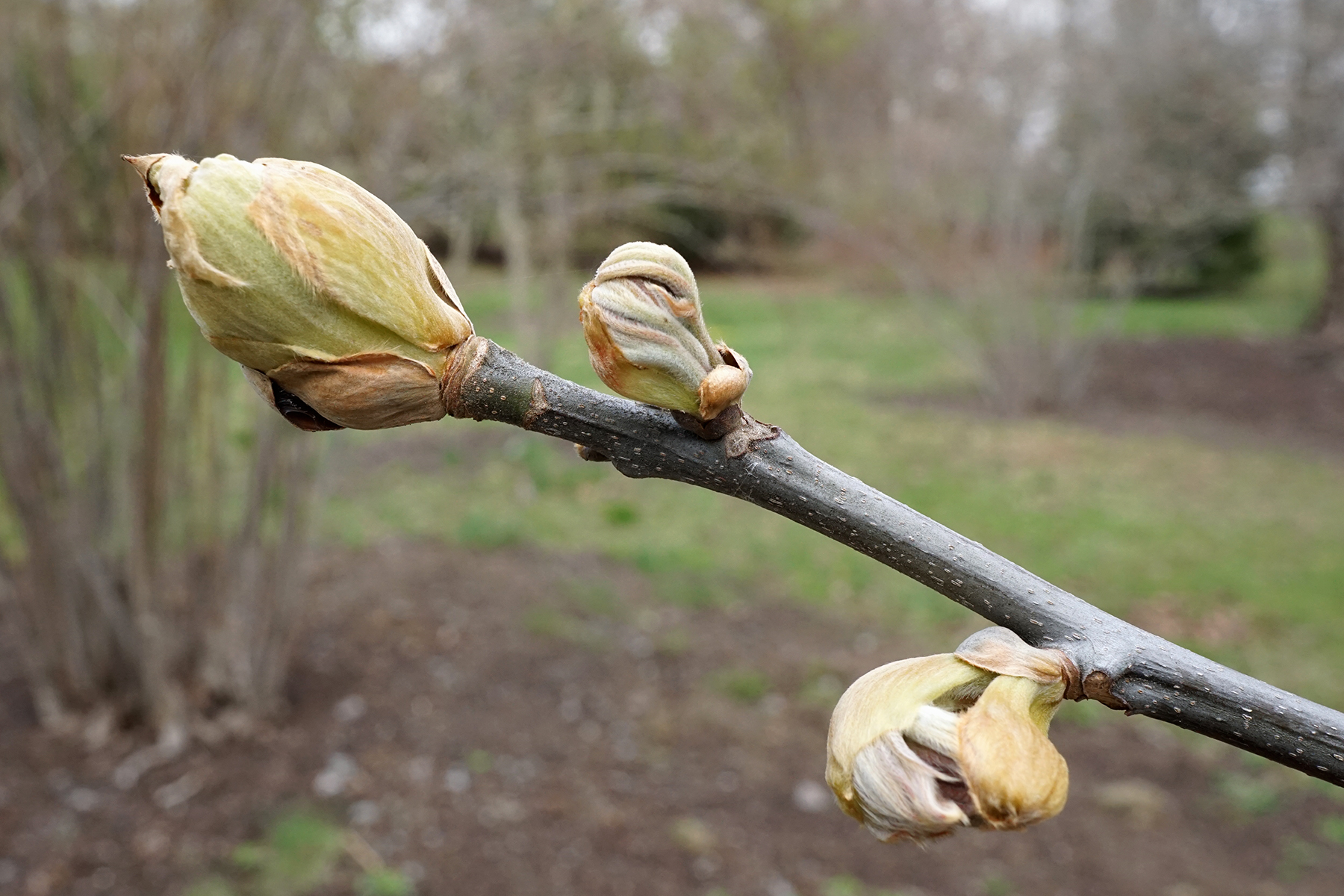
Bud break
