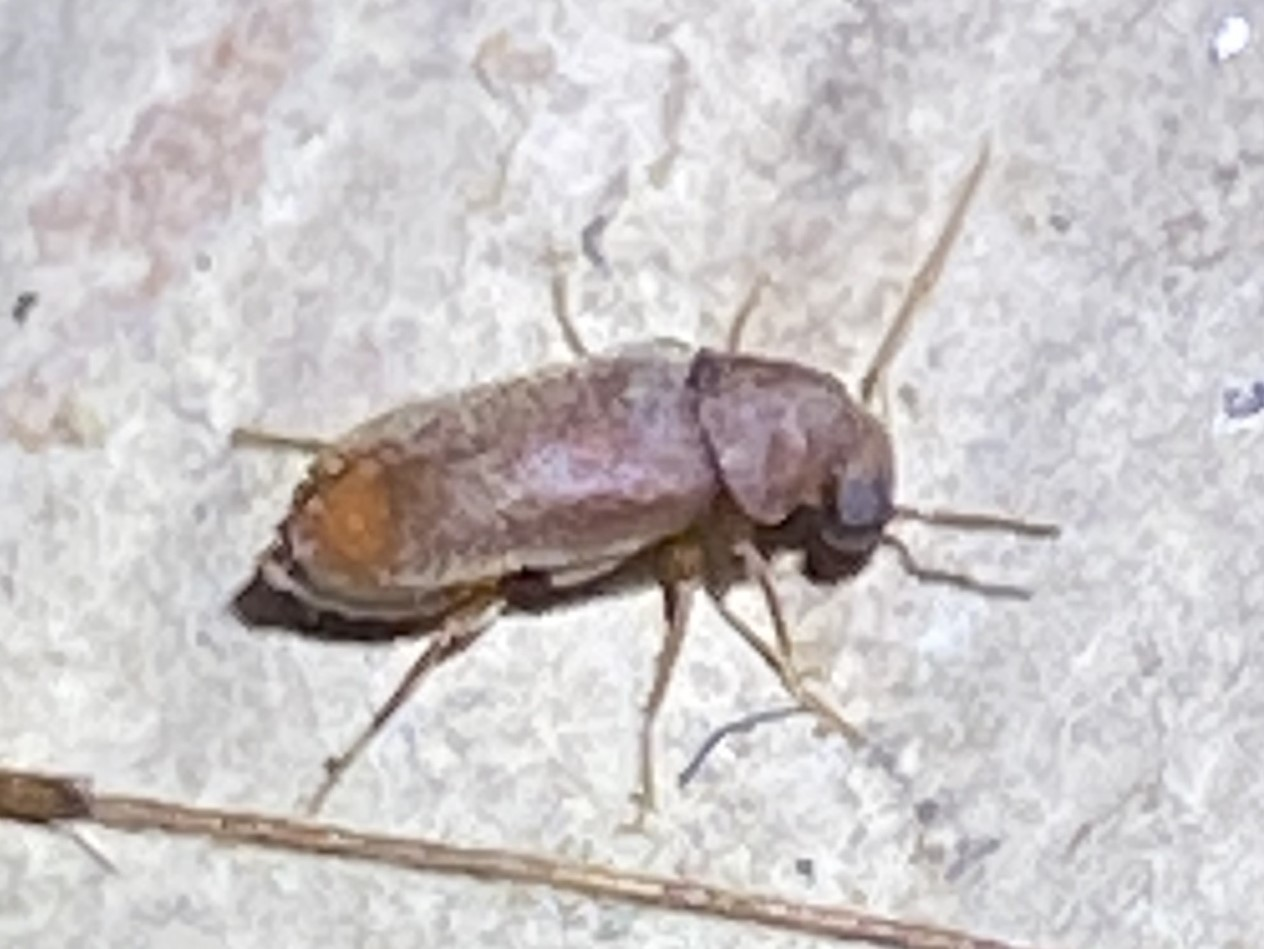
- Ernobius granulatus found near Austin, Texas.

Scientific classification
- Kingdom: Animalia
- Phylum: Arthropoda
- Clade: Pancrustacea
- Class: Insecta
- Order: Coleoptera
- Suborder: Polyphaga
- Family: Ptinidae
- Genus: Ernobius
- Species: E. granulatus

Binomial name
- Ernobius granulatus LeConte, 1865

= Ernobius granulatus =

Species of beetle

Ernobius granulatus is a species of beetle that belongs to the family Ptinidae. It is found in North America in regions such as the southeastern United States.

It feeds off of first years cones of the longleaf pine (Pinus palustris). It causes serious damages to crops.
