= Ernobius pini =

Scientific classification
- Kingdom: Animalia
- Phylum: Arthropoda
- Class: Insecta
- Order: Coleoptera
- Suborder: Polyphaga
- Family: Ptinidae
- Genus: Ernobius
- Species: E. pini

Binomial name
- Ernobius pini (Sturm, 1837)

Species of beetle

Ernobius pini is a species of beetle in the family Ptinidae.
