= Ernobius angusticollis =

Scientific classification
- Kingdom: Animalia
- Phylum: Arthropoda
- Class: Insecta
- Order: Coleoptera
- Suborder: Polyphaga
- Family: Ptinidae
- Genus: Ernobius
- Species: E. angusticollis

Binomial name
- Ernobius angusticollis (Ratzeburg, 1847)

Species of beetle

Ernobius angusticollis is a species of beetle in the family Ptinidae.
