= Ernobius gigas =

Scientific classification
- Kingdom: Animalia
- Phylum: Arthropoda
- Class: Insecta
- Order: Coleoptera
- Suborder: Polyphaga
- Family: Ptinidae
- Genus: Ernobius
- Species: E. gigas

Binomial name
- Ernobius gigas (Mulsant & Rey, 1863)

Species of beetle

Ernobius gigas is a species of beetle in the family Ptinidae.
