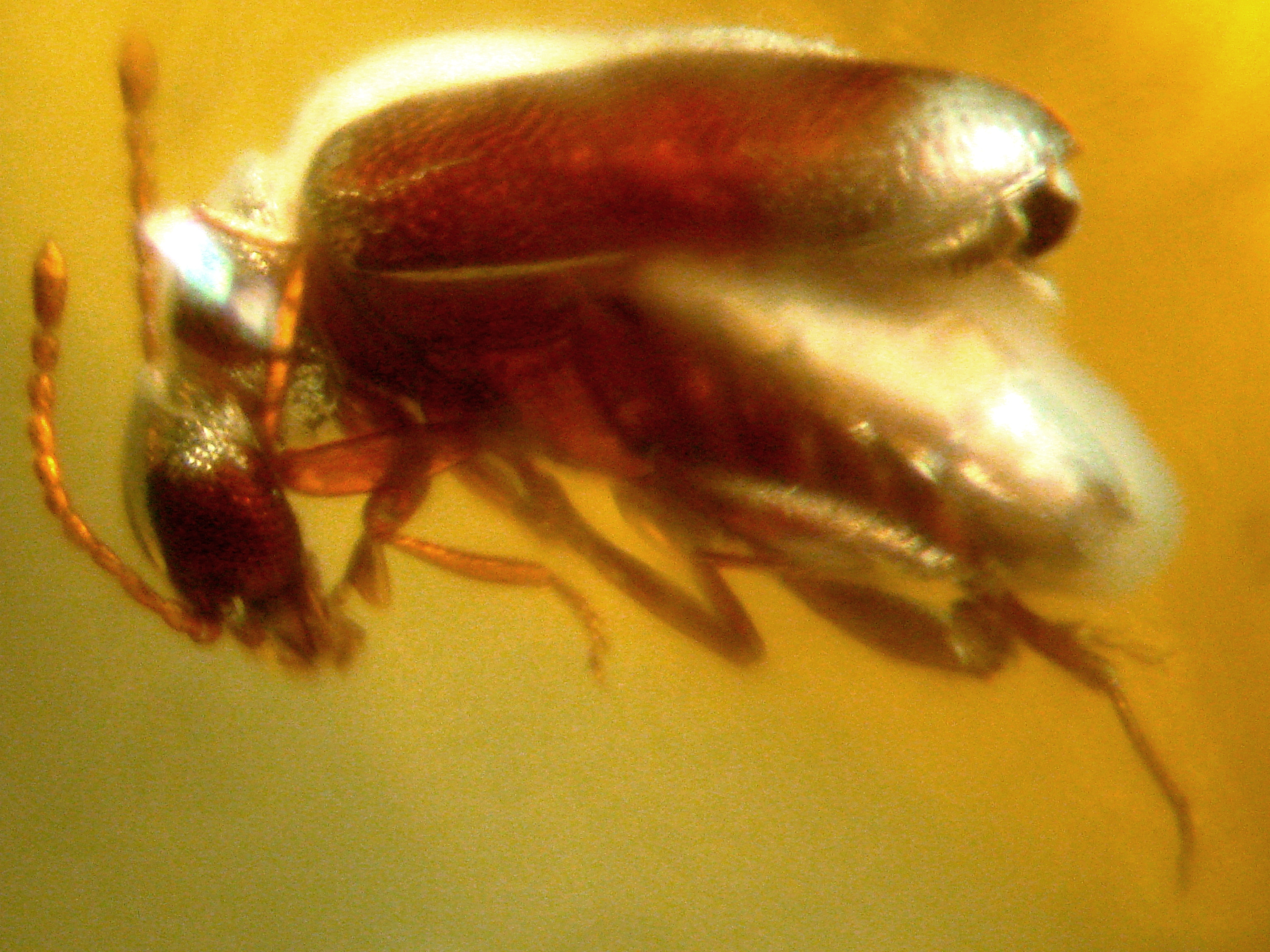
- Episernus sp.

Scientific classification
- Kingdom: Animalia
- Phylum: Arthropoda
- Clade: Pancrustacea
- Class: Insecta
- Order: Coleoptera
- Suborder: Polyphaga
- Family: Ptinidae
- Subfamily: Ernobiinae
- Tribe: Ernobiini
- Genus: Episernus; Thomson, 1863

= Episernus =

Genus of beetles

Episernus is a genus of beetles ranging in the Holarctic and of western distribution in North America, including the Palearctic and the Nearctic. Episernus is similar to Ernobius, but the side margin of the pronotum in the anterior part is effaced, and the antennae are 10-segmented. They consume conifers. For males, the body is more slender. In females, the antennae are shorter.

== Selected species ==
- Episernus angulicollis Thomson, 1863
- Episernus champlaini Fisher 1919 (Ernobius)
- Episernus ganglbaueri Schilsky, 1898
- Episernus gentilis (Rosenhauer, 1847)
- Episernus granulatus Weise, 1887
- Episernus henschi Reitter, 1901
- Episernus hispanus Kiesenwetter, 1877
- Episernus pyrenaeus Maran, 1941
- Episernus striatellus (C. Brisout de Barneville, 1863)
- Episernus sulcicollis Schilsky, 1898
- Episernus taygetanus Maran, 1941
- Episernus trapezoideus Fall, 1905 (Ernobius)
- Episernus turcicus Zahradník, 1998
