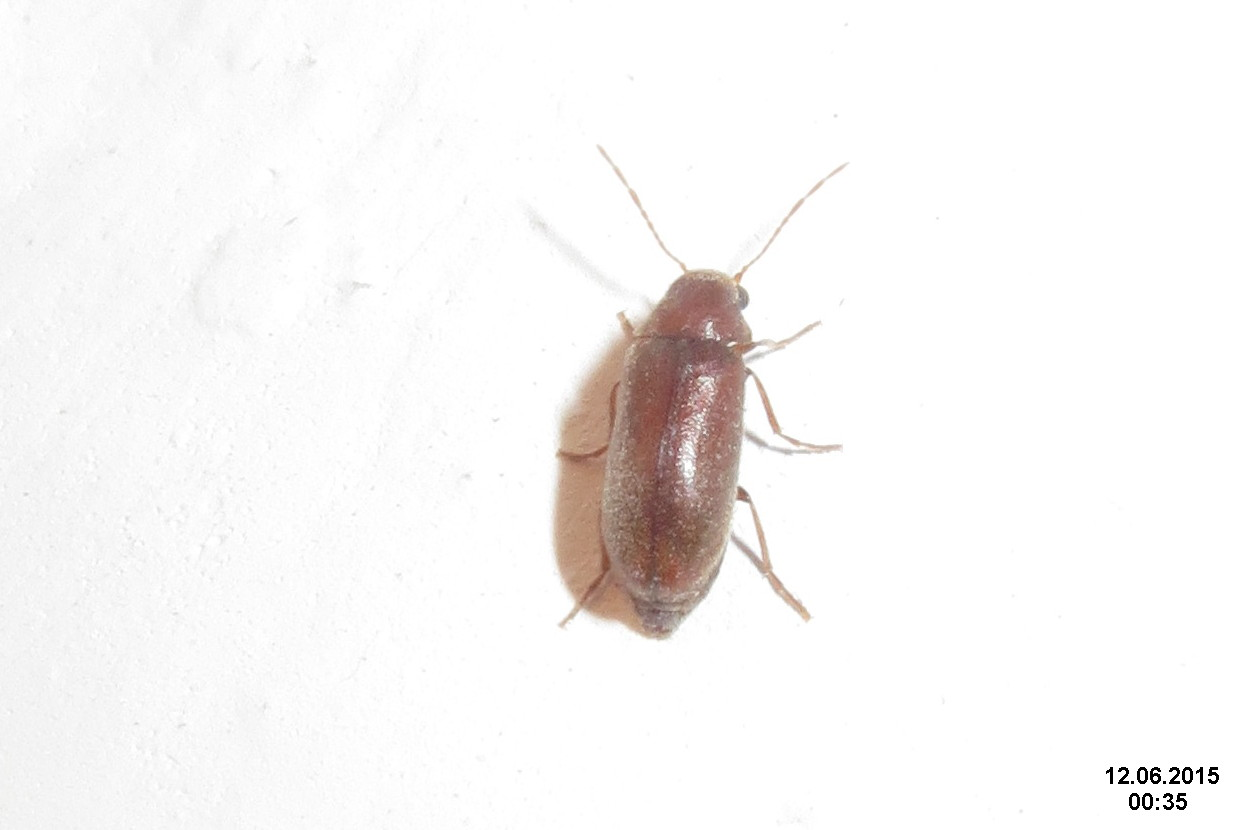

Scientific classification
- Kingdom: Animalia
- Phylum: Arthropoda
- Clade: Pancrustacea
- Class: Insecta
- Order: Coleoptera
- Suborder: Polyphaga
- Family: Ptinidae
- Genus: Ernobius
- Species: E. abietis

Binomial name
- Ernobius abietis (Fabricius, 1792)

= Ernobius abietis =

Species of beetle

Ernobius abietis is a species of beetle in the family Ptinidae.
