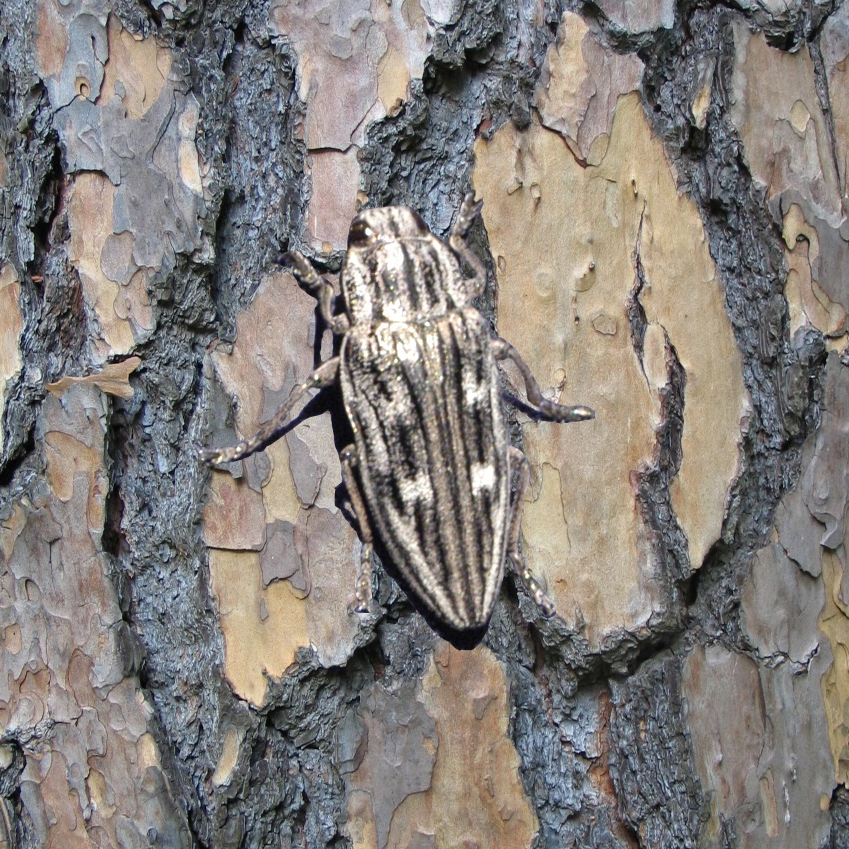
- Chalcophora mariana

Scientific classification
- Kingdom: Animalia
- Phylum: Arthropoda
- Clade: Pancrustacea
- Class: Insecta
- Order: Coleoptera
- Suborder: Polyphaga
- Infraorder: Elateriformia
- Family: Buprestidae
- Subfamily: Chrysochroinae
- Tribe: Chrysochroini
- Genus: Chalcophora; Dejean, 1833

= Chalcophora =

Chalcophora Temporal range: Early Eocene–present

Genus of beetles

Chalcophora is a genus of beetles in the family Buprestidae, containing the following living species:

- Chalcophora alternans (Abeille de Perrin, 1904)
- Chalcophora anachoreta Szallies, 1991
- Chalcophora angulicollis (LeConte, 1857)
- Chalcophora brasiliensis Obenberger, 1928
- Chalcophora detrita (Klug, 1829)
- Chalcophora fortis LeConte, 1860
- Chalcophora georgiana (LeConte, 1857)
- Chalcophora hondurasica Casey, 1909
- Chalcophora humboldti (Laporte & Gory, 1836)
- Chalcophora intermedia (Rey, 1890)
- Chalcophora japonica (Gory, 1840)
- Chalcophora laevigata Heer, 1862
- Chalcophora liberta (Germar, 1824)
- Chalcophora mariana (Linnaeus, 1758)
- Chalcophora massiliensis (Villers, 1789)
- Chalcophora maura Espanol, 1933
- Chalcophora mexicana Waterhouse, 1882
- Chalcophora pulchella Heer, 1862
- Chalcophora virginiensis (Drury, 1770)
- Chalcophora yunnana Fairmaire, 1888

The following fossil species are also known:

- †Chalcophora eocenica Zeiri, Zorzin & Nel, 2026
