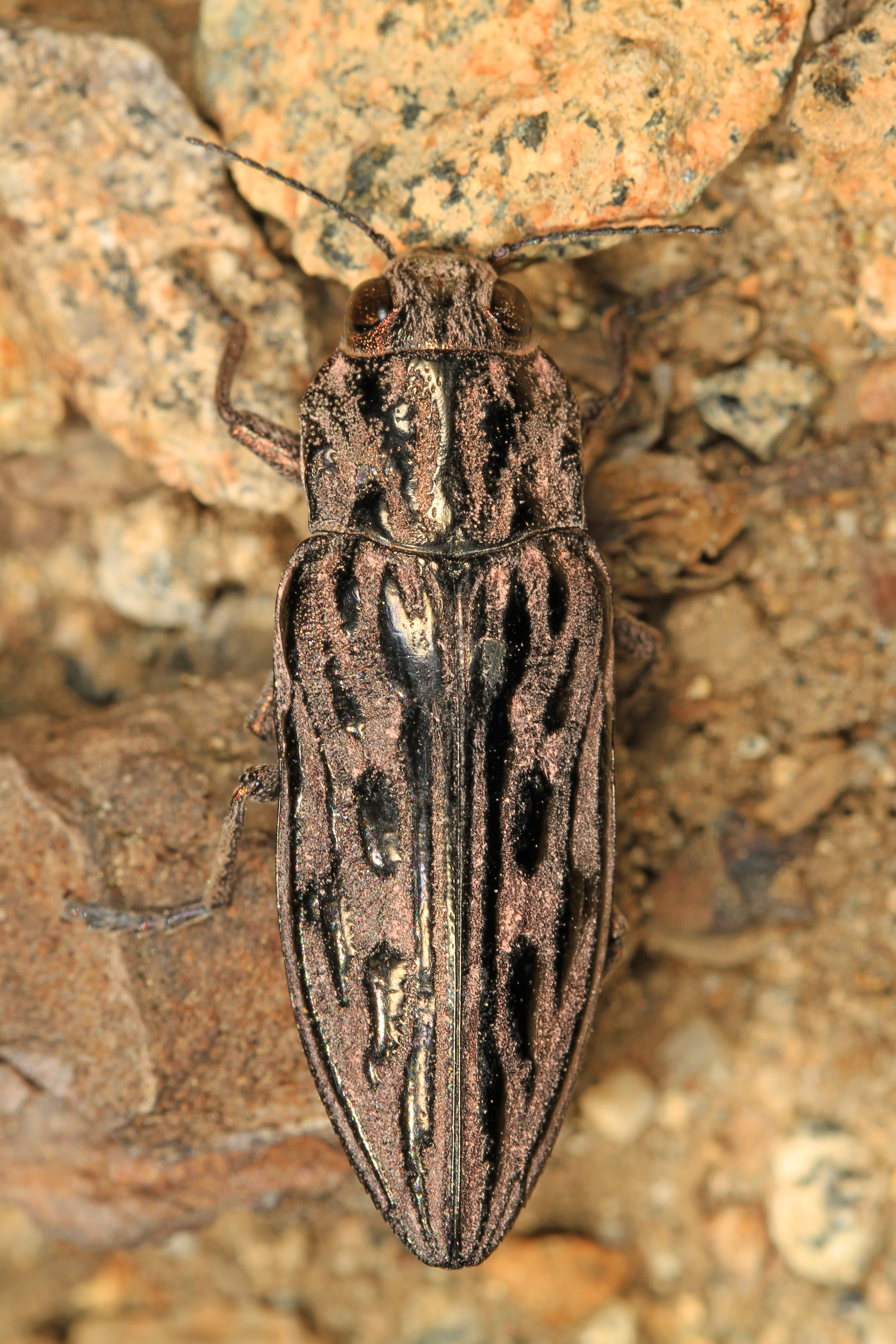

Scientific classification
- Domain: Eukaryota
- Kingdom: Animalia
- Phylum: Arthropoda
- Class: Insecta
- Order: Coleoptera
- Suborder: Polyphaga
- Infraorder: Elateriformia
- Family: Buprestidae
- Genus: Chalcophora
- Species: C. angulicollis

Binomial name
- Chalcophora angulicollis (LeConte, 1857)

Synonyms
- Chalcophora montana Casey, 1909; Chalcophora oregonensis Fitch, 1859; Chalcophora pallida Kerremans, 1919; Chalcophora prominens Casey, 1909

= Chalcophora angulicollis =

Species of beetle

Chalcophora angulicollis, known generally as the western sculptured pine borer or sculptured pine borer, is a species of metallic wood-boring beetle in the family Buprestidae. They are found in dry parts of the world such as the western parts of North America. They have a dark brown textured shell with a shimmery gradient.

== Subspecies ==
These two subspecies belong to the species Chalcophora angulicollis:

- Chalcophora angulicollis angulicollis
- Chalcophora angulicollis montana Casey
