= Bertolanius =

Scientific classification
- Kingdom: Animalia
- Phylum: Tardigrada
- Class: Eutardigrada
- Order: Parachela
- Family: Eohypsibiidae
- Genus: Bertolanius; Özdikmen, 2008

Genus of tardigrades

Bertolanius is a genus of tardigrades belonging to the family Eohypsibiidae.

The species of this genus are found in Europe and Northern America.

Species:

- Bertolanius birnae Hansen, Kristensen, Bertolani & Guidetti, 2016
- Bertolanius mahunkai Iharos, 1971
- Bertolanius markevichi Biserov, 1992
- Bertolanius nebulosus Dastych, 1983
- Bertolanius portucalensis Fontoura, Pilato, Lisi & Morais, 2009
- Bertolanius smreczinskii Wêglarska, 1970
- Bertolanius volubilis Durante Pasa and Maucci, 1975
- Bertolanius weglarskae Dastych 1972

== Overview ==
=== Background ===
Bertolanius Özdikmen is one of three genera in the superfamily Eohypsibioidea, a super family of tardigrades belonging to the Eutardigrada class. As a genus, Bertolanius consist of 8 currently discovered species which can all be found in the northern parts of Europe and North America. All of the Bertolanius species have similar physical and morphological characteristics, with their main differences being in the structure of their eggs, claws, and buccal armature. The genus was originally named Amphibolus Bertolani but was renamed in 2008 to Bertolanius to avoid confusion with other similarly named genera and to pay homage to a major contributing researcher for many of the species in this genus, Roberto Bertolani.

=== General Superfamily Information ===
==== Distribution ====
Tardigrades are known to exist in almost every biome on the earth. There are terrestrial species, marine species, and even fresh water species have been found. The eight currently recognized species in the genus Bertolanius Özdikmen have a wide distribution ranging from colder arctic areas, including Norway and Sweden, to more temperate regions like the Mediterranean. Terrestrial tardigrades can be found in damp environments on lichen and mosses and even on rock and soil samples. Marine species are found at all depths in all oceans across the world. Overall, tardigrades are one of the most widely distributed microscopic organisms.

==== Body Plan ====
Tardigrades belonging to the Bertolanius genus follow the same body plan as all other currently identified tardigrades, which consists of a head and four leg bearing segments for a total of five segments. The body plan of tardigrades is compact and is conserved across all species because of a loss of Hox genes in the early lineage of tardigrades. Tardigrades have three pairs of walking legs, one pair on each section, that are tipped with a paw-like structure. The ends of tardigrade legs have differences for each species, with some having more paw-like structures and some having structures that more resemble claws. The last pair of legs on the last segment of tardigrades is attached in a backwards orientation and can be extended above the animal for grasping onto its surroundings as well as anchoring the animal. Mature tardigrades are generally less than 1mm in length, with most species being around 0.5mm in length when fully grown. Tardigrades have translucent bodies and are usually colored with the pigments from their environments and by what they have eaten.

Because of the similarities in the common layout of tardigrades, one of the main ways to distinguish between the different species is by examining their body plans. In particular, the Bertolanius tardigrades are mainly distinguished by the arrangement and type claw or paw attachments as well as by the differences in their eggs and buccal armatures.

==== Feeding ====
Tardigrades feed on plant and algae cells use their well defined buccal armature to suck the insides of the cell out. The arrangement of the buccal armature has similarities between both classes of tardigrades and generally consist of a buccal ring at the end of their face that is connected to a tubular pharynx and a sucking pharynx. These lead to an esophagus and later a stomach where digestion takes places. Both classes of tardigrades have a hardened extrusible stylet, or stylets, that they use to puncture plant and algae cells. tardigrades belonging to the Eutardigrada class generally have shorter stylets that do not cross in the mouth while Heterotardigrades have longer stylets that do cross. These differences are a contributing factor when identifying tardigrades.

==== Unique characteristics and adaptations ====
One unique characteristic of tardigrades is that they are eutelic organisms, meaning they have a set number of cells once the reach maturity, around 1000 cells for most species, though the number of cells in a mature individual can differ within a species. Development of mature eutelic organisms continues only in the growth of cells and not through cell division.

The most fame worthy adaptation of tardigrades is their ability to withstand extreme conditions by entering cryptobiosis. Cryptobiosis is a state of reversible but extreme metabolic restriction that allows organisms to defend themselves against their surrounding environment. When environmental conditions are bad tardigrades curl up inside their cuticle and make new cuticle layers to protect themselves, this is called a tun. Once in cryptobiosis, tardigrades can survive incredible extremes in temperature, a complete lack of oxygen or water, extreme pressure and the vacuum of space, and radiation levels far above the lethal limit for humans. Tardigrades can stay in cryptobiosis for hours or days or even years depending on the conditions around them and are able to revive themselves within up to 24 hours after conditions have improved. However, tardigrades are not considered extremophiles as they do not live in these extreme conditions.
