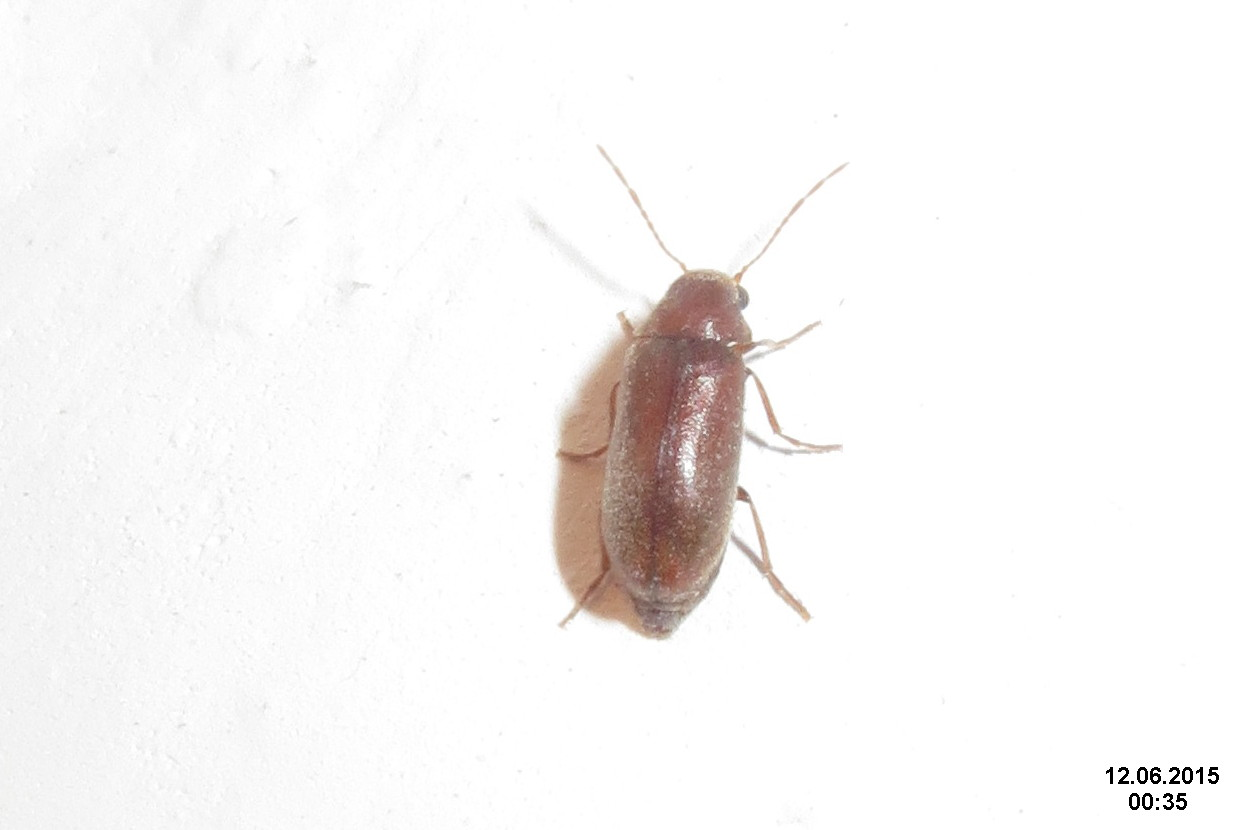
- Ernobius abietis

Scientific classification
- Kingdom: Animalia
- Phylum: Arthropoda
- Class: Insecta
- Order: Coleoptera
- Suborder: Polyphaga
- Family: Ptinidae
- Subfamily: Ernobiinae
- Tribe: Ernobiini

= Ernobiini =

Tribe of beetles

Ernobiini is a tribe of beetles in the family Ptinidae. There are at least 4 genera and 70 described species in Ernobiini.

== Genera ==
These genera belong to the tribe Ernobiini:

- Episernomorphus Thomson, 1863^{i c g b}
- Episernus Thomson, 1859^{i c g b}
- Ernobius Roubal, 1917^{g}
- Paralobium Fall, 1905^{i c g}

Data sources: i = ITIS, c = Catalogue of Life, g = GBIF, b = Bugguide.net
