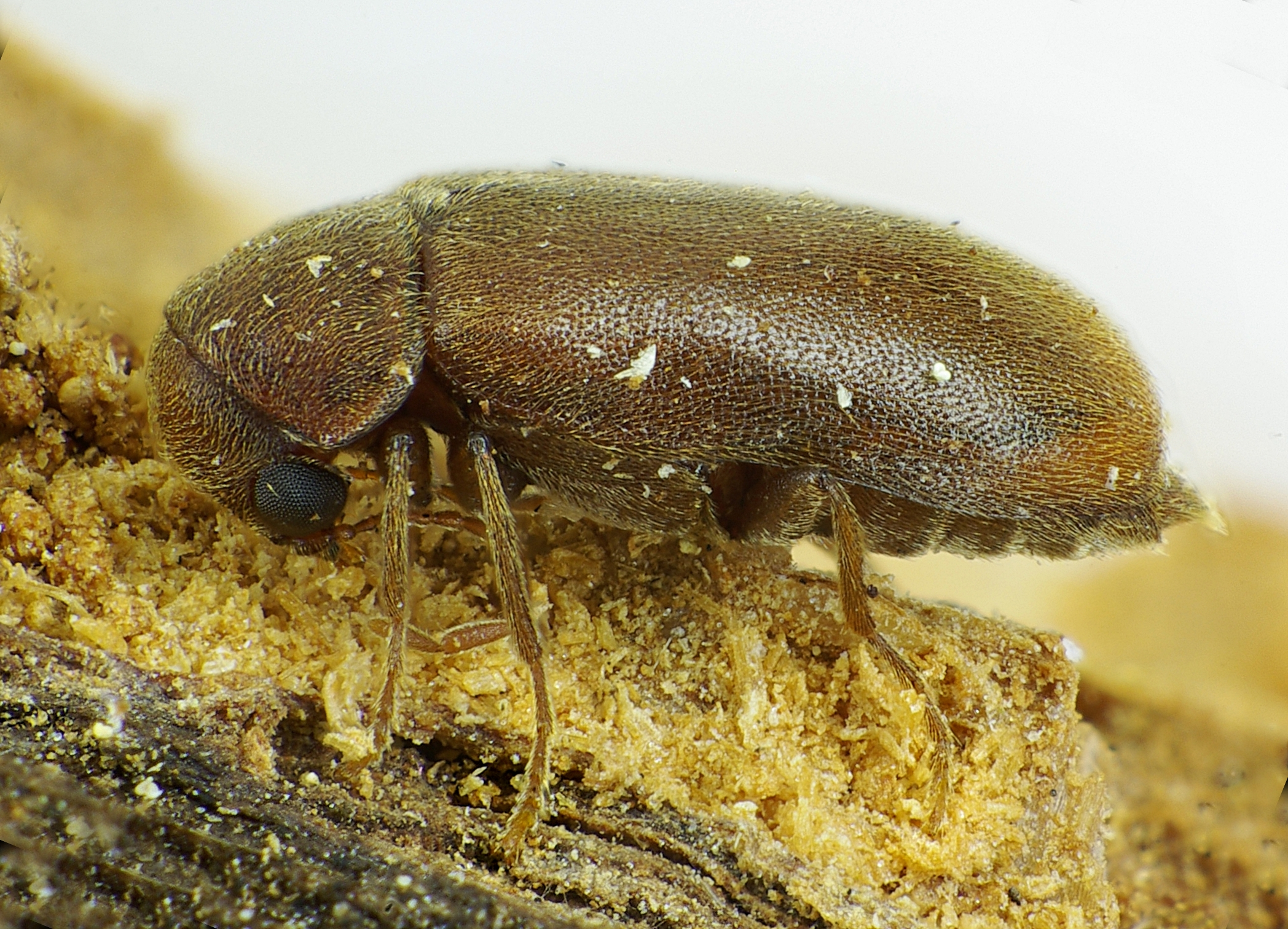
- Ernobius mollis

Scientific classification
- Kingdom: Animalia
- Phylum: Arthropoda
- Class: Insecta
- Order: Coleoptera
- Suborder: Polyphaga
- Family: Ptinidae
- Tribe: Ernobiini
- Genus: Ernobius; Thomson, 1859

= Ernobius =

Genus of beetles

Ernobius is a genus of beetles in the family Ptinidae. There are about 90 species. Most occur in North America, Europe, and North Africa.

== Species ==
These 66 species belong to the genus Ernobius:

- Ernobius abietinus (Gyllenhal, 1808)^{g}
- Ernobius abietis (Fabricius, 1792)^{g}
- Ernobius alutaceus (LeConte, 1861)^{i c g}
- Ernobius angelinii Lohse, 1991^{g}
- Ernobius angusticollis (Ratzeburg, 1847)^{g}
- Ernobius benedikti
- Ernobius besucheti Zahradnik, 2000^{g}
- Ernobius bicolor White, 1983^{i c g}
- Ernobius californicus Fisher, 1919^{i c g}
- Ernobius caudatus Van Dyke, 1923^{i c g}
- Ernobius collaris Fall, 1905^{i c g}
- Ernobius conicola Fisher, 1919^{i c g}
- Ernobius convergens Fall, 1905^{i c g}
- Ernobius crotchii Fall, 1905^{i c g}
- Ernobius cupressi Chobaut, 1899^{g}
- Ernobius cyprogenius
- Ernobius debilis LeConte, 1865^{i c g}
- Ernobius explanatus (Mannerheim, 1843)^{g}
- Ernobius filicornis LeConte, 1879^{i c g}
- Ernobius fissuratus Fall, 1905^{i c g}
- Ernobius freudei Lohse, 1970^{g}
- Ernobius fulvus C.Johnson, 1975^{g}
- Ernobius gallicus C.Johnson, 1975^{g}
- Ernobius gentilis Fall, 1905^{i c g}
- Ernobius gigas (Mulsant & Rey, 1863)^{g}
- Ernobius gracilis LeConte, 1879^{i c g}
- Ernobius granulatus LeConte, 1865^{i c g b}
- Ernobius hirsutus White, 1966^{i c g}
- Ernobius impressithorax Pic, 1902^{g}
- Ernobius jaroslavli Logvinovskiy, 1977^{g}
- Ernobius juniperi Chobaut, 1899^{g}
- Ernobius kailidisi Johnson, 1975^{g}
- Ernobius kiesenwetteri Schilsky, 1898^{g}
- Ernobius lacustris Fall, 1905^{i c g}
- Ernobius laticollis Pic, 1927^{g}
- Ernobius longicornis (Sturm, 1837)^{g}
- Ernobius lucidus (Mulsant & Rey, 1863)^{g}
- Ernobius luteipennis LeConte, 1879^{i c g}
- Ernobius madoni Pic, 1930^{g}
- Ernobius melanoventris Ruckes, 1957^{i c g}
- Ernobius mollis (Linnaeus, 1758)^{i c g b} (pine bark anobiid)
- Ernobius montanus Fall, 1905^{i c g}
- Ernobius mulsanti Kiesenwetter, 1877^{g}
- Ernobius nigrans Fall, 1905^{i c g}
- Ernobius nigrinus (Sturm, 1837)^{g}
- Ernobius oculeus Toskina, 2002^{g}
- Ernobius oertzeni Schilsky, 1900^{g}
- Ernobius opicus Fall, 1905^{i c g}
- Ernobius pallidipennis Pic, 1902^{g}
- Ernobius pallitarsis Fall, 1905^{i c g}
- Ernobius parens (Mulsant & Rey, 1863)^{g}
- Ernobius parvus White, 1966^{i c g}
- Ernobius pini (Sturm, 1837)^{g}
- Ernobius pinicola Ruckes, 1957^{i c g}
- Ernobius pruinosus (Mulsant & Rey, 1863)^{g}
- Ernobius punctulatus (LeConte, 1859)^{i c g}
- Ernobius reflexus (Mulsant & Rey, 1863)^{g}
- Ernobius robusticornis Maran, 1941^{g}
- Ernobius rufus (Illiger, 1807)^{g}
- Ernobius schedli Brown, 1932^{i c g}
- Ernobius socialis Fall, 1905^{i c g}
- Ernobius subopacus Pic, 1904^{g}
- Ernobius tenuicornis LeConte, 1865^{i c g}
- Ernobius tristis LeConte, 1879^{i c g}
- Ernobius vinolasi Novoa & Baselga, 2000^{g}
- Ernobius youngi

Data sources: i = ITIS, c = Catalogue of Life, g = GBIF, b = Bugguide.net
