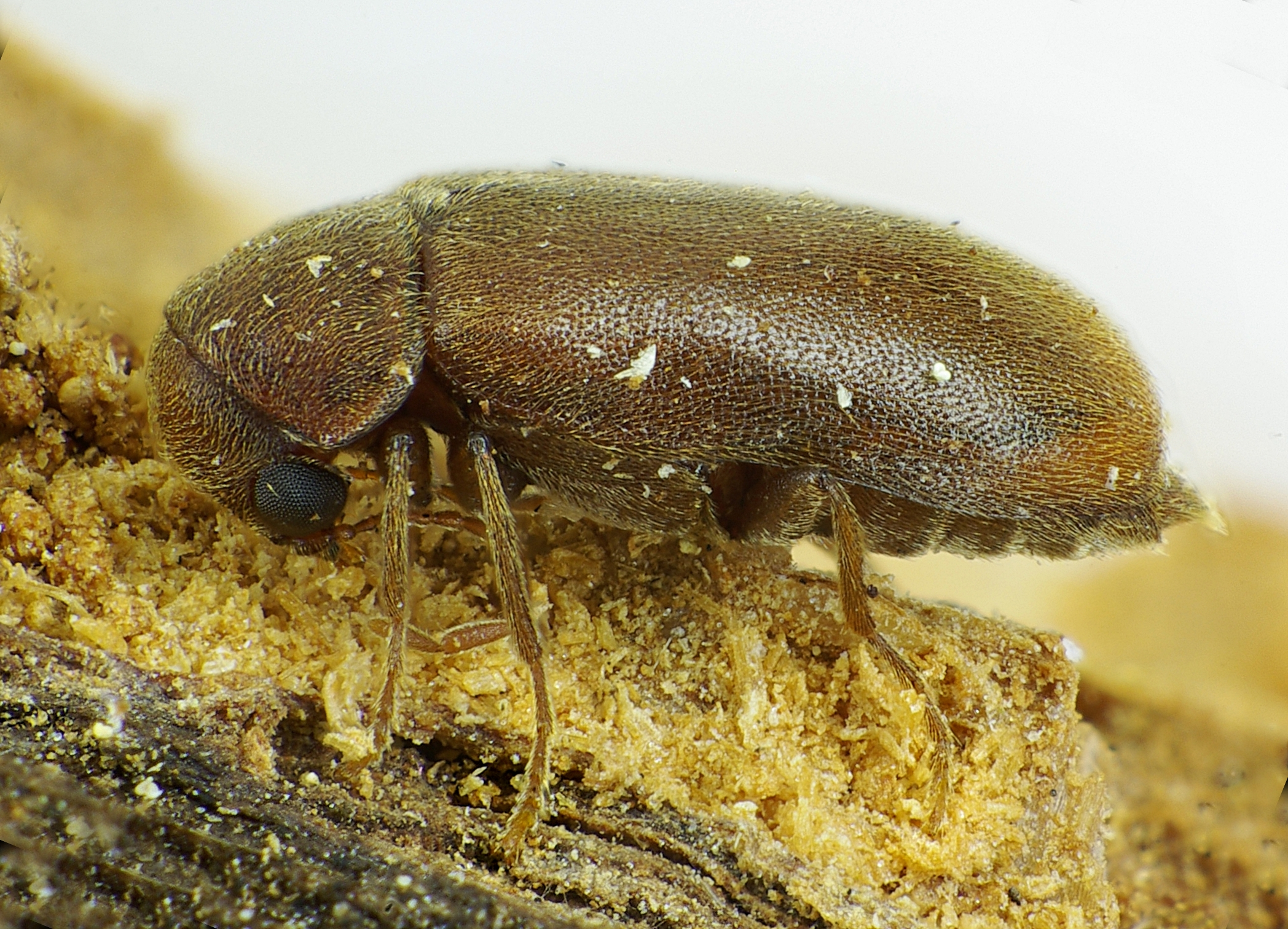
- Ernobius mollis sideview

Scientific classification
- Kingdom: Animalia
- Phylum: Arthropoda
- Class: Insecta
- Order: Coleoptera
- Suborder: Polyphaga
- Family: Ptinidae
- Genus: Ernobius
- Species: E. mollis

Binomial name
- Ernobius mollis (Linnaeus, 1758)

Synonyms
- Ernobius consimilis (Gmelin, 1790); Ernobius convexifrons (Kugelann, 1792); Ernobius reversus (Melsheimer, 1846); Ernobius sybaris Mulsant and Rey, 1863; Ernobius tarsatus Kraatz, 1881; Ernobius testaceus Sharp, 1916

= Ernobius mollis =

Species of beetle

Ernobius mollis, also known as the pine bark anobiid, pine knot borer, bark borer, or waney edge borer, is a species of beetle in the family Ptinidae.

== Subspecies ==
These two subspecies belong to the species Ernobius mollis:

- Ernobius mollis espanoli Johnson, 1975^{g}
- Ernobius mollis mollis (Linnaeus, 1758)^{g}

Data sources: i = ITIS, c = Catalogue of Life, g = GBIF, b = Bugguide.net
