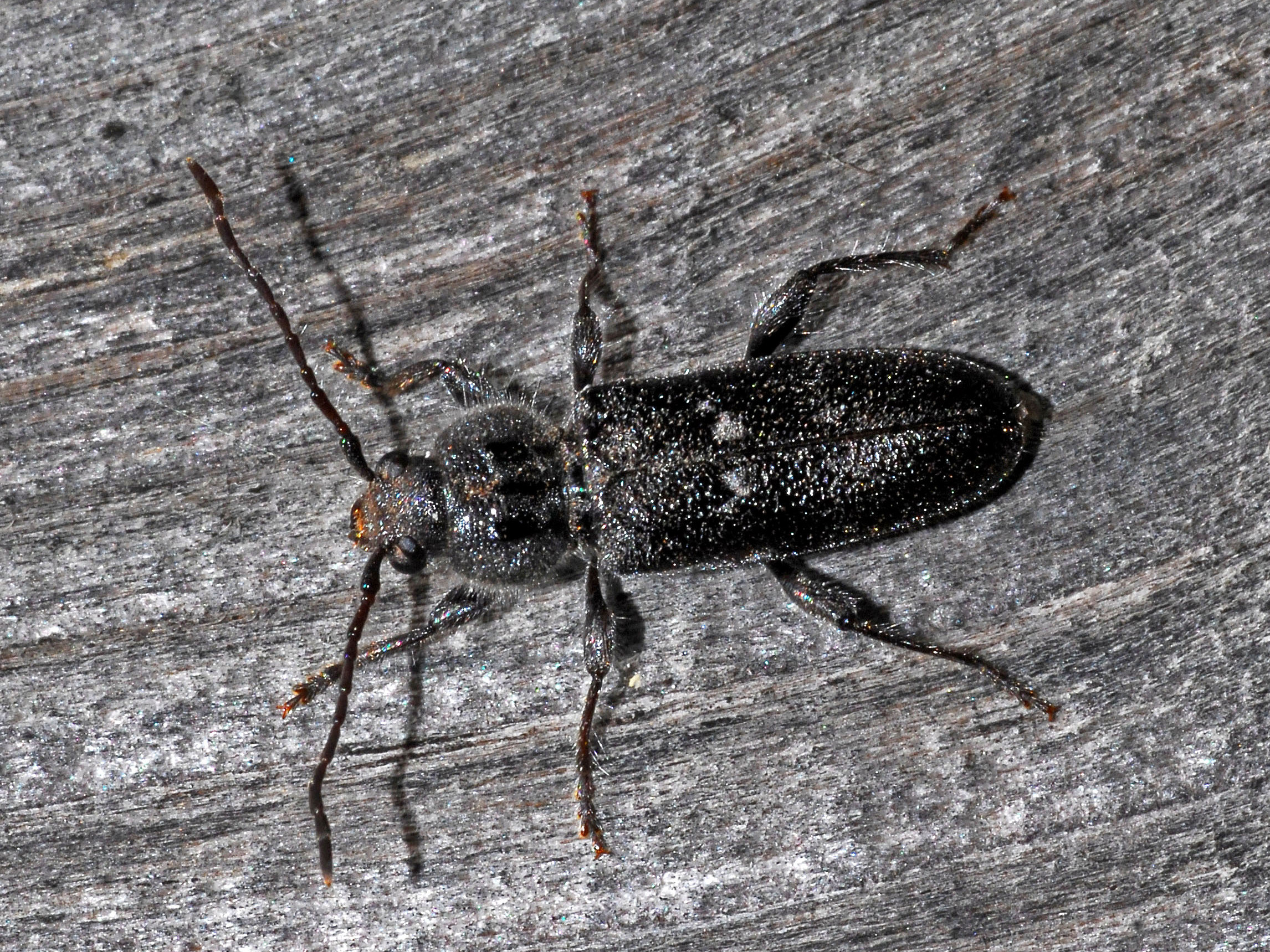
- Male
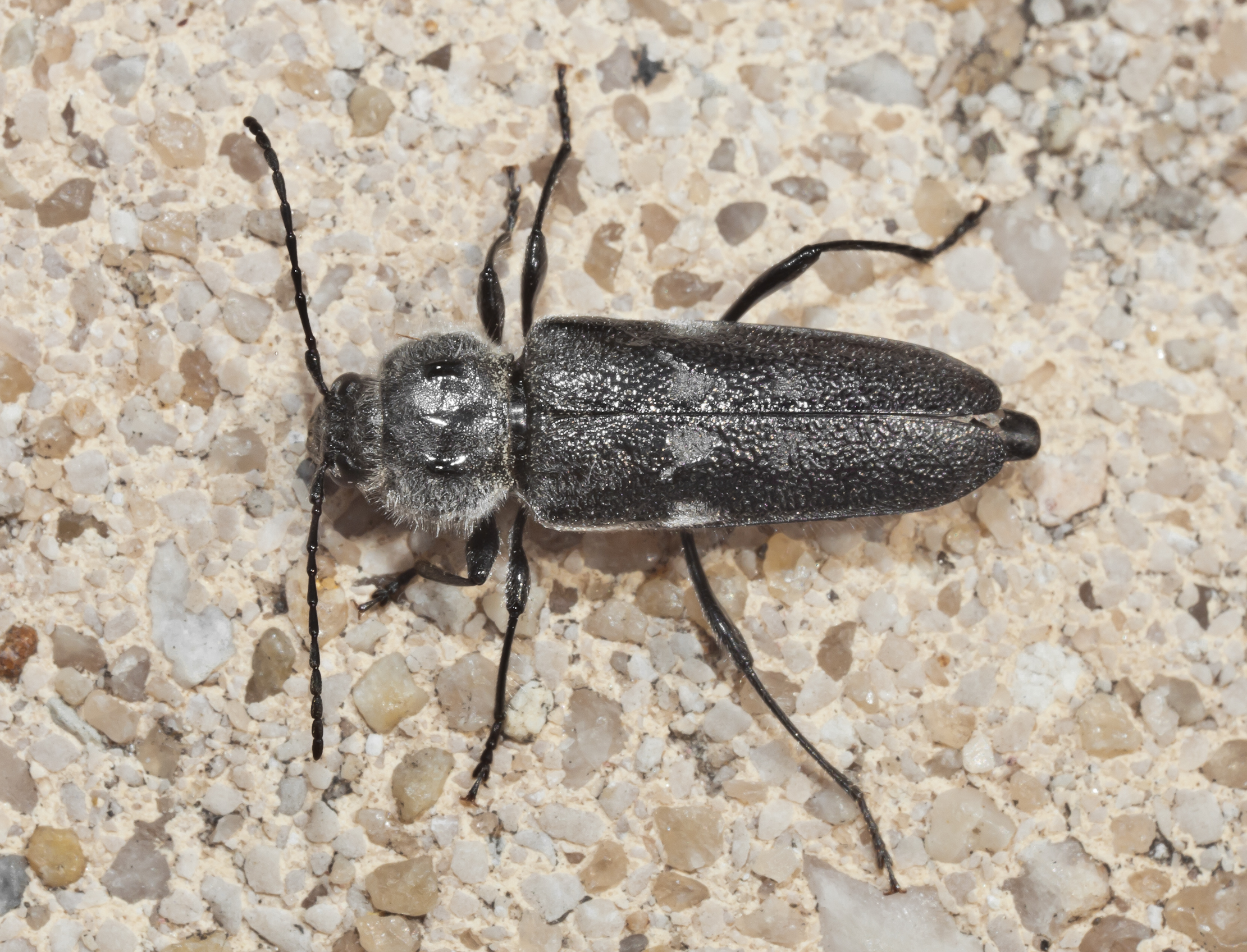
- Female

Scientific classification
- Kingdom: Animalia
- Phylum: Arthropoda
- Clade: Pancrustacea
- Class: Insecta
- Order: Coleoptera
- Suborder: Polyphaga
- Infraorder: Cucujiformia
- Family: Cerambycidae
- Subfamily: Cerambycinae
- Tribe: Hylotrupini
- Genus: Hylotrupes; Audinet-Serville, 1834
- Species: H. bajulus

Binomial name
- Hylotrupes bajulus (Linnaeus, 1758)

= Hylotrupes =

Hylotrupes bajulus

Genus of beetles

Hylotrupes is a monotypic genus of woodboring beetles in the family Cerambycidae, the longhorn beetles. The sole species, Hylotrupes bajulus, is known by several common names, including house longhorn beetle, old house borer, and European house borer. In South Africa it also is known as the Italian beetle due to their introduction to the environment by way of infested packing cases that had originated from Italy. Hylotrupes is the only genus in the tribe Hylotrupini.

== Distribution ==
This species, originating in Europe, and having been spread in timber and wood products, now has a practically cosmopolitan distribution, including Southern Africa, Asia, the Americas, Australia, and much of Europe and the Mediterranean.

== Description ==
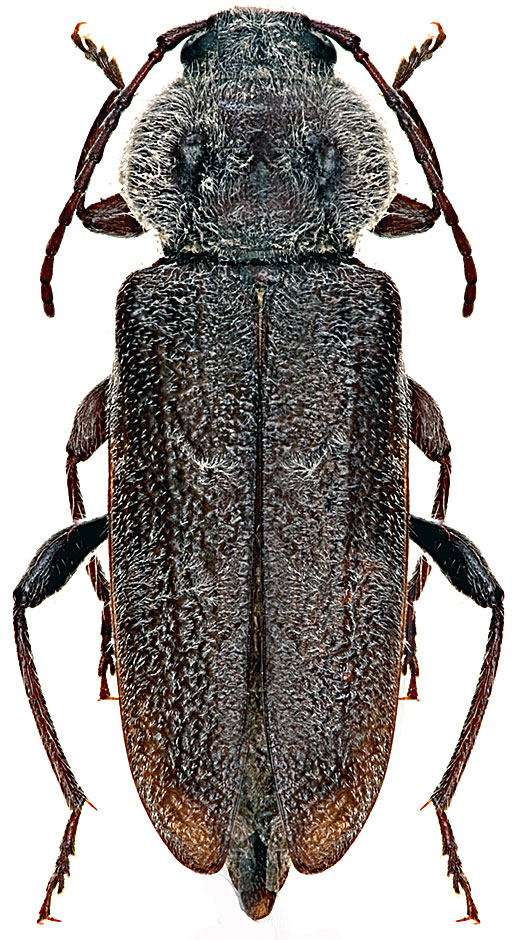
Mounted specimen

Hylotrupes bajulus can reach a body length of about 8–20 mm (0.31–0.79 in), while mature larvae can reach 30 mm (1.2 in). These beetles are brown to black, appearing grey because of a fine grey furriness on most of the upper surface. On the pronotum two conspicuously hairless tubercles are characteristic of the species. On the elytra usually there are two whitish pubescent spots. Females do not have a real ovipositor, only a little more elongated telson. The species can be defined polymorphic, having an extreme variability, both in the dimensions and in the aspect. In small specimens the pubescent spots on the elytra disappear almost completely and the legs and antennae turn to a reddish color.

== Biology ==
Eating sounds of an old-house borer

Adults are most active in the summer (June–September). Only the larvae feed on the wood, with a preference for dead wood of pines (Pinus), fir, spruce (Picea abies), Araucaria and Pseudotsuga species. Ecologically it can be quite important as a scavenger of dead pine trees, pine fence posts, and similar objects, hastening their decay and collapse. The life cycle from egg to beetle typically takes two to ten years, depending on the type of wood, its age and quality, its moisture content, and also depending on environmental conditions such as temperature. Larvae usually pupate just beneath the wood surface and eclose in mid to late summer. Once the exoskeleton of the newly emerged adult beetle has hardened sufficiently the adults cut oval exit holes 6–10 mm (¼ to 3/8 in) in diameter, typically leaving coarse, powdery frass in the vicinity of the hole.

Hylotrupes bajulus preferentially attacks freshly produced sapwood of softwood timber. Contrary to the name "old-house borer", the species is more often found in new houses; maybe because the beetles are attracted to the higher resin content of wood harvested more recently than 10 years earlier. If old wood is attacked, the damage is usually greater. As the nutrient content of wood decreases with age, the larvae have to consume larger amounts of wood.

In Australia, the infection of home construction is mainly caused by the use of wood already infected with the eggs or larvae of the beetles if the wood is not properly kiln-dried in production.

== Gallery ==
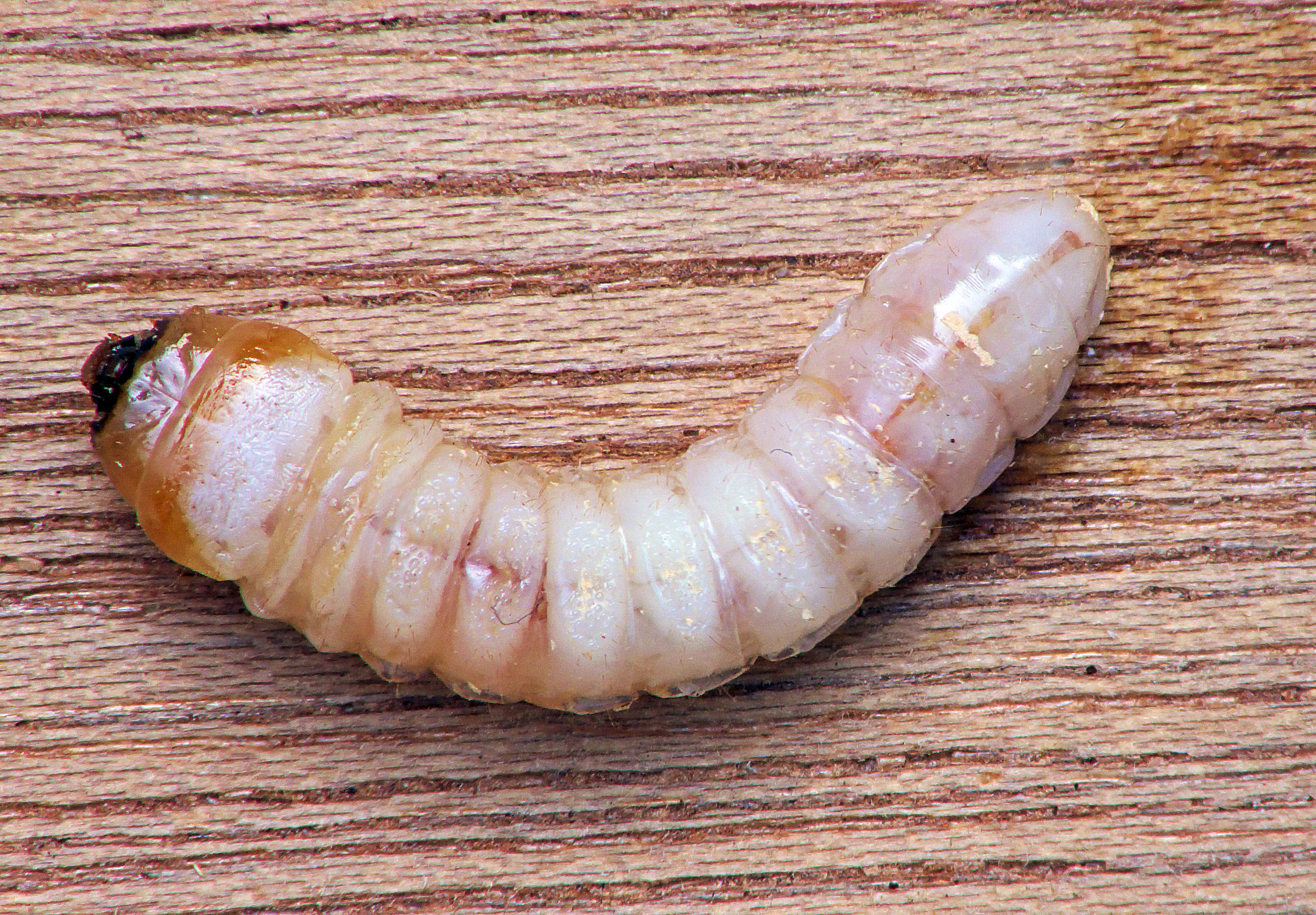
Larva

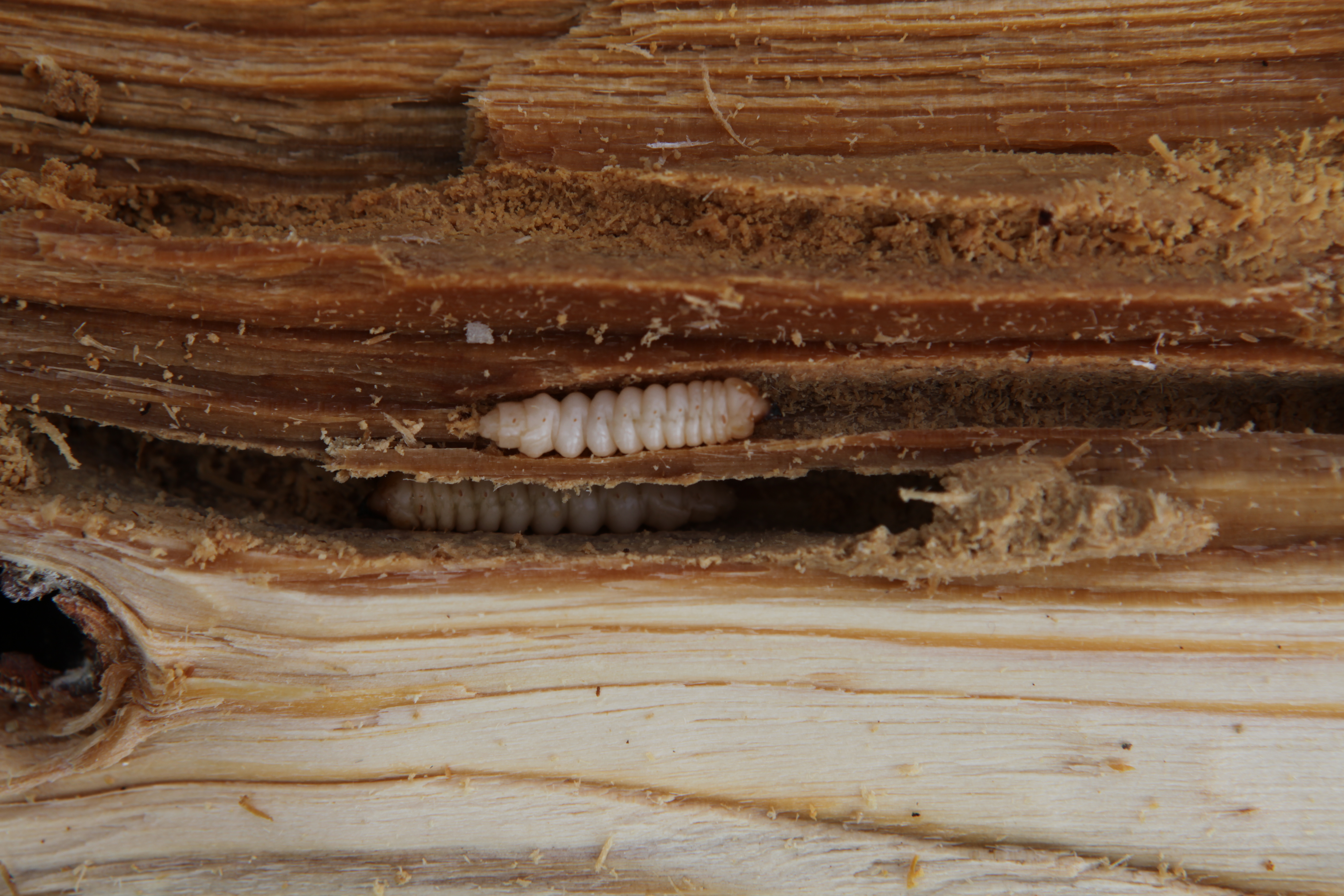
Larvae exposed in infested wood

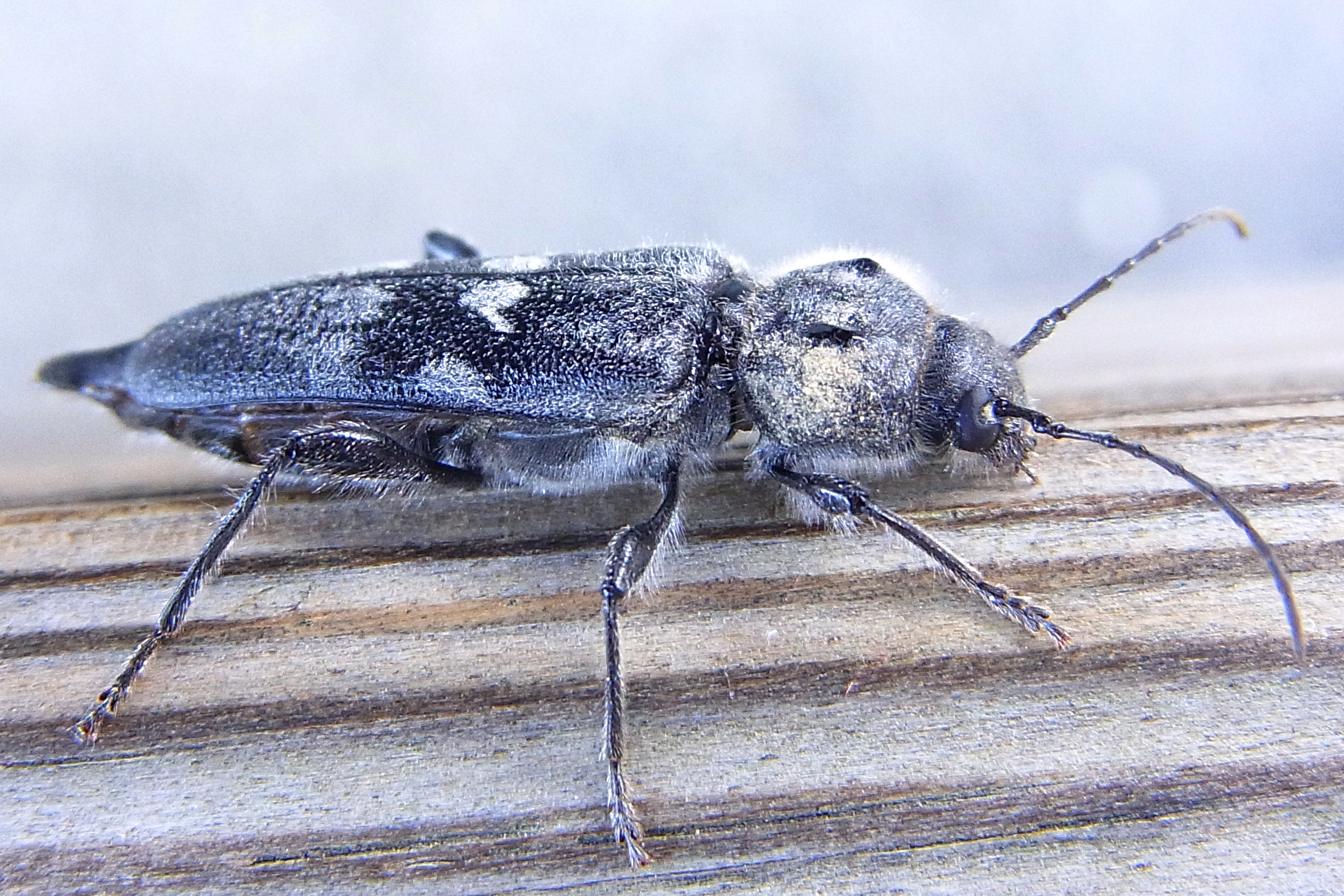
Adult – side view

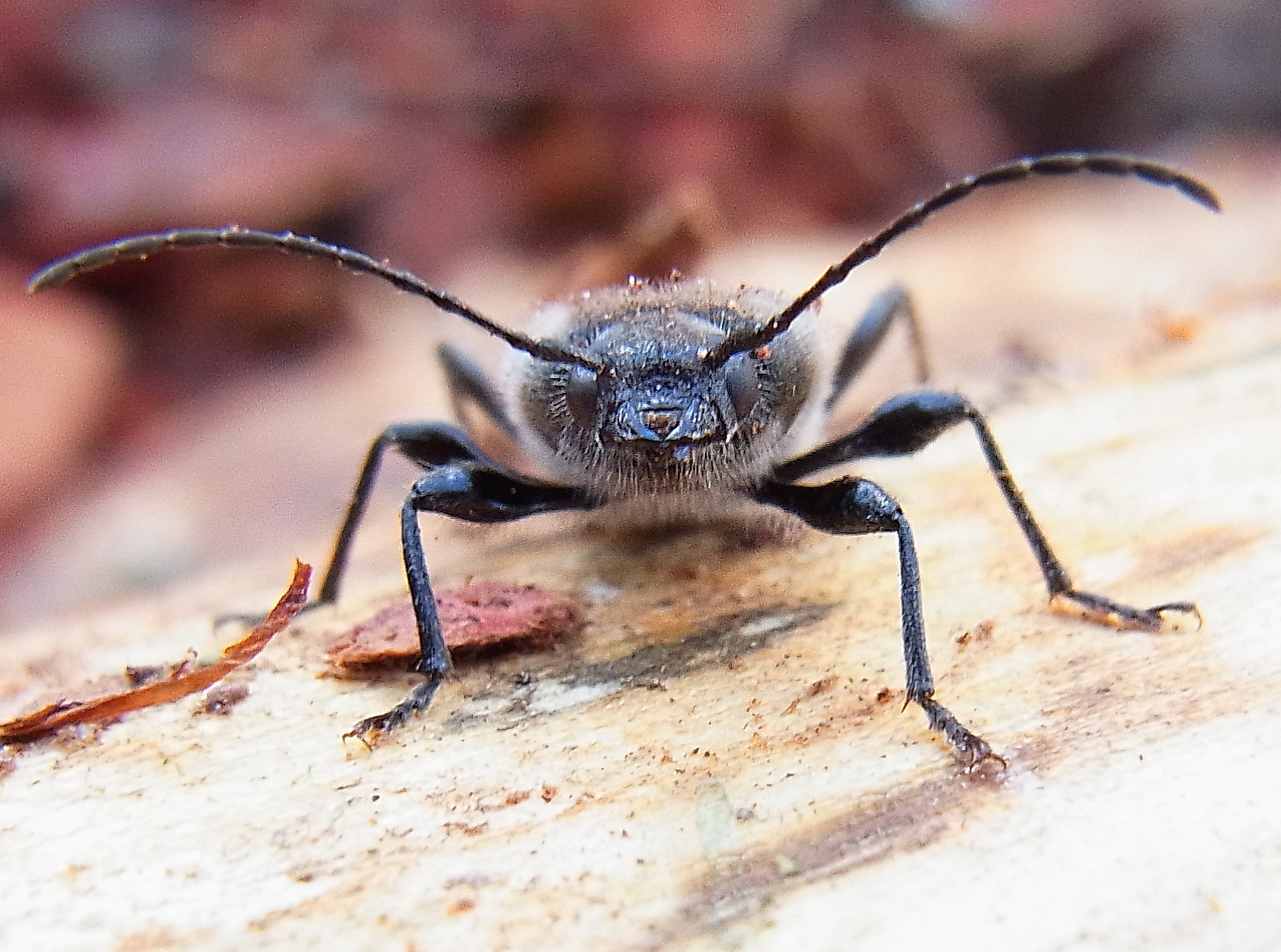
Adult– front view
