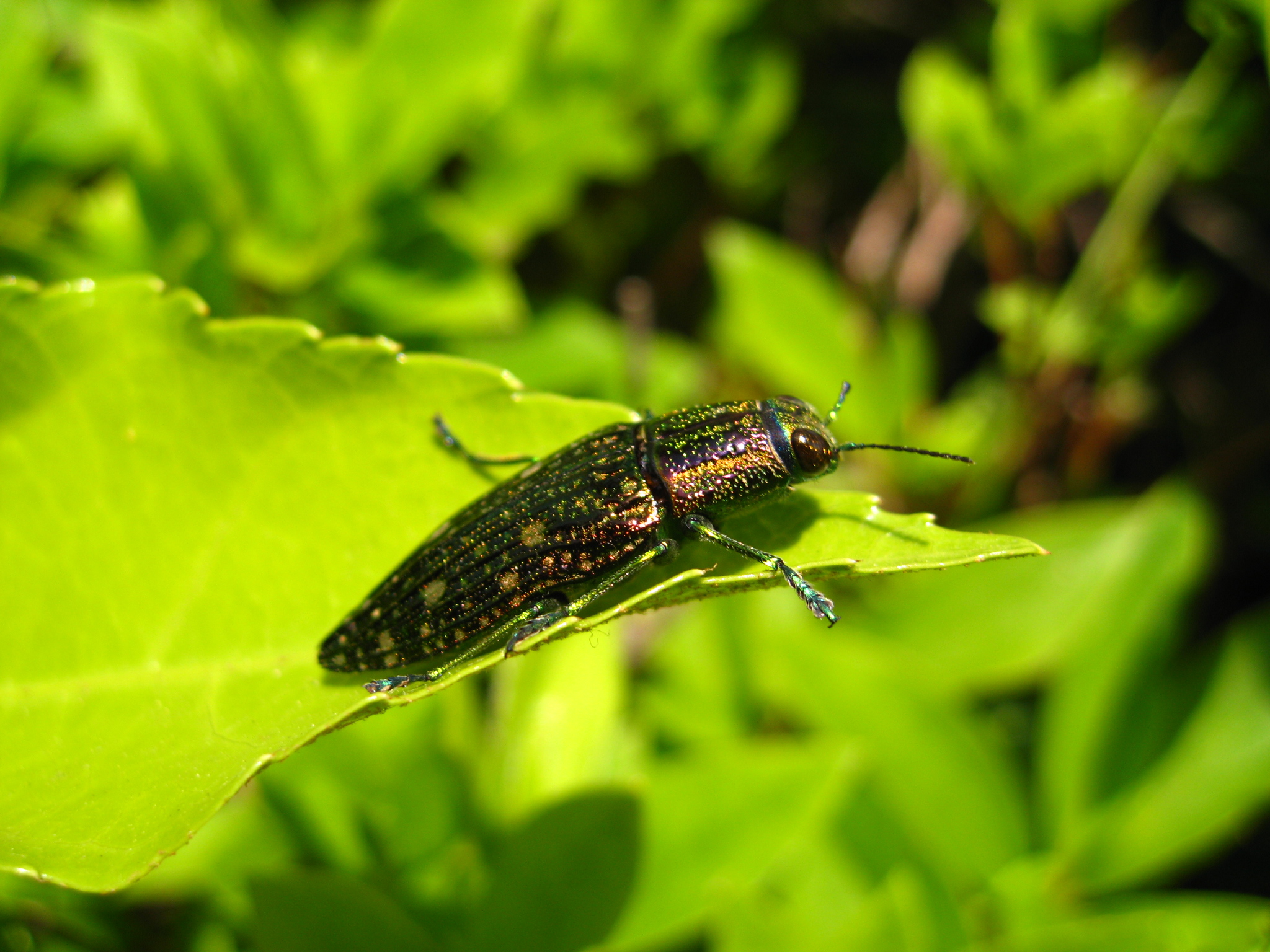
- An "ubatamamushi" beetle in Kyoto

Scientific classification
- Kingdom: Animalia
- Phylum: Arthropoda
- Clade: Pancrustacea
- Class: Insecta
- Order: Coleoptera
- Suborder: Polyphaga
- Infraorder: Elateriformia
- Family: Buprestidae
- Genus: Chalcophora
- Species: C. japonica

Binomial name
- Chalcophora japonica Gory, 1840

= Chalcophora japonica =

Species of beetle

Chalcophora japonica, or ubatamamushi in Japanese (Japanese kanji: 姥玉虫, katakana: ウバタマムシ; lit. 'nanny jewel bug'), also known as the flat-headed wood-borer, is a metallic, bullet-shaped, woodboring beetle of the Buprestidae family. It is endemic to Japan.

== Habitat and appearance ==
This insect is commonly found on the islands of Honshū, Shikoku and Kyūshū. The white, legless larvae are tadpole-shaped and grow to 8–50 millimetres (0.3–2.0 in) in length, while adults reach a length of 24–40 millimetres (0.9–1.6 in) in length and have brown and black stripes with gold flecks running the length of the body. This species is present from May through August and is attracted to sun, preferring to fly during the hottest part of the day, feeding on young buds and tree leaves.

== Reproduction ==
The larvae are ideally adapted to woodboring, being dorsally flattened with a broad thorax. Females lay approximately 75 eggs in the crevices of bark or on wounded trees and sometimes in the exposed beams of older houses where they become serious pests. The larvae tunnel under the tree bark where they vigorously feed on wood. The larval stage of this insect may last for many years. Occasionally males are selectively killed at the embryo stage by bacteria known as Wolbachia. This can result in a limited number of males in the population. Females lacking a male can then reproduce using an asexual form of reproduction known as parthenogenesis.

== See also ==
- Woodboring beetle
