= Blattabacterium =

Scientific classification
- Domain: Bacteria
- Kingdom: Pseudomonadati
- Phylum: Bacteroidota
- Class: Flavobacteriia
- Order: Flavobacteriales
- Family: Blattabacteriaceae; Kambhampati 2012
- Genus: Blattabacterium; Hollande and Favre 1931 (Approved Lists 1980)

Species
- "B. clevelandi" Clark and Kambhampati 2003; B. cuenoti (Mercier 1906) Hollande and Favre 1931 (Approved Lists 1980); "B. Blattabacterium punctulatus" Clark and Kambhampati 2003; "B. Blattabacterium relictus" Clark and Kambhampati 2003

Genus of bacteria

Blattabacterium is a genus of obligate mutualistic endosymbiont bacteria that are believed to inhabit all species of cockroach studied to date, with the exception of the genus Nocticola. The genus' presence in the termite Mastotermes darwiniensis led to speculation, later confirmed, that termites and cockroaches are evolutionarily linked.

== Diversity ==
Blattabacterium cuenoti was traditionally considered the only species in the genus Blattabacterium, which is in turn the only genus in the family Blattabacteriaceae. However, three new species have been described hosted by different species of cockroaches in the genus Cryptocercus:

- Blattabacterium relictus in Cryptocercus relictus
- B. clevelandi in C. clevelandi, and
- B. punctulatus in C. darwini, C. garciai, C. punctulatus and C. wrighti.

The ancient (~150 My) genus retains throughout a core set of metabolic genes. According to the GTDB, the many strains of the genus have nevertheless diverged enough at the sequence level to define around 40 "species" out of B. cuenoti alone.

In addition, newer genera have been found sufficiently closely related to the genus to warrant assignment to the same family by GTDB: Ca. "Karelsulcia", Ca. "Uzinura", Ca. "Walczuchella", all symbionts of insects.

== Function ==
Blattabacterium lives inside the fat cells of the fat bodies (tissues in the abdominal cavity that store fat) of its insect hosts. It serves a vital role in nitrogen recycling, which is important in insects that mainly live on plant material such as wood, which are poor in nitrogen. In insects, uric acid is a waste product of protein metabolism. After breakdown of uric acid by the host (and its other microbial flora, such as gut bacteria and fungi) into urea and/or ammonia, Blattabacterium recycles nitrogen by converting these products into glutamate, and using other raw materials from the host, is able to synthesize all of the essential amino acids and several vitamins. It appears to be transmitted to succeeding generations of the host by infection of the mother's eggs prior to their fertilization. When Blattabacterium was depleted within the host's fat bodies, there was an accumulation of urate showing Blattabacterium may be playing a role in regulating purine metabolism.

== Transmission ==
Generally, insect endosymbionts are transmitted vertically, where the mother will pass the endosymbiont to the offspring through the egg germ line. Therefore understanding host reproductive behavior is critical to understand how Blattabacterium is transmitted.

Cockroaches are a hugely diverse order of insects called Blattodea, within this order cockroaches exhibit range of reproductive behavior. Most cockroaches are oviparous, meaning they lay their eggs within their environment. Some roaches are ovoviviparous, where developing eggs remain inside the mother until they hatch. In rare cases cockroaches such as Diploptera punctata, have been observed as viviparous. Embryos develop in an egg sac within the mother and are supplied nutrients during development.
