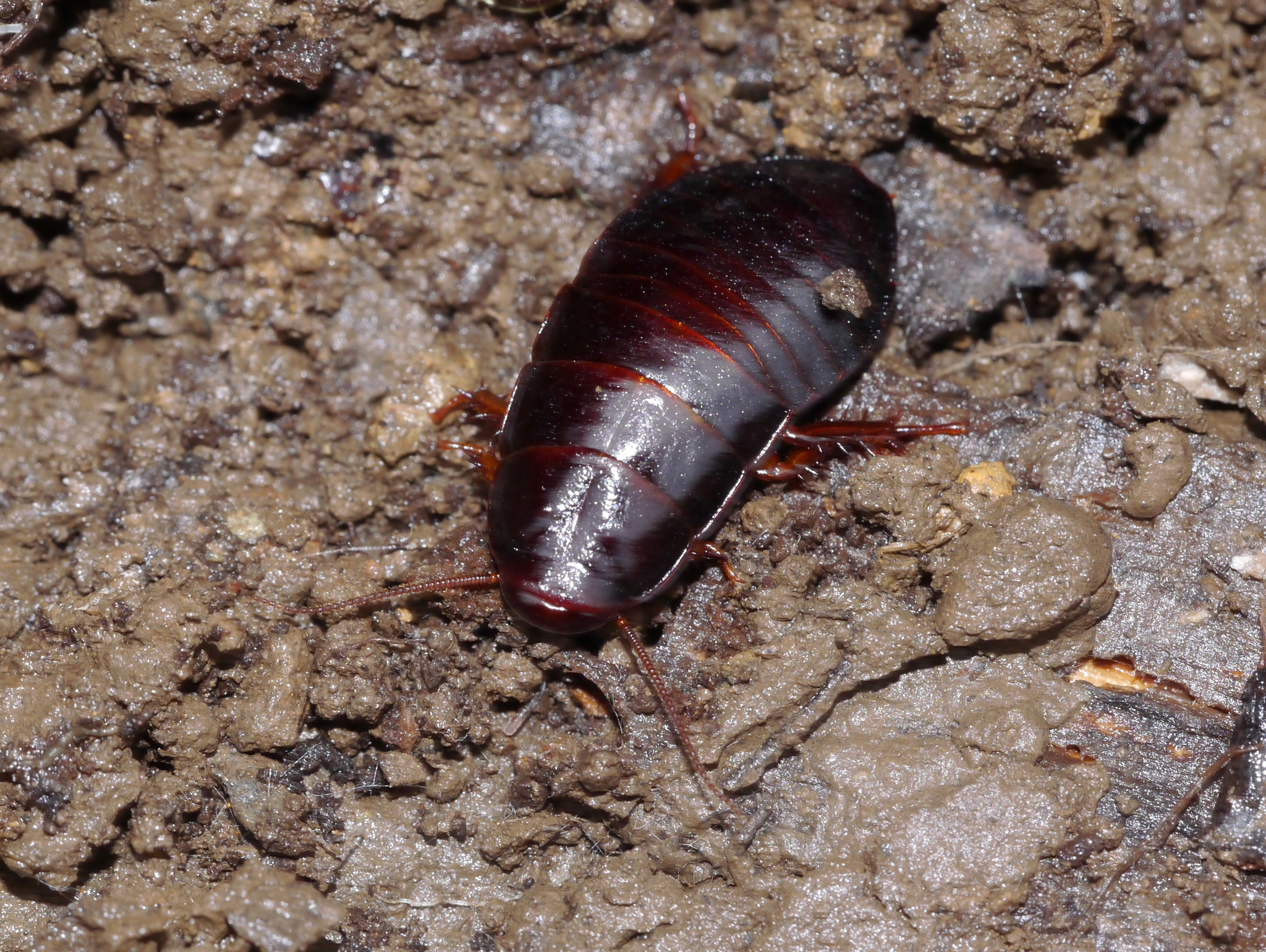

Scientific classification
- Kingdom: Animalia
- Phylum: Arthropoda
- Clade: Pancrustacea
- Class: Insecta
- Order: Blattodea
- Family: Cryptocercidae
- Genus: Cryptocercus
- Species: C. punctulatus

Binomial name
- Cryptocercus punctulatus Scudder, 1862

= Cryptocercus punctulatus =

Species of cockroach

Cryptocercus punctulatus, known generally as brown-hooded cockroach, is a species of cockroach in the family Cryptocercidae. Other common names include the woodroach, wingless wood roach, and eastern wood-eating cockroach. It is found in North America.

== Geographical distribution ==
C. punctulatus are distributed within the eastern United States of America, concentrated within the Appalachian Mountains of western Virginia and Pennsylvania. They share this habitat with three other closely related congeneric species, C. darwini, C. garciai, and C. wrighti, although no sympatry has been documented among the species. They inhabit temperate forests within the Appalachian Mountain Range and Allegheny Mountains in either deciduous forests or forests mixed with both deciduous and coniferous trees. They are predominantly found in elevations greater than 400 meters above sea level. C. punctulatus can be found in western Virginia, West Virginia, and Pennsylvania. They do not inhabit logs where the other species are found. Research has shown that C. punctulatus has diverged from C. darwini, C. garciai, and C. wrighti 13 to 38 million years ago. Because these are wingless cockroaches their distribution is limited by how far they can walk and the distance between fallen logs. C. punctulatus has inhabited these forests for tens of millions of years. There is evidence that C. punctulatus moved up and down the mountains with relation to glacial and interglacial periods.

== Habitat ==
C. punctulatus is a xylophagous cockroach that will live its entire life in moist dead logs that it consumes. They excavate extensive galleries within fallen logs with the gallery formations following the moistness of the logs. Specific spots in the log that are more dense will have fewer tunnels compared to softer areas. Fungi, for example brown rot fungi, have been noted in many logs and may represent the preference of C. punctulatus to choose logs with specific fungal species present. They live in either deciduous or coniferous logs. C. punctulatus has been collected from all montane elevations where trees exist within the Appalachian Mountains, and within 11 species of coniferous trees. The ability to inhabit both deciduous and coniferous trees allows them greater variability due to climate change. They will be found in older areas of forests as they require already dead and fallen trees and cannot live in regenerating areas full of young trees. They play a vital role in forest health by decomposing dead logs allowing for nutrients to be leached back into the soil.

== Morphology ==
C. punctulatus is an oviparous cockroach in the family Cryptocercidae that excavates galleries in rotten wood. The genus Cryptocercus is closely related to termites, believed that their life habits and gut symbiosis is ancestral. Both males and females are wingless, brown to black coloration, and vary in size from 23–30 mm in length. C. punctulatus found in its geographical range are found to be a cryptic species complex with four different karyotypes (2n=37, 2n=39, 2n=43, 2n=45), although still considered one species. Despite the genetic differences, all karyotypes of C. punctulatus are phenotypically the same, and have the same behavior and life history.

== Reproduction and parental care ==
C. punctulatus are a subsocial organism, of which they provide basic bi-parental care for their eggs, larvae, and young. Field evidence suggests that pairs of C. punctulatus have a single reproductive episode during which they produce a mean of 73 eggs, in up to four oothecae. Forming mate pairs when they reach maturity, they will produce their first, and usually only batch of offspring one year later. An extended period of brood care, which can last three years or longer, follows and includes defense of the family, gallery excavation, sanitation of the nest and, in the early stages, trophallactic feeding of the young.

Nymphs are born without the cellulolytic protozoan symbionts they require to digest their wood diet; consequently, neonates rely on adults for nourishment. The altricial extreme of the developmental spectrum in cockroaches is currently represented by Cryptocercus punctulatus: this species hatches eyeless, with a pale, thin cuticle, is defended by parents in a nest, and is dependent on parents for symbionts and nourishment.

C. punctulatus require 5–6 years to reach reproductive maturity. They may be considered "the best living model of the ancestral state of termites" and give insight into "the role of parental care in the evolution of termite eusociality."

== Bacteria gut symbiosis ==
C. punctulatus is thought to be the most resemblance of the common ancestor between termites and cockroaches largely due to their gut symbionts. Within the digestive system of C. punctulatus are obligate and unique flagellates, commonly Hypermastigida, that can digest the cellulose in wood that the cockroach consumes as their primary diet. In addition to the unique flagellates, bacteriocytes, common in other cockroach species, are also found, making Cryptocercus the only cockroaches with double gut symbiosis. The behaviour of proctodeal trophallaxis, the transfer of hind-gut fluids from the rectal pouch to the mouth of a receiver, allows for the vertical transmission of symbionts. The acquisition of the symbionts occurs early in development stages with the adult parental care and feeding the young instars via proctodeal trophallaxis, as well as the loss of symbionts during molting, the regaining of healthy symbiont abundance is acquired the same way. The trophallaxis behavior is believed to be a large part of the development of social behaviors among species, and important in the study of evolutionary history of symbiosis.
