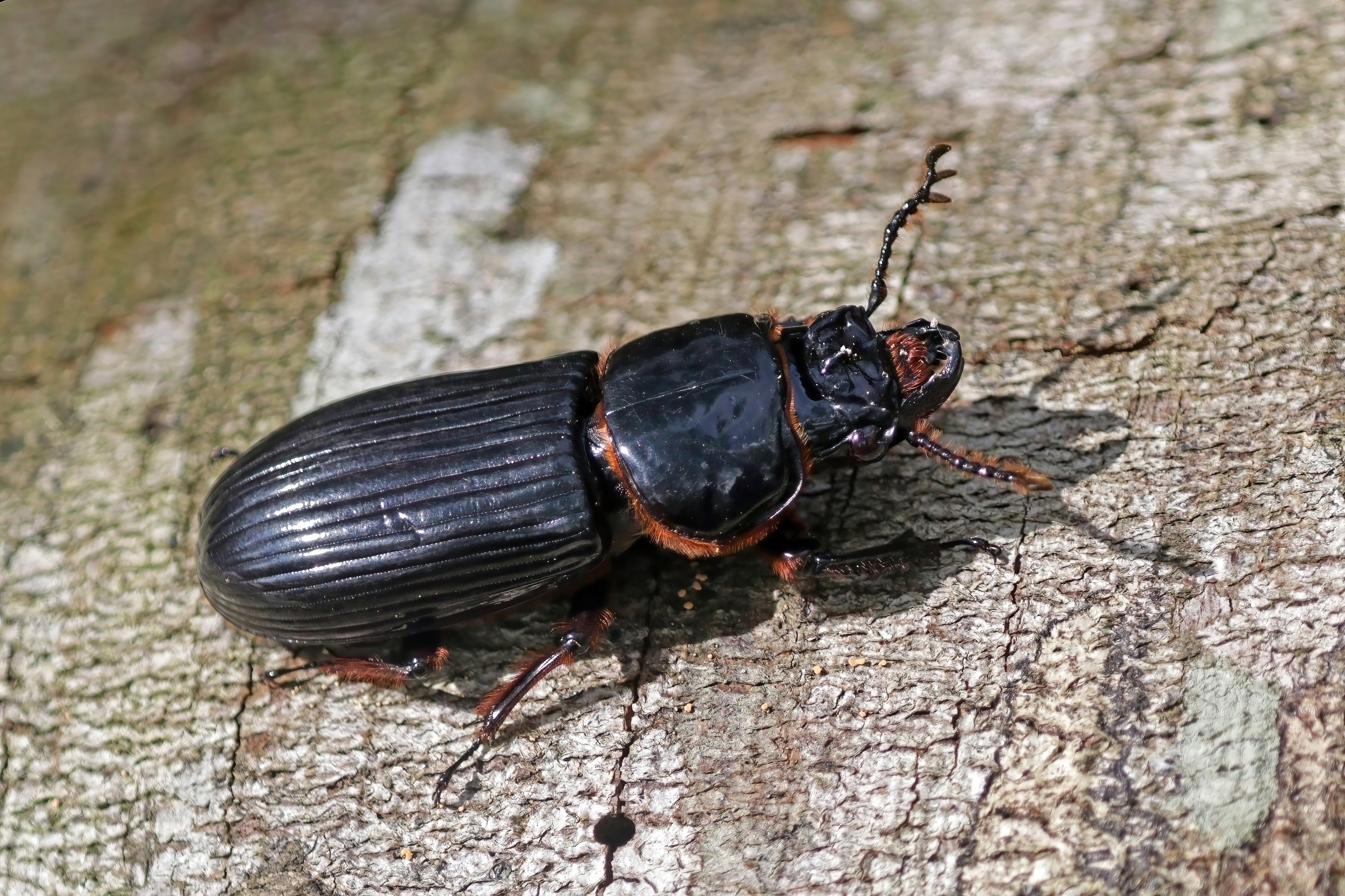
- Near Kota Kinabatangan River, Borneo, Malaysia

Scientific classification
- Kingdom: Animalia
- Phylum: Arthropoda
- Clade: Pancrustacea
- Class: Insecta
- Order: Coleoptera
- Suborder: Polyphaga
- Infraorder: Scarabaeiformia
- Family: Passalidae
- Genus: Odontotaenius
- Species: O. disjunctus

Binomial name
- Odontotaenius disjunctus (Illiger, 1800)

Synonyms
- Passalus disjunctus; Popilius disjunctus; Passalus cornutus Fabricius, 1801

= Odontotaenius disjunctus =

Patent-leather beetle

Species of beetle

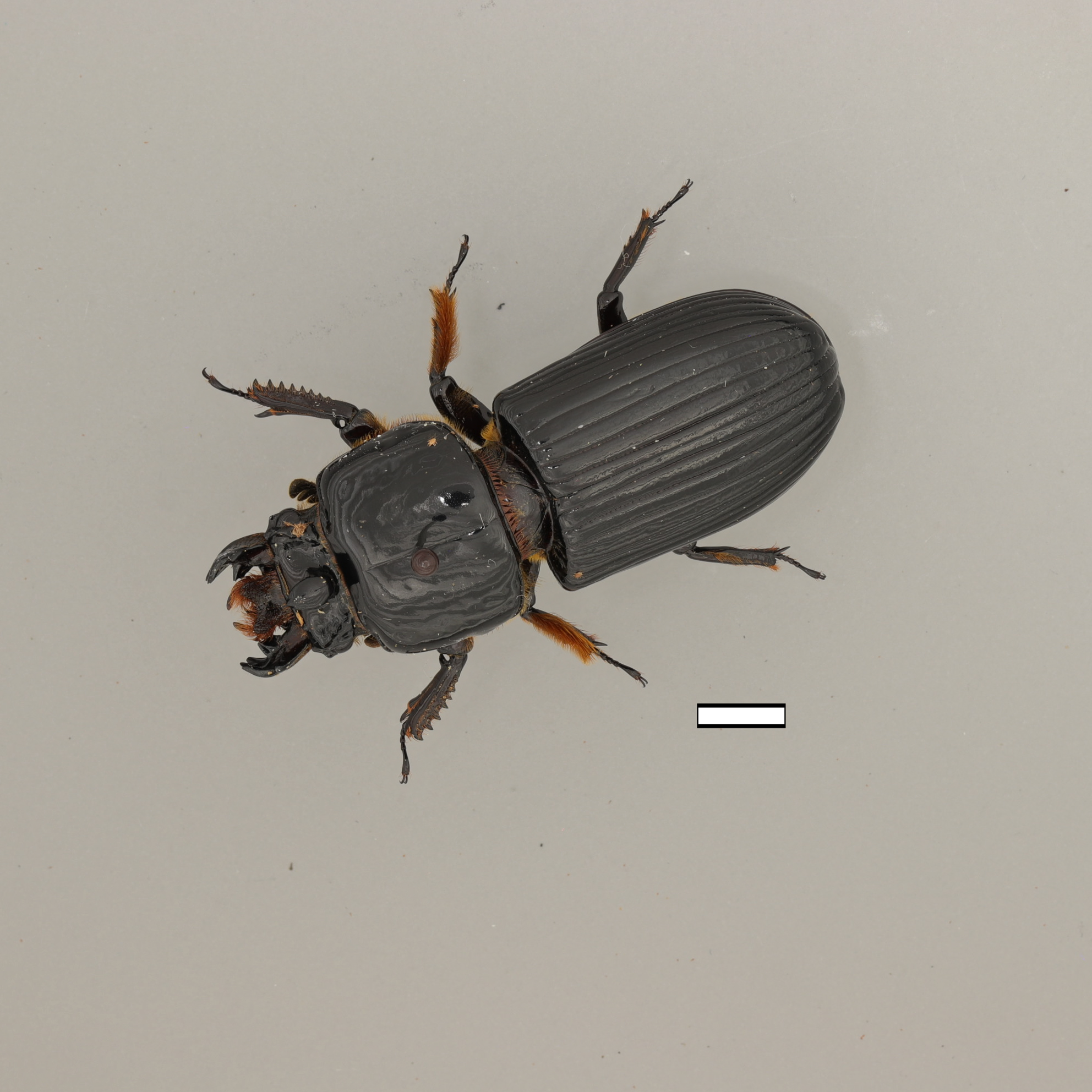
Odontotaenius disjunctus

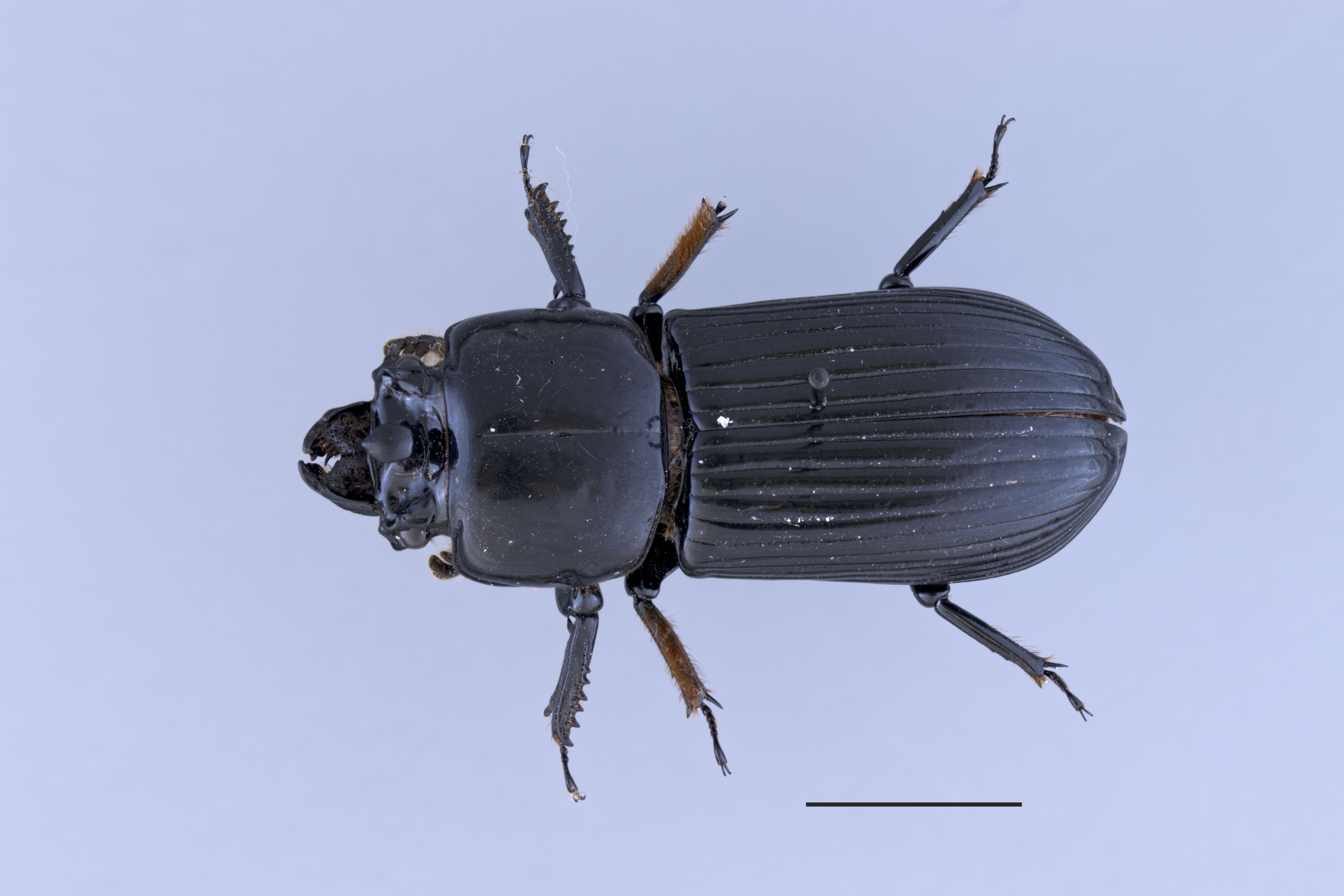
Image of Odontotaenius disjunctus (Illiger, 1800), collected from a wood shed in Haddock, GA. Scale bar represents 1 cm.

Odontotaenius disjunctus, the patent-leather beetle or horned passalus, is a saproxylic beetle in the family Passalidae (bess beetles) which can grow to over 3 cm long, weigh 1-2 grams and are capable of pulling 50 times their own weight. They have been used to study several aspects of general family characteristics since the early 1900s but remain a relatively unknown species within the diverse Coleoptera order.

== Distribution ==
Odontotaenius disjunctus is most commonly found in climates with higher humidity, mainly in the warmer parts of both hemispheres, and also widely distributed in temperate North American forests. O. disjunctus beetles are usually found under, or inside, old logs or stumps and are rarely observed outside of their wooden habitats.

== General life history ==
These beetles can be found in rotting logs, especially of oak and hickory. This specific locale offers unique benefits in regards to protection from predators and external abiotic factors such temperature and precipitation. There is a level of stability with the two factors mentioned, the water retention in the wood helps to keep temperatures stable while aiding in further decomposition of the log itself. The regulation of this environment allows for both day and night activity. Larvae can reach adulthood in as little as 3 months due to a rich food source, with the average lifespan of an adulthood being up to one year. Adults are only found outside of their log when they are searching for a new mate, or a new log in which to burrow. Daily movements tend to be limited to within their log, any movements outside of the log are not as predictable and occur much less frequently.

== Biology ==
These beetles are shiny black, and have many long grooves on their elytra. They have a small horn between their eyes, and clubbed antennae. Females and males are difficult to distinguish based on external appearances alone. There appears to be little to no sexual dimorphism between the two sexes, both tend to be equal in size and overall strength capabilities. Their large size may be in part a result of exploiting a niche that provides an unlimited food source of rotting wood material. Although flight is possible, these beetles predominantly walk as their main form of locomotion, they will walk long distances rather than flying. Parasitic infections are common but not well known, external and internal parasites have been documented. A nematode parasite, Chondronema passali, inhabits the abdominal cavity has been shown to effect stress responses in these beetles, although the results are relatively small, they do show that O. disjunctus is not only infected by parasites but are negatively impacted by them. Males will often compete for females and territory like most beetle species, using their horn-like structure to flip and overturn their opponents. The strength of these beetles also tends to increase in times of stress, however, even in times without stimulation male beetles will exert an impressive amount of force onto a target.

== Feeding habits ==
Patent-leather beetles like to eat logs of certain trees, in which the wood is dead and decaying. They eat deciduous trees, such as oaks and elm. Wood inhabited by these beetles is usually well decomposed and falls apart readily. This unique food source prevents competition as these beetles have chosen a food source that is not highly sought after by other organisms due to the material being indigestible for most. Adults feed primarily on wood, while larvae stages eat materials composed of fungi, wood and parental secretions. Wood consumed by the beetles is digested with the help of a "fiber-associated microbiome" in the anterior hindgut that is composed of Lactococcus and Turicibacter. Interestingly, their ecology and approach to symbiotic digestion is similar to wood-feeding cockroaches of the subfamily Panesthiinae, that also appear to rely on a similar contribution from their hindgut microbiomes. Burrowing within rotting logs offers the triturated wood that is a staple in the diet of these beetles, this wood is consumed widely by the males and then further broken down through the digestive tract, and eventually expelled for the eventual re- consumption by all family members.

== Social systems ==
When disturbed, adults can produce a squeaking sound by rubbing their wings on the abdomen. This is called stridulation, and is often easy to hear, both adult and larvae are capable of producing these sounds. This is used for communication within the colony, to communicate danger, courtship, disturbance and solo activities. These four general categories can be further examined into more specific signals and patterns. The acoustic repertoire of O. disjunctus can be broken down into bars, pulses and phonatomes, these are used to identify intra- and interspecific variations. These sounds are produced specifically from when areas of the sixth abdominal tergite rasp against an area on the ventral side of each folded metathoracic wing.

Many patent-leather beetles may live together in a colony in the same log and several colonies may be found within the same rotting log depending on the size. However, only one pair of beetles is typically found in a single tunnel/burrow system, but a single large log may offer space for multiple pairs to be present.

== Reproduction ==
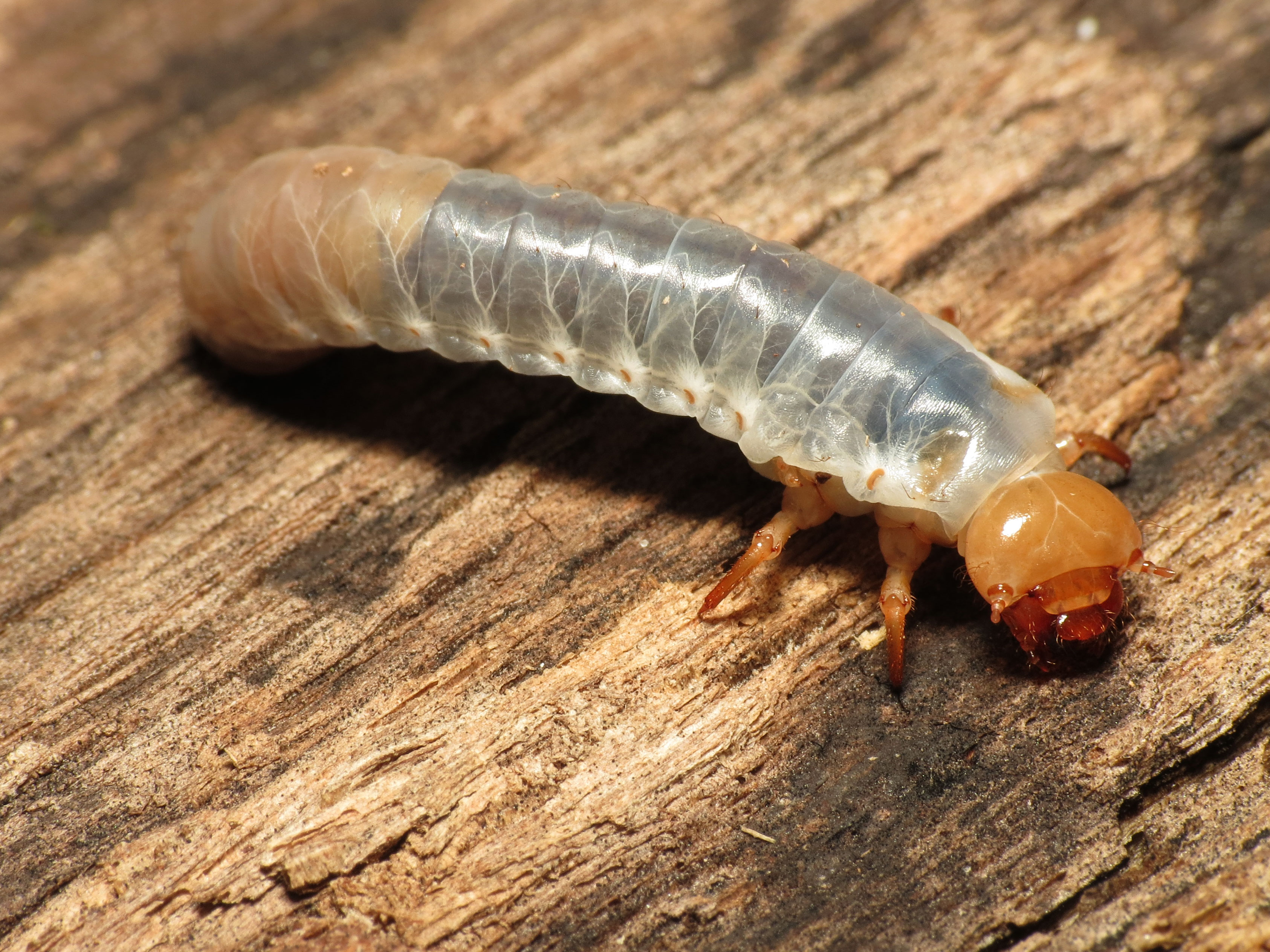
Odontotaenius disjunctus larva

These beetles make tunnels in the wood; inside the galleries, the beetles will mate, lay eggs, and watch over their offspring. The adults feed the larvae a chewed-up mixture of wood chips and feces. The larvae cannot feed themselves and take a year to develop. Being presocial beetles, the larvae are typically taken care of by the parents and young offspring. This cooperative brood care is beneficial to all individuals involved, larvae receive optimal care and young adults are able remain in the burrow to increase fitness and wait for favorable conditions before exiting the log.

Offspring rely heavily on parental care for protection and nourishment, food is mixed with secretions by the parent before the larvae can feed. Reproduction appears to be affected by seasonality, with summer months being the time in which females lay the majority of their eggs. O. disjunctus remain in monogamous pairs; during the breeding season (early spring until late summer) they will repeatedly copulate and produce anywhere from 20 to 35 eggs over the time period. Offspring remain in the parental tunnel for the rest of the year, overwinter, and then disperse in the following late spring. Infanticidal behavior has been observed and is most likely to occur in the event of a burrow takeover by a male or female that has not yet had the chance to mate due to limited access to an empty burrow.

== Anthropological impacts ==
The patent-leather beetle is considered beneficial in its activities to decompose dead wood, and is harmless to humans. The increase in habitat loss due to deforestation for agriculture has caused a decline in populations as they do not react well to fragmentation. Studies reveal that a decrease in suitable habitat and increased open areas between forests have been the two leading causes of population decline and potential extirpation of some areas. Shrinking habitat would also cause an increase in competition and infanticidal behaviors, further straining reproductive success.

== Gallery ==
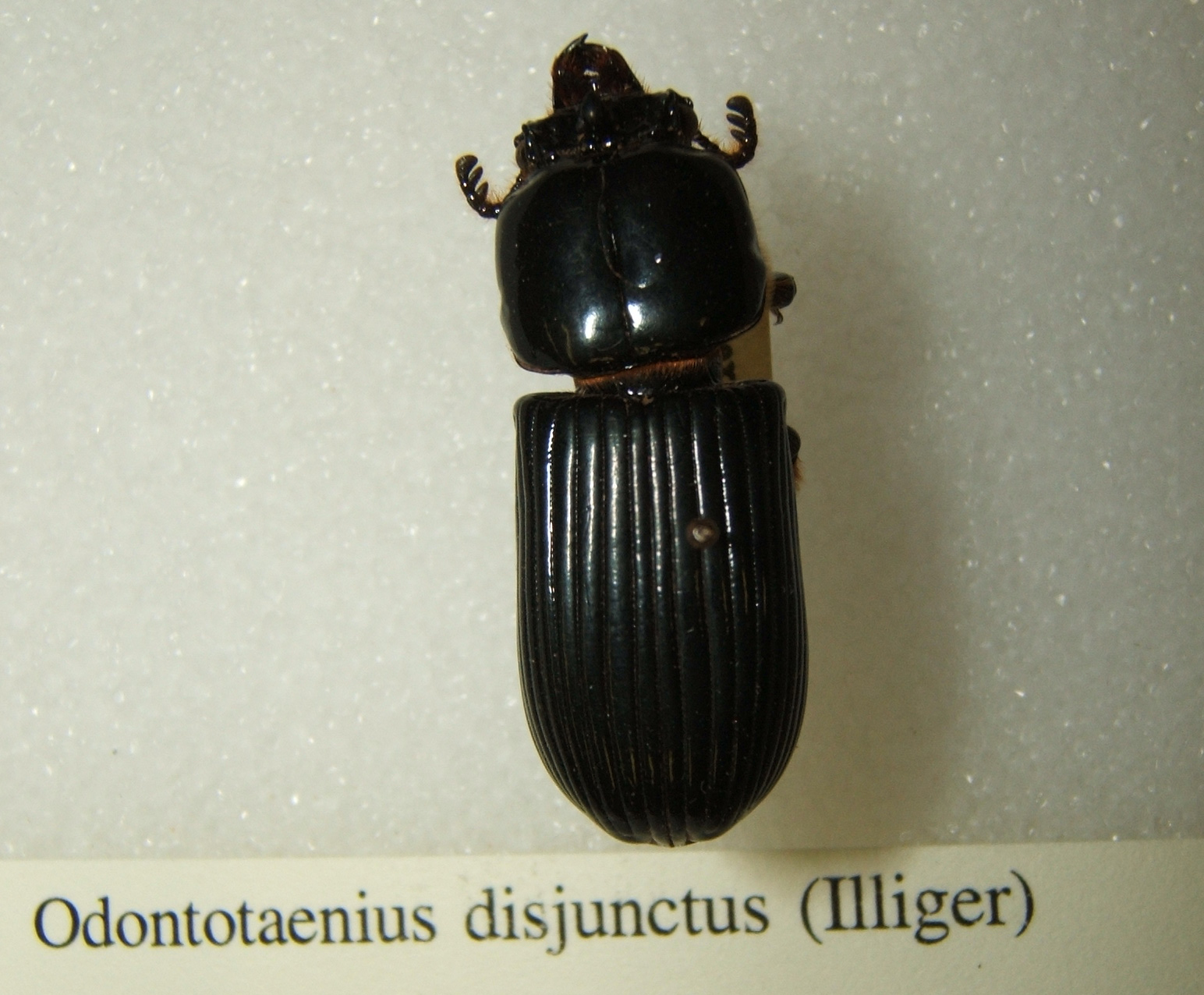
Adult O. disjunctus

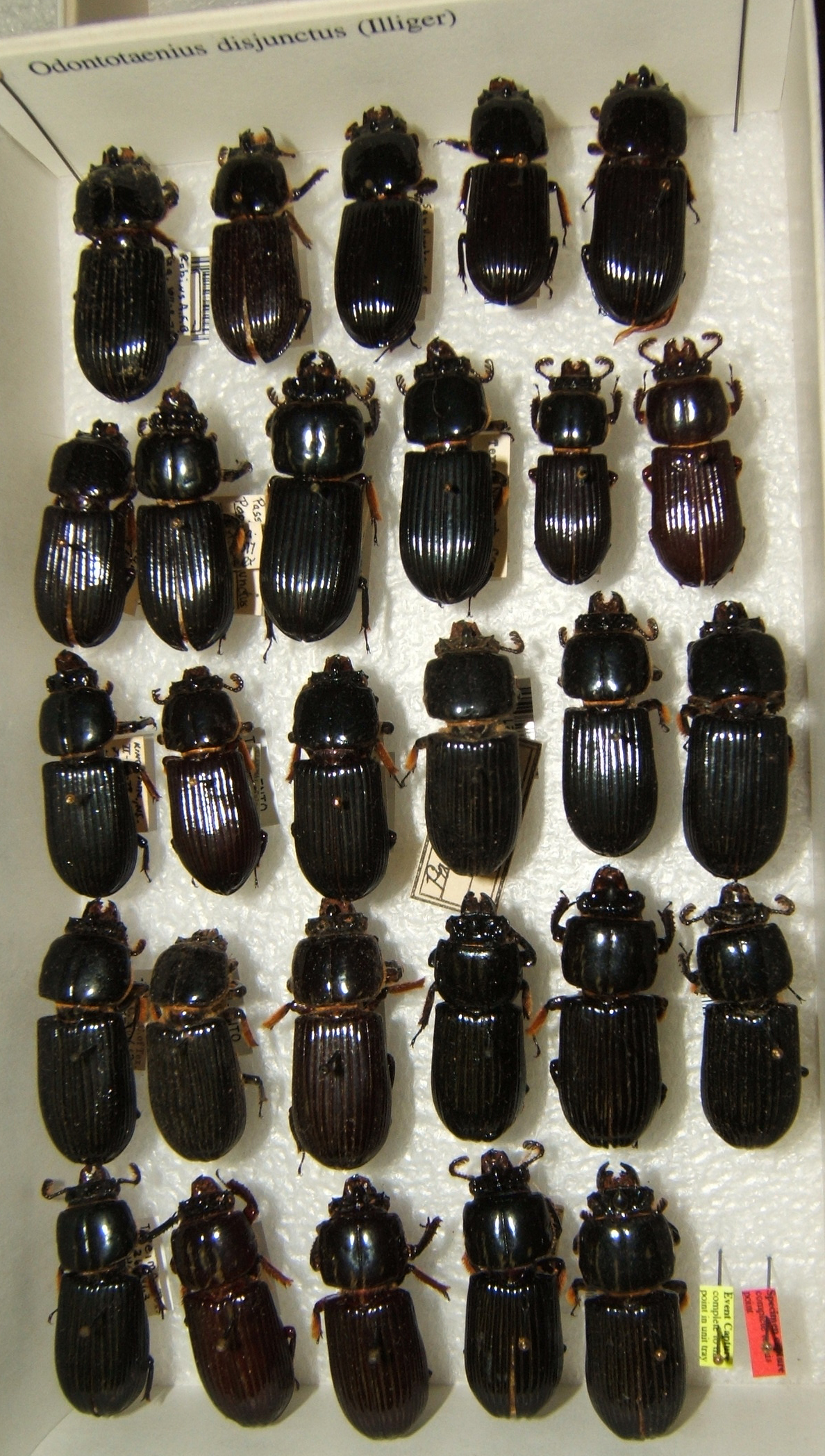
Adult O. disjunctus variation

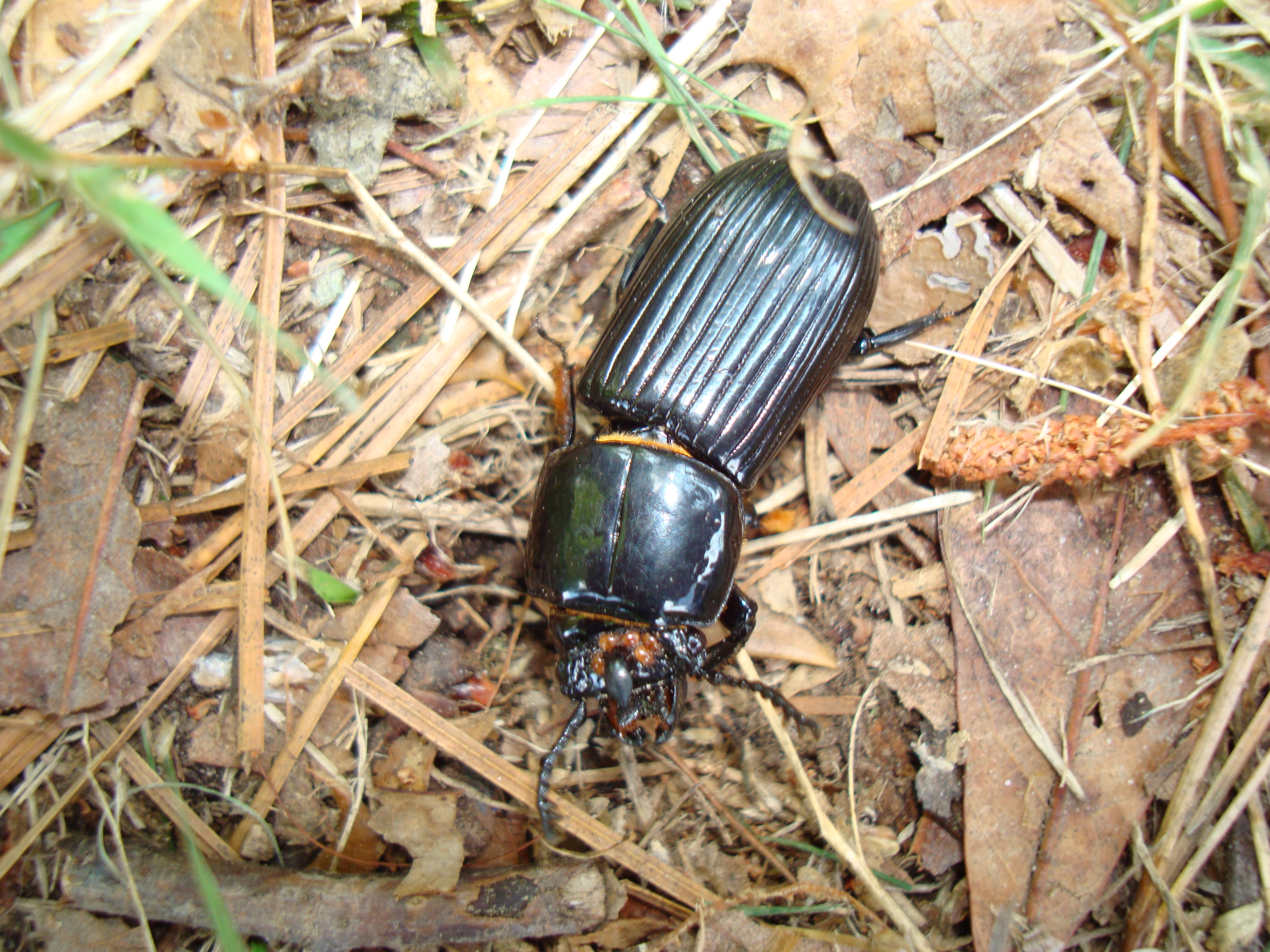
O. disjunctus beetle in woods near Franklin, Virginia
