= C. darwini =

C. darwini may refer to:

- Caerostris darwini, Darwin's bark spider
- Calosima darwini, Adamski & Landry, 1997, a moth species
- Canthidium darwini
- Carios darwini
- Cavernulina darwini
- Centrodora darwini
- Ceratina darwini
- Chelonoidis darwini a species of Galápagos tortoise
- Chionelasmus darwini
- Cleonus darwini
- Cryptocercus darwini, a cockroach species in the genus Cryptocercus

== See also ==
- C. darwinii (disambiguation)
- Darwini (disambiguation)
