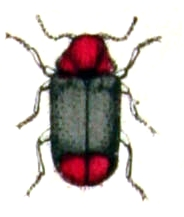
- Ochina latrellii

Scientific classification
- Kingdom: Animalia
- Phylum: Arthropoda
- Class: Insecta
- Order: Coleoptera
- Suborder: Polyphaga
- Family: Ptinidae
- Subfamily: Ernobiinae
- Genus: Ochina
- Species: O. latrellii

Binomial name
- Ochina latrellii (Bonelli, 1812)

Synonyms
- Ptilinus latrellii Bonelli, 1812

= Ochina latrellii =

Species of beetle

Ochina latrellii is a species of beetle native to Europe and the Near East. In Europe, it has been recorded in Austria, Belgium, Croatia, the Czech Republic, mainland France, Germany, mainland Greece, Hungary, mainland Italy, Romania, Sardinia, Slovakia, mainland Spain, Switzerland, Ukraine and Yugoslavia.
