= Cryptocercus matilei =

Scientific classification
- Kingdom: Animalia
- Phylum: Arthropoda
- Clade: Pancrustacea
- Class: Insecta
- Order: Blattodea
- Family: Cryptocercidae
- Genus: Cryptocercus
- Species: C. matilei

Binomial name
- Cryptocercus matilei Grandcolas, 2000

Species of cockroach

Cryptocercus matilei is a species of subsocial, xylophagous cockroach in the family Cryptocercidae. It is found in the Sichuan province of West China.
