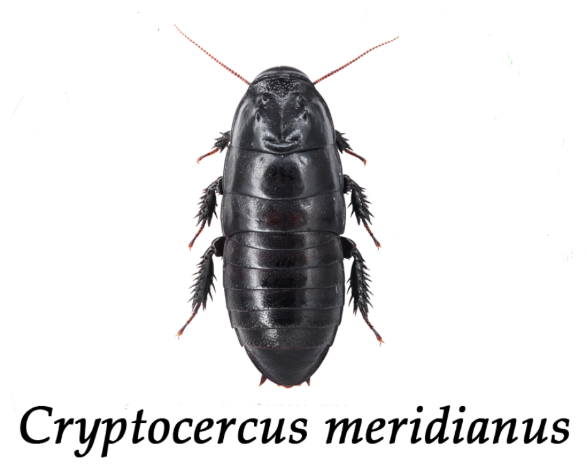

Scientific classification
- Kingdom: Animalia
- Phylum: Arthropoda
- Clade: Pancrustacea
- Class: Insecta
- Order: Blattodea
- Family: Cryptocercidae
- Genus: Cryptocercus
- Species: C. meridianus

Binomial name
- Cryptocercus meridianus Grandcolas & Legendre, 2005

= Cryptocercus meridianus =

Species of cockroach

Cryptocercus meridianus is a species of subsocial, xylophagous cockroach in the family Cryptocercidae. It is found in Lijang in the Yunnan province of China, and named for its southern locality.
