= C. darwinii =

C. darwinii may refer to:

- Caberea darwinii
- Calceolaria darwinii, a perennial plant originally from Tierra del Fuego in the southern part of South America
- Camponotus darwinii, Forel, 1886, a carpenter ant species in the genus Camponotus
- Carex darwinii
- Cladonia darwinii
- Cosmocalanus darwinii
- Cyttaria darwinii, the type species of Cyttaria, a genus of ascomycete fungi

== See also ==
- C. darwini (disambiguation)
- Darwinii (disambiguation)
