= Cryptocercus parvus =

Scientific classification
- Kingdom: Animalia
- Phylum: Arthropoda
- Clade: Pancrustacea
- Class: Insecta
- Order: Blattodea
- Family: Cryptocercidae
- Genus: Cryptocercus
- Species: C. parvus

Binomial name
- Cryptocercus parvus Grandcolas & Park, 2005

Species of cockroach

Cryptocercus parvus is a species of subsocial, xylophagous cockroach in the family Cryptocercidae. It is found in Mudanjiang in the Heilongjiang province of China. It is named for its small size relative to others in the genus.
