= Ozognathus cornutus =

Scientific classification
- Kingdom: Animalia
- Phylum: Arthropoda
- Clade: Pancrustacea
- Class: Insecta
- Order: Coleoptera
- Suborder: Polyphaga
- Family: Ptinidae
- Genus: Ozognathus
- Species: O. cornutus

Binomial name
- Ozognathus cornutus (LeConte, 1859)

Synonyms
- Ozognathus misellus LeConte, 1865

Species of beetle

Ozognathus cornutus is a species of beetle in the family Ptinidae. It is native to North America but has spread elsewhere, including Europe, North Africa, New Zealand, and South America. This beetle is saproxylophagous, meaning that it feeds on dead wood, including galls and the feces of other wood-eating insects. They are also known to feed on dried fruits and vegetables. Adult Ozognathus cornutus are dark brown or black and 1.5-2.8 mm in length. They lay their eggs in galls induced by other species of insects.
