= Cryptocercus primarius =

Scientific classification
- Kingdom: Animalia
- Phylum: Arthropoda
- Clade: Pancrustacea
- Class: Insecta
- Order: Blattodea
- Family: Cryptocercidae
- Genus: Cryptocercus
- Species: C. primarius

Binomial name
- Cryptocercus primarius Bey-Bienko, 1938

Species of cockroach

Cryptocercus primarius is a species of subsocial, xylophagous cockroach in the family Cryptocercidae. It is found in the Sichuan Province of China, and is thought to be the most ancestral member of Cryptocercus.
