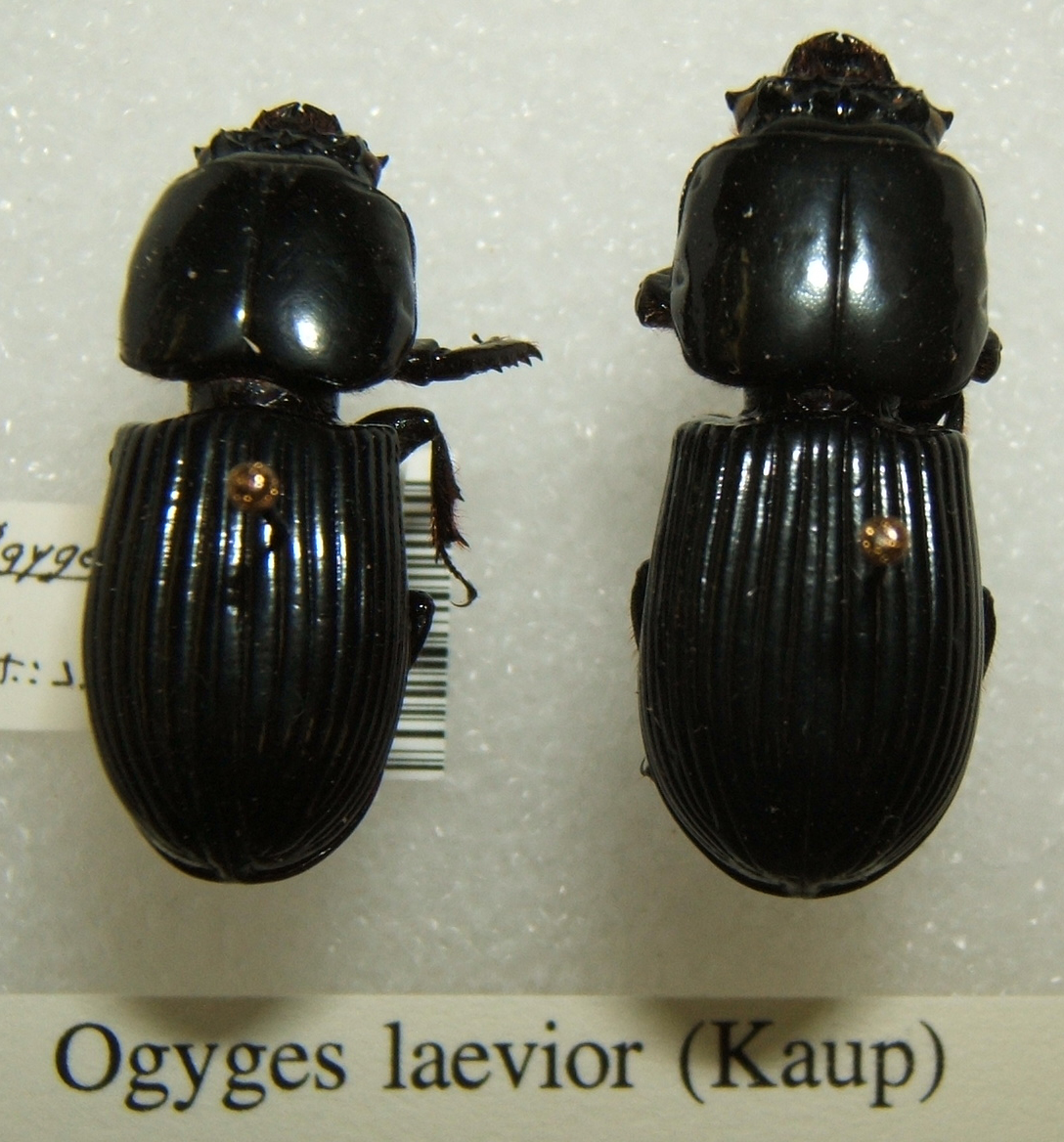
- Ogyges championi

Scientific classification
- Kingdom: Animalia
- Phylum: Arthropoda
- Clade: Pancrustacea
- Class: Insecta
- Order: Coleoptera
- Suborder: Polyphaga
- Infraorder: Scarabaeiformia
- Family: Passalidae
- Genus: Ogyges; Kaup, 1871

Synonyms
- Proculejoides Kuwert, 1896; Oxyges Wytsman, 1884

= Ogyges (beetle) =

Genus of beetles

Ogyges is a genus of beetles in the family Passalidae. The genus is distributed in Meso-America, from Mexico to Nicaragua.

Ogyges are flightless and saproxylophagous.

== Species ==
There are 25 recognized species:

- Ogyges adamsi Schuster & Reyes-Castillo, 1990
- Ogyges aluxi Schuster, Cano & Boucher, 2005
- Ogyges cakchiqueli Schuster & Reyes-Castillo, 1990
- Ogyges cavei Cano, 2014
- Ogyges championi (Bates, 1886)
- Ogyges coxchicopi Schuster, Cano & Boucher, 2005
- Ogyges crassulus (Casey, 1897)
- Ogyges furcillatus Schuster & Reyes-Castillo, 1990
- Ogyges handali Cano, 2014
- Ogyges hondurensis Schuster & Reyes-Castillo, 1990
- Ogyges kekchii Schuster & Reyes-Castillo, 1990
- Ogyges laevissimus (Kaup, 1868)
- Ogyges laurae Cano, 2014
- Ogyges llama Cano, 2014
- Ogyges marilucasae Reyes-Castillo & Castillo, 1986
- Ogyges menchuae Cano, 2014
- Ogyges monzoni Schuster, Cano & Boucher, 2005
- Ogyges mutenroshii Cano, 2014
- Ogyges nahuali Schuster, Cano & Boucher, 2005
- Ogyges politus (Hincks, 1953)
- Ogyges quichensis Schuster & Reyes-Castillo, 1990
- Ogyges ratcliffei Cano, 2014
- Ogyges sandinoi Cano, 2014
- Ogyges toriyamai Cano, 2014
- Ogyges tzutuhili Schuster & Reyes-Castillo, 1990
