= Cryptocercus kyebangensis =

Korean wood-feeding cockroach

Scientific classification
- Kingdom: Animalia
- Phylum: Arthropoda
- Clade: Pancrustacea
- Class: Insecta
- Order: Blattodea
- Family: Cryptocercidae
- Genus: Cryptocercus
- Species: C. kyebangensis

Binomial name
- Cryptocercus kyebangensis Grandcolas et al, 2001

Species of cockroach

Cryptocercus kyebangensis, the Korean wood-feeding cockroach, is a species of subsocial, xylophagous cockroach in the family Cryptocercidae. It is found in South Korea.

== Habitat ==
C. kyebangensis is a xylophagous cockroach distributed within temperate forested mountains in South Korea, predominantly between 720 and 1,915 m (2,360 and 6,280 ft) above sea level. They excavate complex galleries in rotten logs wherein parents care for nymphs as monogamous groups. Older nymphs with stronger mandibles tunnel as well, which leads to more complex galleries in groups with nymphs.

== Reproduction and life cycle ==
Five age stages have been observed in C. kyebangensis colonies, and nymphs appear to reach adulthood five years after birth. Females typically have only a single reproduction in their lifetime.

Nymphs hatch without the gut fauna necessary to digest wood, and have to obtain it via proctodeal trophallaxis from adults in the first stage.
