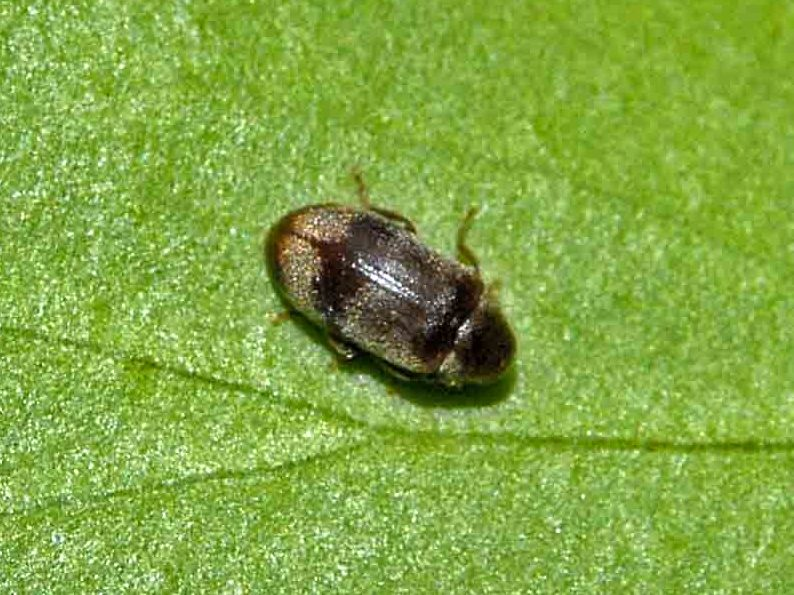

Scientific classification
- Kingdom: Animalia
- Phylum: Arthropoda
- Class: Insecta
- Order: Coleoptera
- Suborder: Polyphaga
- Family: Ptinidae
- Genus: Ochina
- Species: O. ptinoides

Binomial name
- Ochina ptinoides (Marsham, 1802)

= Ochina ptinoides =

Species of beetle

Ochina ptinoides is a species of beetle in the genus Ochina of the family Ptinidae.

== Description ==
Ochina ptinoides can reach a length of about 2.5–3.5 millimetres (0.098–0.138 in). Elytra are dark brown. Pubescence forms transversal bands before middle and apex. Also head is dark brown. Antennae are serrate and composed by eleven segments. This species is associated with Ivy (hence the common name) and the larvae bore into the stems. Adults can be found from early May until August.

== Distribution ==
This species can be found in most of Europe, in the Near East and in North Africa.
