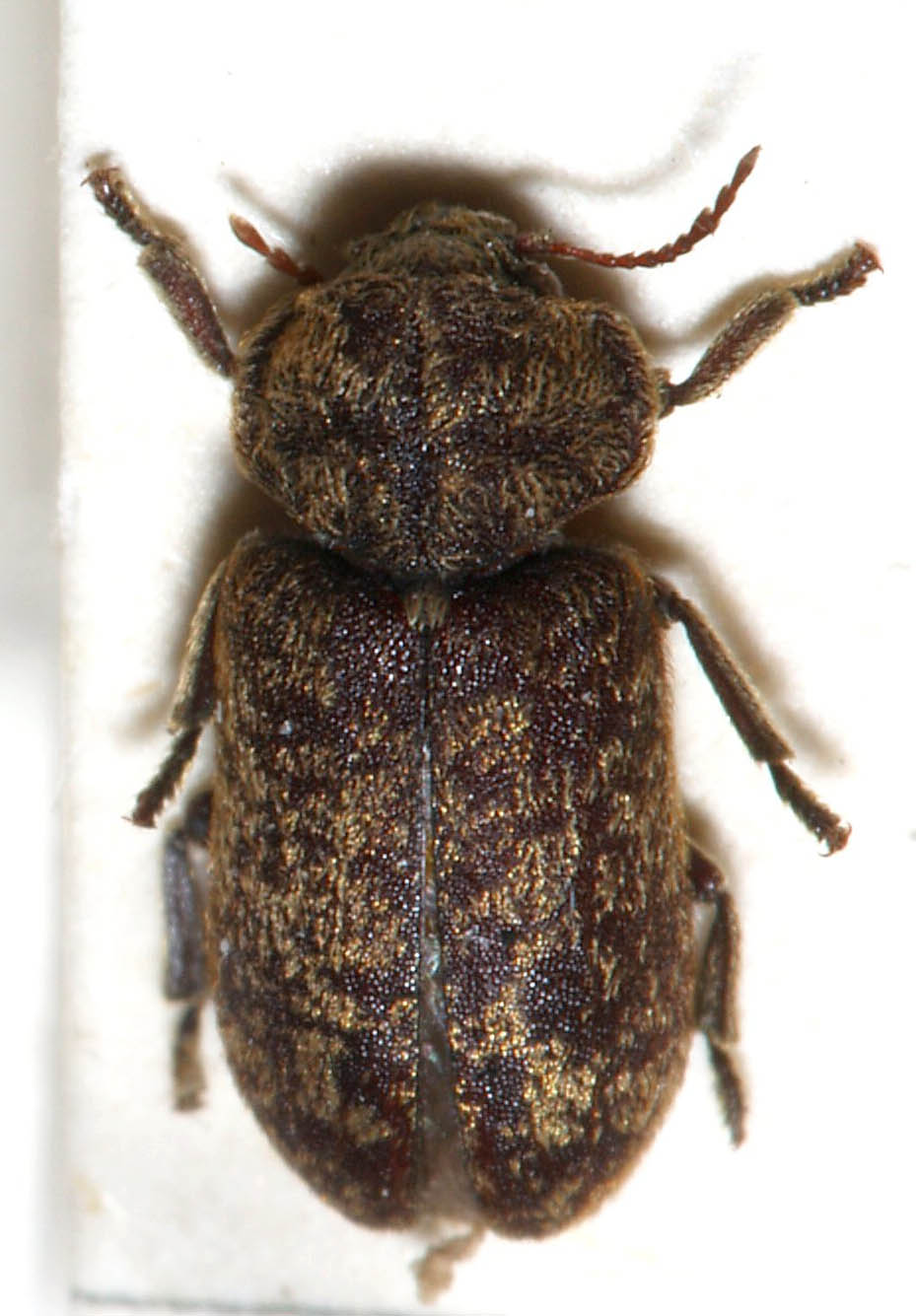
- Xestobium rufovillosum

Scientific classification
- Kingdom: Animalia
- Phylum: Arthropoda
- Class: Insecta
- Order: Coleoptera
- Suborder: Polyphaga
- Superfamily: Bostrichoidea
- Family: Ptinidae
- Subfamily: Ernobiinae
- Tribe: Xestobiini
- Genus: Xestobium; Motschulsky, 1845

= Xestobium =

Genus of beetles

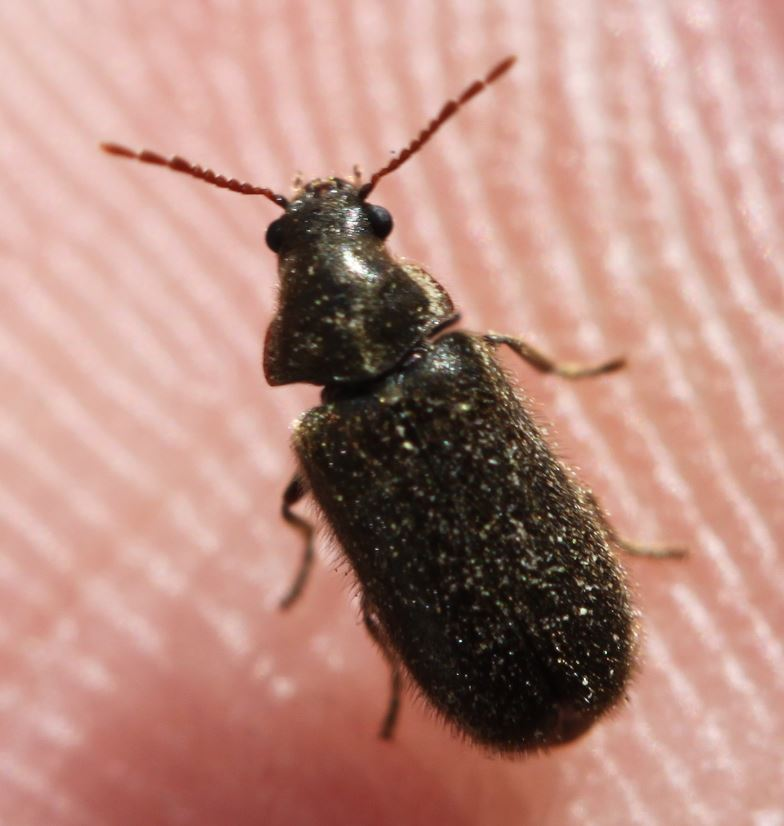
Xestobium plumbeum

Xestobium is a genus of death-watch and spider beetles in the family Ptinidae. There are about 13 described species in Xestobium.

== Species ==
These 14 species belong to the genus Xestobium:

- Xestobium abietis Fisher, 1947^{i c g}
- Xestobium affine LeConte, 1874^{i c g b}
- Xestobium africanum Español, 1964^{g}
- Xestobium austriacum Reitter, 1890^{g}
- Xestobium caucasicum Logvinovskiy, 1977^{g}
- Xestobium declive
- Xestobium filicorne Israelson, 1974^{g}
- Xestobium gaspensis White, 1975^{i c g}
- Xestobium impressum (Wollaston, 1865)^{g}
- Xestobium marginicolle (LeConte, 1859)^{i c g}
- Xestobium parvum White, 1976^{i c g}
- Xestobium plumbeum (Illiger, 1801)^{g}
- Xestobium rufovillosum (De Geer, 1774)^{i c g b} (deathwatch beetle)
- Xestobium subincanum Reitter, 1878^{g}

Data sources: i = ITIS, c = Catalogue of Life, g = GBIF, b = Bugguide.net

== Gallery ==
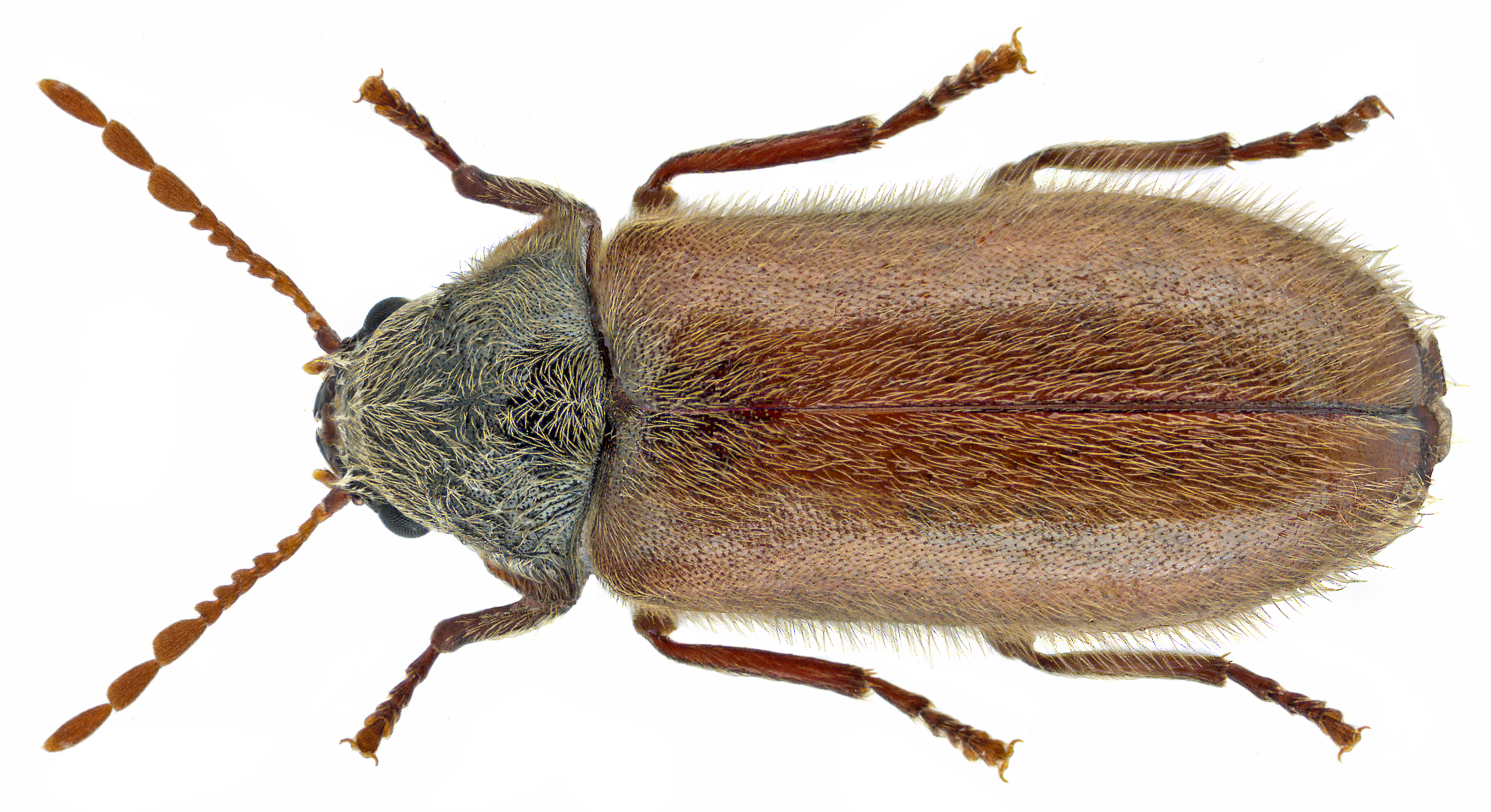
Xestobium plumbeum

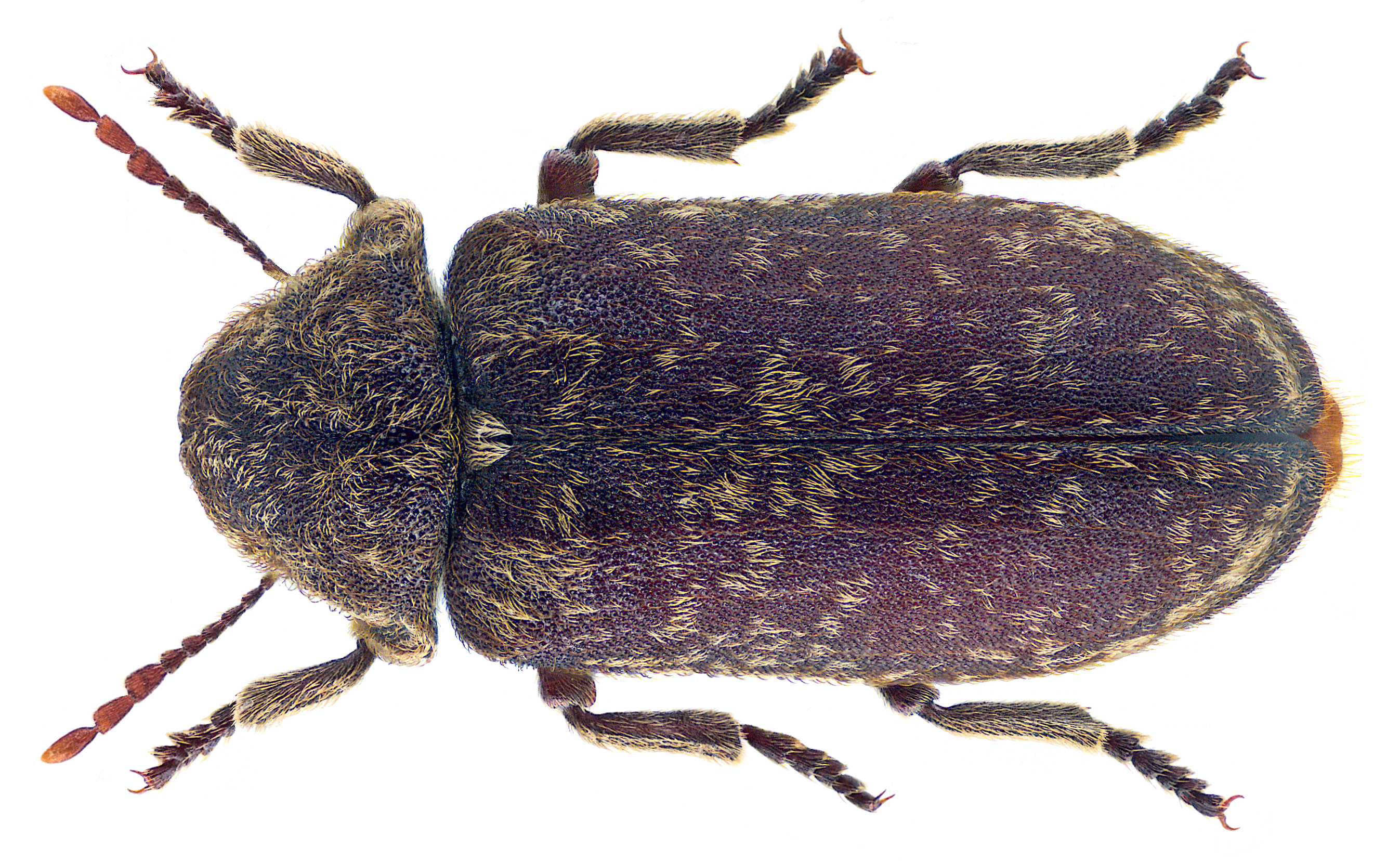
Xestobium rufovillosum
