= Cryptocercus hirtus =

Scientific classification
- Kingdom: Animalia
- Phylum: Arthropoda
- Clade: Pancrustacea
- Class: Insecta
- Order: Blattodea
- Family: Cryptocercidae
- Genus: Cryptocercus
- Species: C. hirtus

Binomial name
- Cryptocercus hirtus Grandcolas & Bellés, 2005

Species of cockroach

Cryptocercus hirtus is a species of cockroach in the family Cryptocercidae. It is found in the Gansu province of China. They are named for their ornamented pronotum.
