= Utobium marmoratum =

Scientific classification
- Kingdom: Animalia
- Phylum: Arthropoda
- Clade: Pancrustacea
- Class: Insecta
- Order: Coleoptera
- Suborder: Polyphaga
- Family: Ptinidae
- Tribe: Xestobiini
- Genus: Utobium
- Species: U. marmoratum

Binomial name
- Utobium marmoratum Fisher, 1939

Species of beetle

Utobium marmoratum is a species of beetle in the family Ptinidae. It is found in North America.
