= Utobium =

Scientific classification
- Kingdom: Animalia
- Phylum: Arthropoda
- Clade: Pancrustacea
- Class: Insecta
- Order: Coleoptera
- Suborder: Polyphaga
- Family: Ptinidae
- Subfamily: Ernobiinae
- Tribe: Xestobiini
- Genus: Utobium; Fall, 1905

Genus of beetles

Utobium is a genus of death-watch and spider beetles in the family Ptinidae. There are at least four described species in Utobium.

== Species ==
These four species belong to the genus Utobium:

- Utobium elegans (Horn, 1894)
- Utobium granulatum White, 1976
- Utobium griseum White, 1966
- Utobium marmoratum Fisher, 1939
