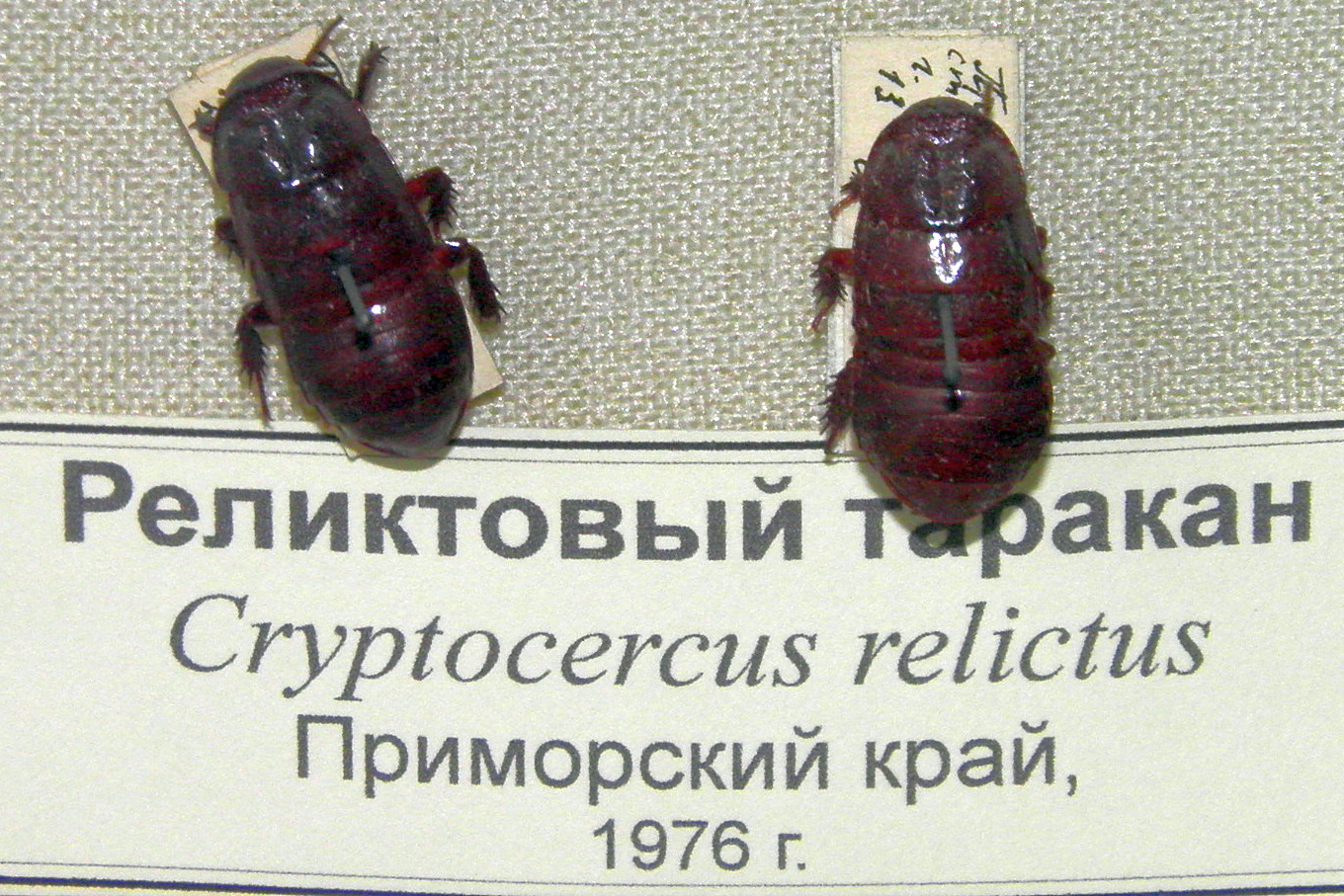

Scientific classification
- Kingdom: Animalia
- Phylum: Arthropoda
- Clade: Pancrustacea
- Class: Insecta
- Order: Blattodea
- Family: Cryptocercidae
- Genus: Cryptocercus
- Species: C. relictus

Binomial name
- Cryptocercus relictus Bey-Bienko, 1935

= Cryptocercus relictus =

Species of cockroach

Cryptocercus relictus is a subsocial, xylophagous species of cockroach in the family Cryptocercidae. It is found throughout the Ussuri region and Siberia in Russia, the provinces of Heilongjiang and Jilin in China, and South Korea.
