= Xestobium affine =

Scientific classification
- Kingdom: Animalia
- Phylum: Arthropoda
- Clade: Pancrustacea
- Class: Insecta
- Order: Coleoptera
- Suborder: Polyphaga
- Family: Ptinidae
- Genus: Xestobium
- Species: X. affine

Binomial name
- Xestobium affine LeConte, 1874

Species of beetle

Xestobium affine is a species of beetle in the family Ptinidae. It is found in North America.
