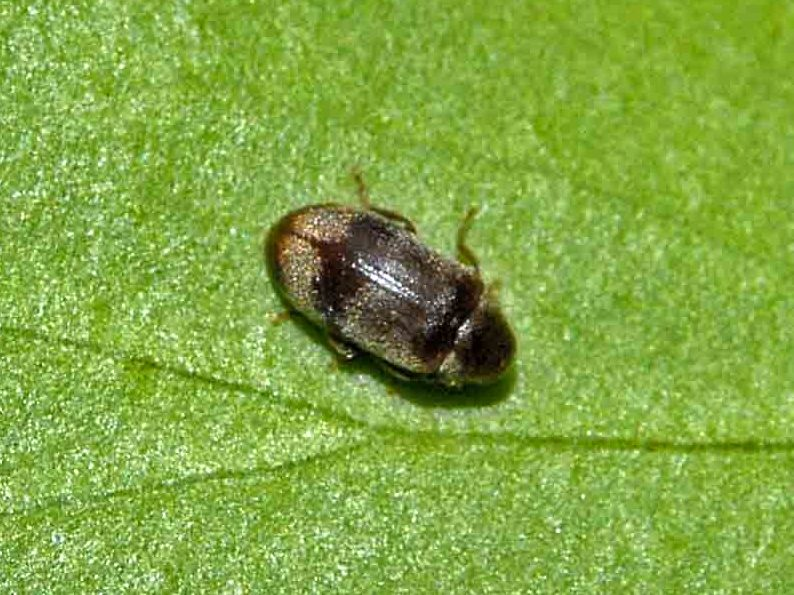
- Ochina ptinoides

Scientific classification
- Kingdom: Animalia
- Phylum: Arthropoda
- Class: Insecta
- Order: Coleoptera
- Suborder: Polyphaga
- Family: Ptinidae
- Subfamily: Ernobiinae
- Genus: Ochina; Dejean, 1821

= Ochina =

Ivy-boring beetle

Genus of beetles

Ochina, commonly known as the ivy-boring beetles, is a genus of beetle of the family Ptinidae.

== Subgenus and species ==
- Ochina (Cittobium)
  - Ochina ferruginea
  - Ochina hirsuta
  - Ochina leveillei
  - Ochina ptinoides
- Ochina (Ochina)
  - Ochina latrellii

== Distribution ==
Species of this genus are native to Europe, the Near East, and North Africa.
