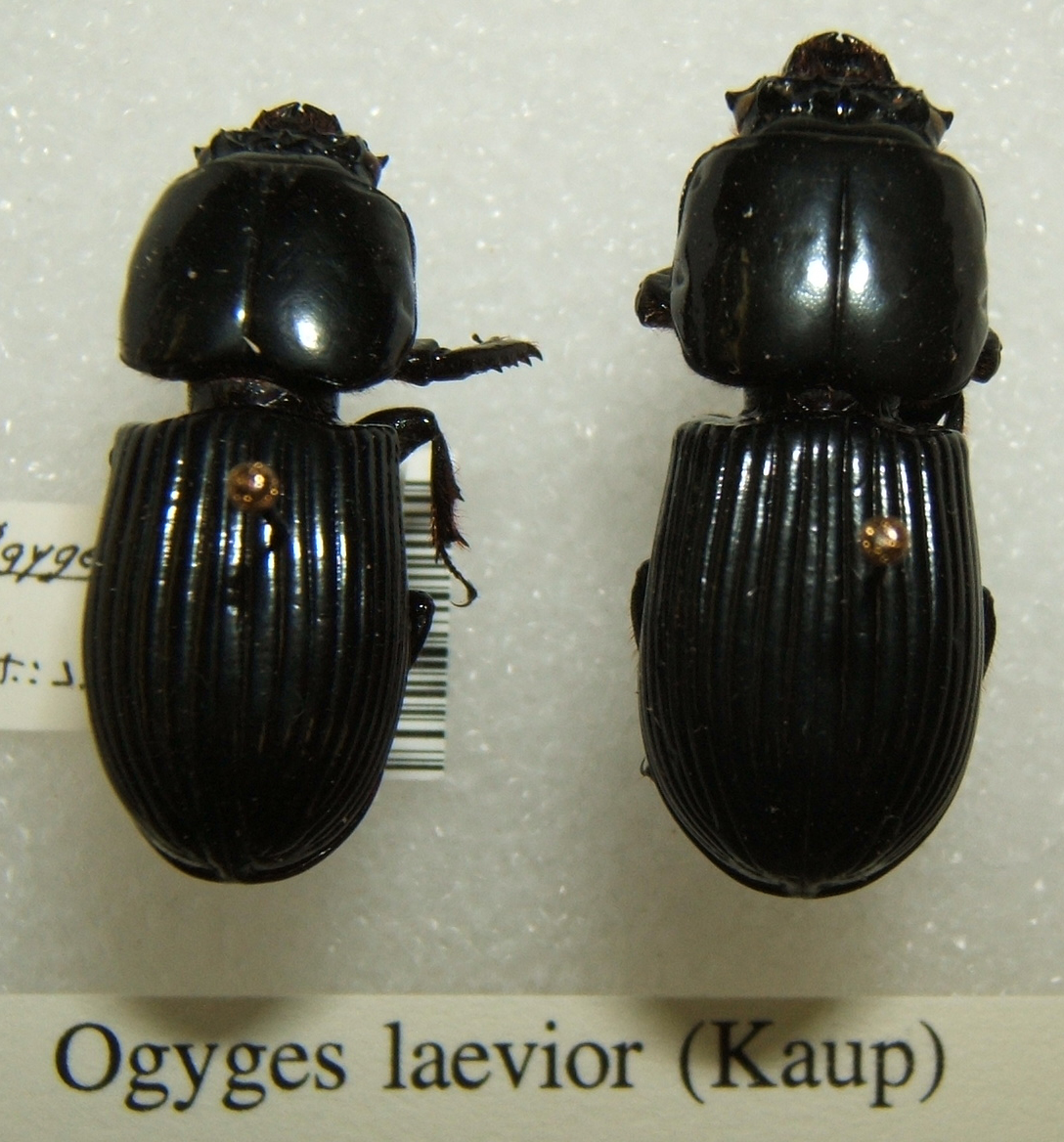
- Ogyges championi, adult

Scientific classification
- Kingdom: Animalia
- Phylum: Arthropoda
- Clade: Pancrustacea
- Class: Insecta
- Order: Coleoptera
- Suborder: Polyphaga
- Infraorder: Scarabaeiformia
- Family: Passalidae
- Genus: Ogyges
- Species: O. championi

Binomial name
- Ogyges championi (Bates, 1886)

Synonyms
- Proculejus championi Bates, 1886; Ogyges laevior vinculotaenia Kuwert, 1897

= Ogyges championi =

Species of beetle

Ogyges championi is a beetle of the family Passalidae. It occurs in El Salvador, Guatemala, and southern Mexico (Chiapas). It occurs are altitudes of 1,350–2,400 m (4,430–7,870 ft).
