= Ozognathus floridanus =

Scientific classification
- Kingdom: Animalia
- Phylum: Arthropoda
- Clade: Pancrustacea
- Class: Insecta
- Order: Coleoptera
- Suborder: Polyphaga
- Family: Ptinidae
- Genus: Ozognathus
- Species: O. floridanus

Binomial name
- Ozognathus floridanus LeConte, 1878

Species of beetle

Ozognathus floridanus is a species of beetle in the family Ptinidae. It is found in North America.
