= Ozognathus =

Scientific classification
- Kingdom: Animalia
- Phylum: Arthropoda
- Clade: Pancrustacea
- Class: Insecta
- Order: Coleoptera
- Suborder: Polyphaga
- Family: Ptinidae
- Subfamily: Ernobiinae
- Tribe: Ozognathini
- Genus: Ozognathus; LeConte, 1861

Synonyms
- Durangoum Pic, 1903; Micranobium Gorham, 1883

Genus of beetles

Ozognathus is a genus of death-watch and spider beetles in the family Ptinidae. They are native to the Americas.

== Species ==
There are 11 recognized species of Ozognathus.

Selected species:

- Ozognathus cornutus (LeConte, 1859)
- Ozognathus dubius Fall, 1905
- Ozognathus floridanus LeConte, 1878
