= Salganea =

Scientific classification
- Kingdom: Animalia
- Phylum: Arthropoda
- Clade: Pancrustacea
- Class: Insecta
- Order: Blattodea
- Family: Blaberidae
- Subfamily: Panesthiinae
- Genus: Salganea; Stål, 1877

Synonyms
- Mylacrina Kirby, 1903

Genus of cockroaches

External image
- Images at iNaturalist

Salganea is a genus of South East Asian cockroaches in the subfamily Panesthiinae, erected by Carl Stål in 1877.

== Species ==
The Cockroach Species File lists:

1. Salganea cavagnaroi Roth, 1979
2. Salganea erythronota Bolívar, 1897
3. Salganea evansi Roth, 1979
4. Salganea guangxiensis (Feng & Woo, 1990)
5. Salganea hebardi Roth, 1979
6. Salganea inaequaliterspinosa Hanitsch, 1933
7. Salganea kodaikanalensis Roth, 1979
8. Salganea matsumotoi Maekawa, Kon & Araya, 2005
9. Salganea nalepae Maekawa & Matsumoto, 1999
10. Salganea obtusespinosa Princis, 1954
11. Salganea rehni Roth, 1979
12. Salganea rossi Roth, 1979
13. Salganea taylori Roth, 1979
14. Salganea wrayi (Kirby, 1903)

In addition, a large number of species have been placed in 5 superspecies based on:

Salganea supersp. foveolata Roth, 1979 (Sulawesi)

- Salganea foveolata Saussure, 1895

Salganea supersp. morio Roth, 1979 (Malesia)

- Salganea morio (Burmeister, 1838) - type species (as Panesthia morio Burmeister)

Salganea supersp. nigrita Roth, 1979 (widespread in India, China, SE Asia)

1. Salganea amboinica Brunner von Wattenwyl, 1893
2. Salganea anisodanta Wang, Shi, Wang & Che, 2014
3. Salganea biglumis (Saussure, 1895)
4. Salganea doesburgi Roth, 1979
5. Salganea esakii Roth, 1979
6. Salganea gressitti Roth, 1979
7. Salganea humeralis Caudell, 1906
8. Salganea incerta (Brunner von Wattenwyl, 1893)
9. Salganea indica Princis, 1953
10. Salganea nigrita (Stoll, 1813)
11. Salganea passaloides (Walker, 1868)
12. Salganea quinquedentata Wang, Shi, Wang & Che, 2014
13. Salganea rugulata Saussure, 1895
14. Salganea taiwanensis Roth, 1979
15. Salganea ternatensis Brunner von Wattenwyl, 1893
16. Salganea triangulifera Hanitsch, 1933

Salganea supersp. papua Roth, 1979 (New Guinea)

- Salganea papua Shelford, 1908

Salganea supersp. raggei Roth, 1979

- Salganea raggei Roth, 1979
