= Microzogus =

Scientific classification
- Kingdom: Animalia
- Phylum: Arthropoda
- Clade: Pancrustacea
- Class: Insecta
- Order: Coleoptera
- Suborder: Polyphaga
- Family: Ptinidae
- Subfamily: Ernobiinae
- Tribe: Ozognathini
- Genus: Microzogus; Fall, 1905

Synonyms
- Scymnuseutheca Pic, 1909

Genus of beetles

Microzogus is a genus of death-watch and spider beetles in the family Ptinidae. There are at least two described species in Microzogus.

== Species ==
These two species belong to the genus Microzogus:

- Microzogus insolens Fall, 1905
- Scymnuseutheca apicalis Pic, 1909
