= Ochina hirsuta =

Scientific classification
- Kingdom: Animalia
- Phylum: Arthropoda
- Class: Insecta
- Order: Coleoptera
- Suborder: Polyphaga
- Family: Ptinidae
- Genus: Ochina
- Species: O. hirsuta

Binomial name
- Ochina hirsuta Seidlitz, 1889

Species of beetle

Ochina hirsuta is a species of ivy-boring beetle in the Ptinidae family.
