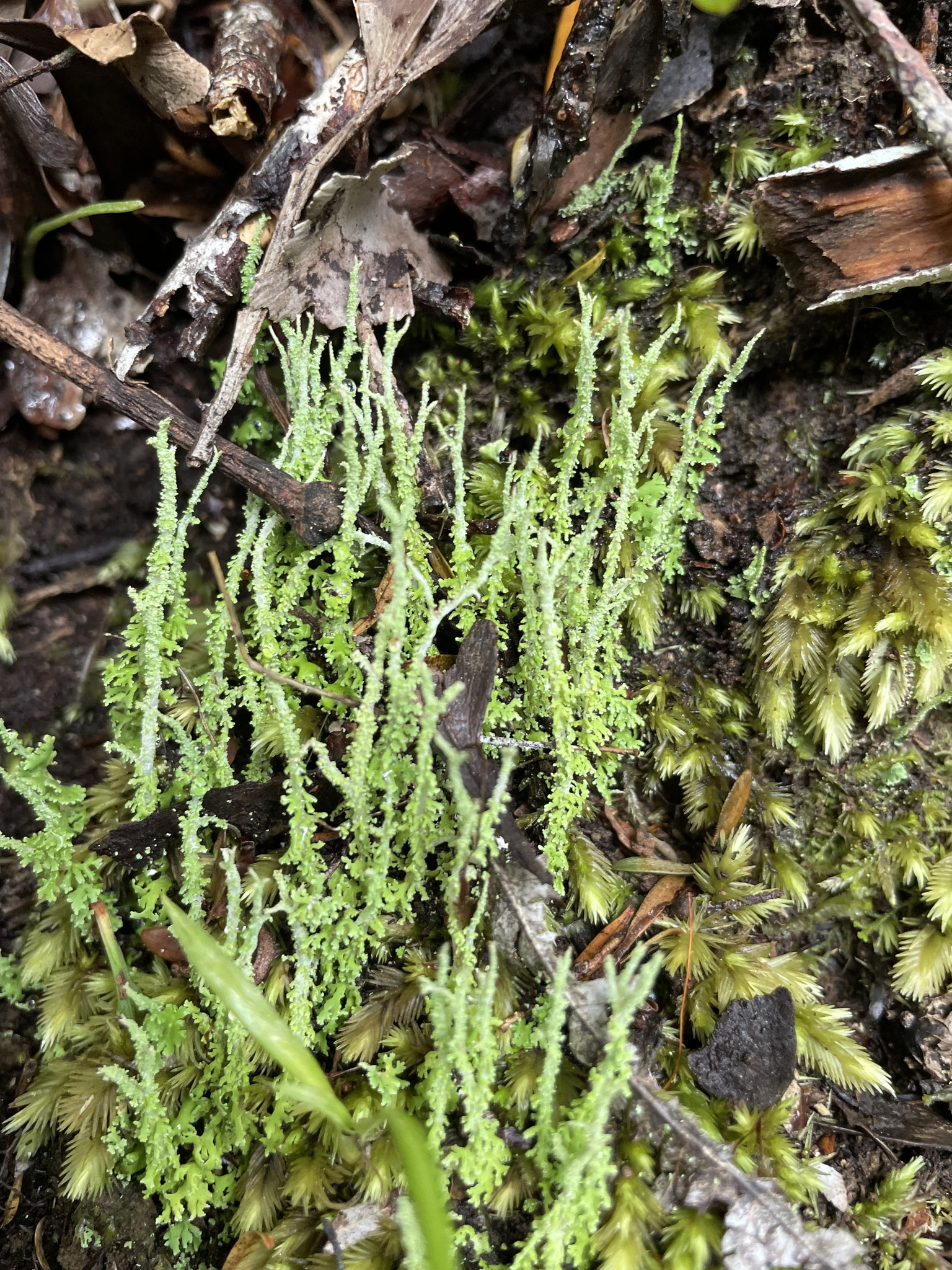

Scientific classification
- Kingdom: Fungi
- Division: Ascomycota
- Class: Lecanoromycetes
- Order: Lecanorales
- Family: Cladoniaceae
- Genus: Cladonia
- Species: C. darwinii

Binomial name
- Cladonia darwinii S.Hammer (2003)
- Holotype: Mavora Lakes area, New Zealand

= Cladonia darwinii =

Species of lichen

Cladonia darwinii is a species of fruticose lichen in the family Cladoniaceae. Found in Australia and New Zealand, it was formally described as a new species in 2003 by the lichenologist Samuel Hammer. He collected the type specimen from the vicinity of the Mavora Lakes in Southland, at an elevation of 620 m (2,030 ft). The species epithet is named after Charles Darwin to honour his foundational work on evolutionary theory and the significance of variation in evolution, a concept that remains challenging in the study of Cladonia lichens.

The primary thallus of Cladonia darwinii is squamulose, either persistent or evanescent, esorediate, granular, and lobed. The podetia are hairy, cylindrical, subulate, and can be granular or squamulose. They contain fumarprotocetraric acid.

== See also ==
- List of Cladonia species
