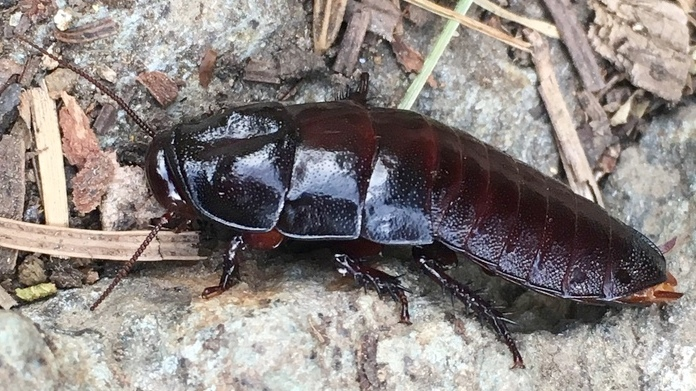

Scientific classification
- Domain: Eukaryota
- Kingdom: Animalia
- Phylum: Arthropoda
- Class: Insecta
- Order: Blattodea
- Family: Cryptocercidae
- Genus: Cryptocercus
- Species: C. clevelandi

Binomial name
- Cryptocercus clevelandi Byers, 1997

= Cryptocercus clevelandi =

Species of cockroach

Cryptocercus clevelandi is a species of cockroach in the family Cryptocercidae. It is found in North America.
