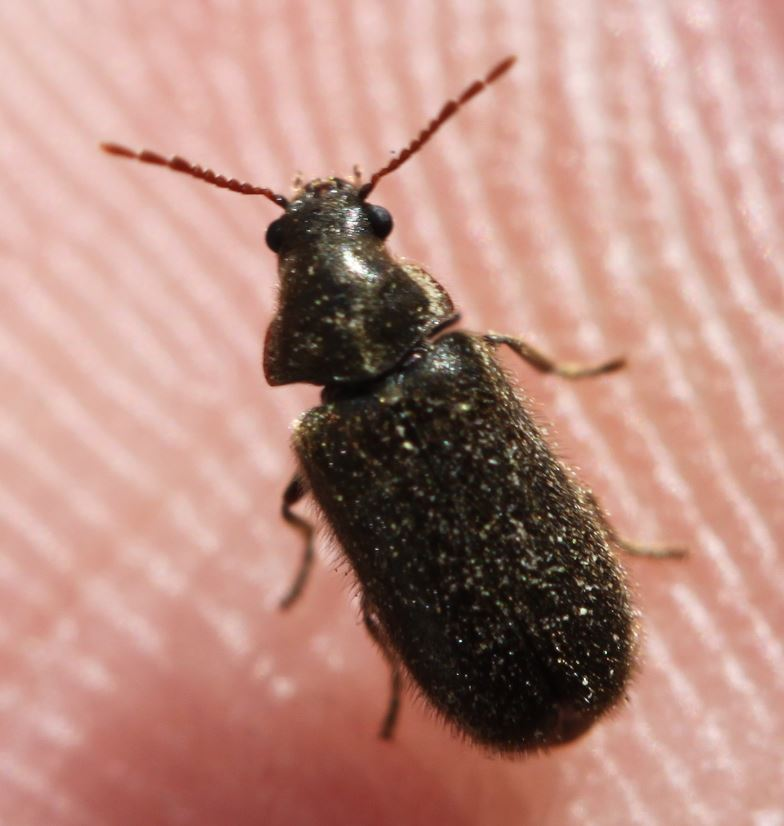
- Xestobium plumbeum

Scientific classification
- Kingdom: Animalia
- Phylum: Arthropoda
- Class: Insecta
- Order: Coleoptera
- Suborder: Polyphaga
- Family: Ptinidae
- Subfamily: Ernobiinae; Pic, 1912

Synonyms
- Cerocosminae Pic, 1912

= Ernobiinae =

Subfamily of beetles

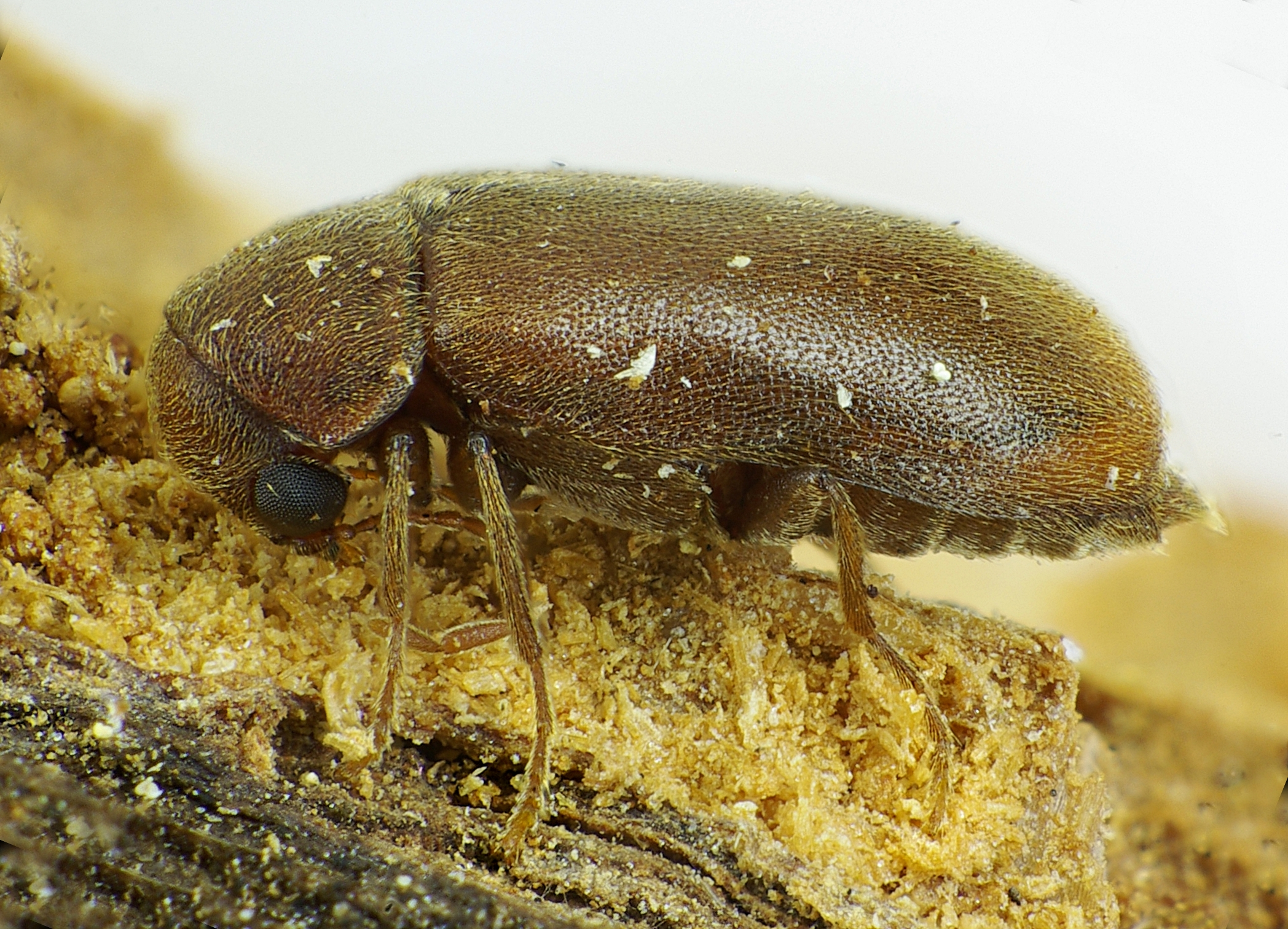
Ernobius mollis

Ernobiinae is a subfamily of death-watch and spider beetles in the family Ptinidae. There are about 8 genera and at least 90 described species in Ernobiinae.

The subfamily Dryophilinae, along with Anobiinae and several others, were formerly considered members of the family Anobiidae, but the family name has since been changed to Ptinidae.

== Genera ==
These 8 genera belong to the subfamily Ernobiinae:

- Episernus Thomson, 1863^{i c b}
- Ernobius Thomson, 1859^{i c b}
- Microzogus Fall, 1905^{i c b}
- Ozognathus LeConte, 1861^{i c b}
- Paralobium Fall, 1905-01^{i c}
- Utobium Fall, 1905^{i c b}
- Xarifa Fall, 1905-01^{i c}
- Xestobium Motschulsky, 1845^{i c b}

Data sources: i = ITIS, c = Catalogue of Life, b = Bugguide.net

In addition, some sources include Ochina Sturm, 1826 here.
