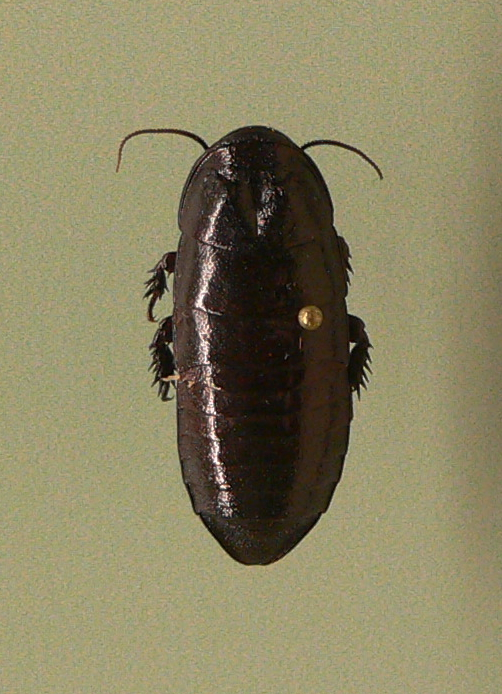

Scientific classification
- Kingdom: Animalia
- Phylum: Arthropoda
- Class: Insecta
- Order: Blattodea
- Family: Cryptocercidae
- Genus: Cryptocercus
- Species: C. garciai

Binomial name
- Cryptocercus garciai Burnside, Smith and Kambhampati, 1999

= Cryptocercus garciai =

Species of cockroach

Cryptocercus garciai is a species of wood roach named after American musician Jerry Garcia. It was discovered by Drs. Craig A. Burnside and Srinivas Kambhampati in 1998 in the Chattahoochee National Forest in northern Georgia. Prior to this, it was assumed that Cryptocercus punctulatus was the only species in the genus that existed in North America.

== See also ==
- List of organisms named after famous people (born 1925–1949)
