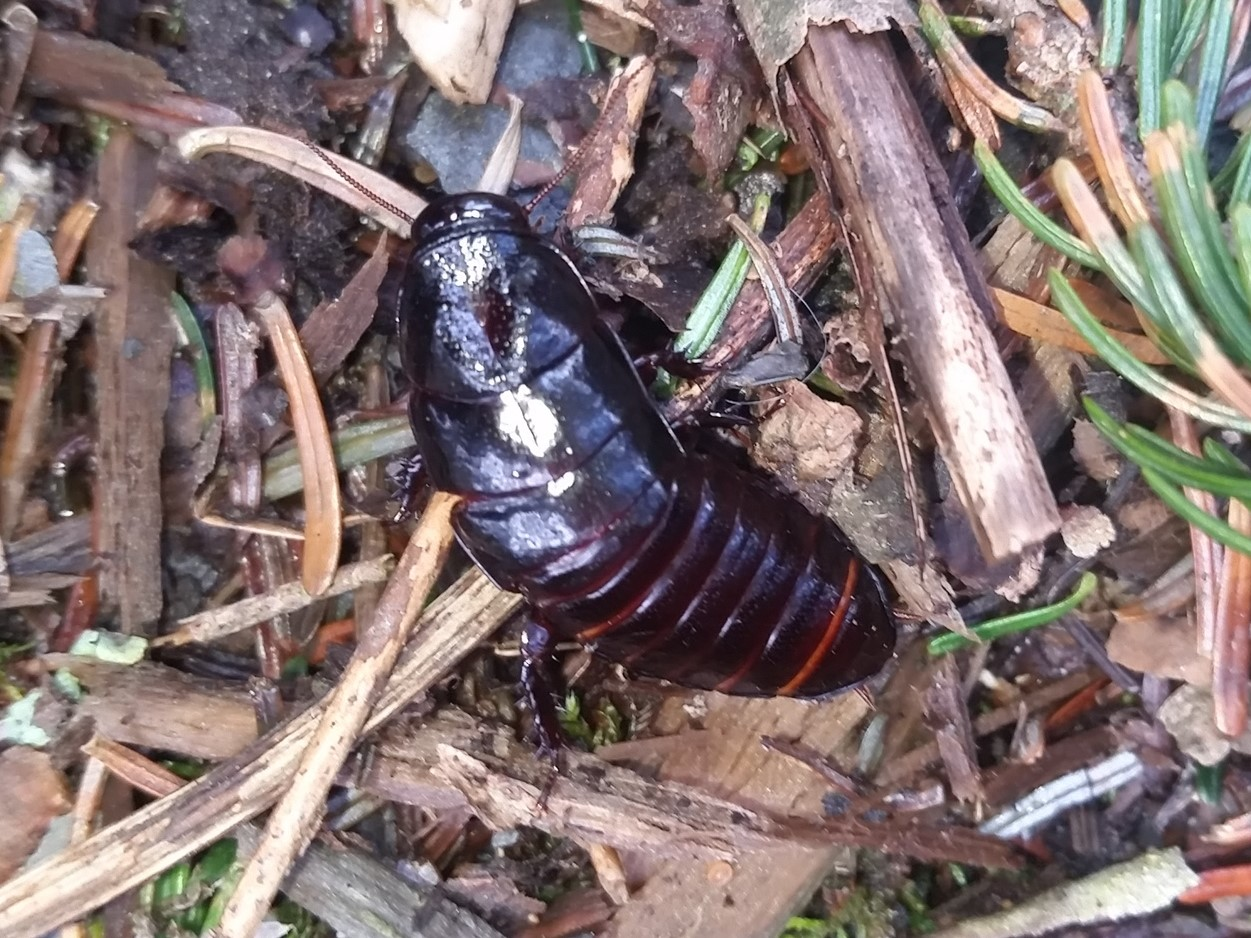

Scientific classification
- Domain: Eukaryota
- Kingdom: Animalia
- Phylum: Arthropoda
- Class: Insecta
- Order: Blattodea
- Family: Cryptocercidae
- Genus: Cryptocercus
- Species: C. wrighti

Binomial name
- Cryptocercus wrighti Burnside, Smith & Kambhampati, 1999

= Cryptocercus wrighti =

Species of cockroach

Cryptocercus wrighti is a species of cockroach in the family Cryptocercidae. It is found in North America.
