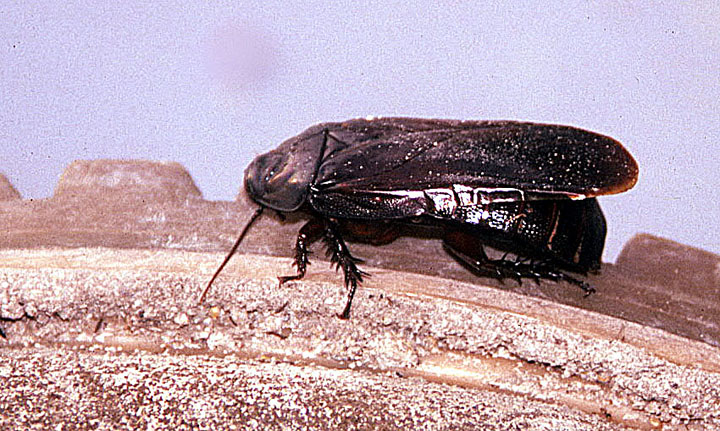
- A species of Panesthia cockroach

Scientific classification
- Kingdom: Animalia
- Phylum: Arthropoda
- Clade: Pancrustacea
- Class: Insecta
- Order: Blattodea
- Family: Blaberidae
- Subfamily: Panesthiinae

= Panesthiinae =

Cockroach subfamily

Panesthiinae is a subfamily of giant cockroaches (Blaberidae) mostly found in Indo-Malaysia and Australia.

Many species within this subfamily of cockroaches feed on wood, the best-studied being Panesthia angustipennis. Until recently it was believed that Panesthia and other members of Panesthiinae do not rely on the hindgut for wood digestion, but it is now believed that a "fiber-associated microbiome" might be contributing to up to 1/5th of the total xylanase and cellulase activities in the gut of P. angustipennis and the more social Salganea taiwanensis.

== Genera ==
The Cockroach species file and BioLib list:

1. Ancaudellia Shaw, 1925
2. Annamoblatta Sergeev, 1984
3. Caeparia Stål, 1877
4. Microdina Kirby, 1903
5. Miopanesthia Saussure, 1895
6. Panesthia Serville, 1831
7. Salganea Stål, 1877
