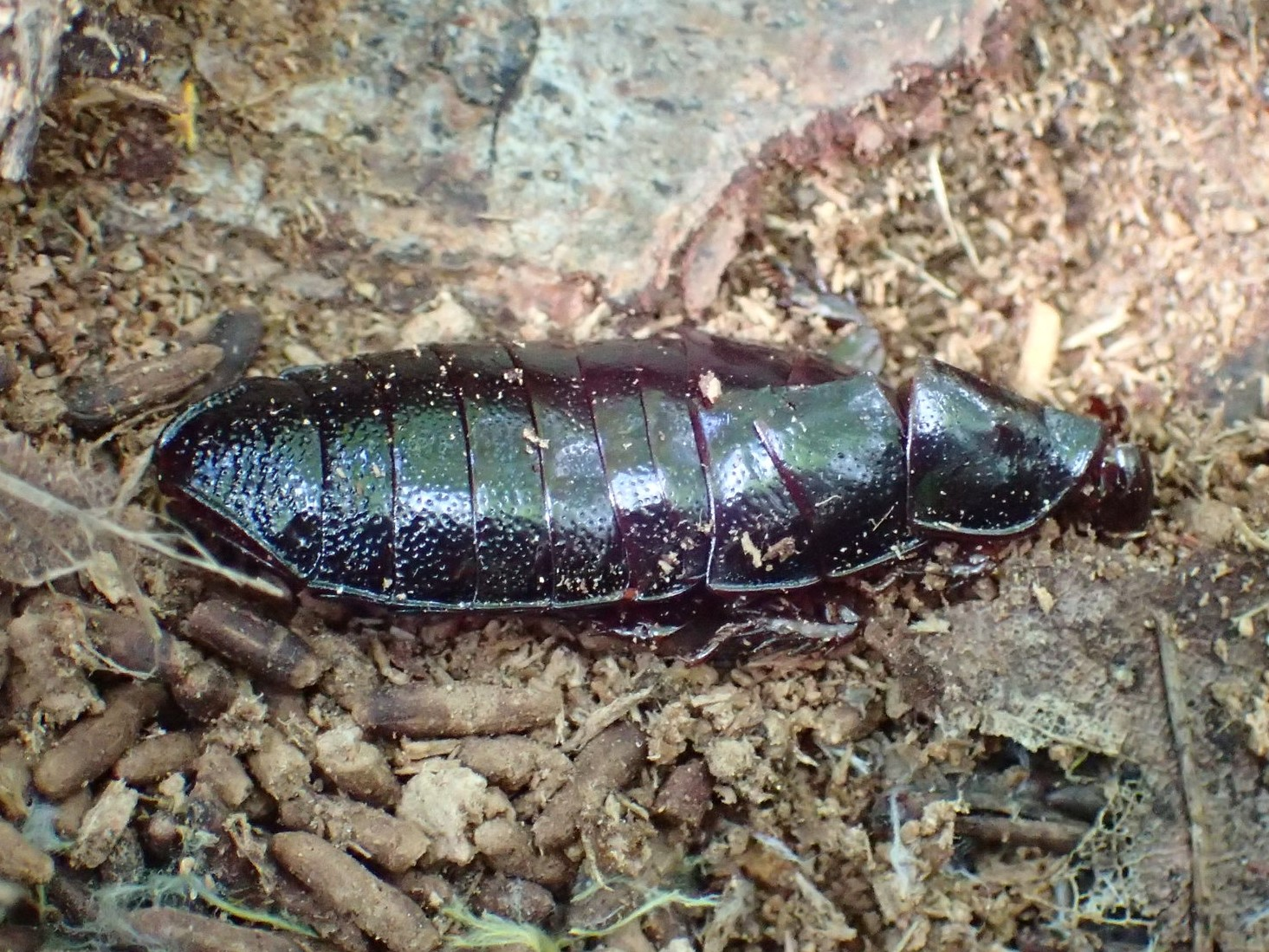

Scientific classification
- Domain: Eukaryota
- Kingdom: Animalia
- Phylum: Arthropoda
- Class: Insecta
- Order: Blattodea
- Family: Cryptocercidae
- Genus: Cryptocercus
- Species: C. darwini

Binomial name
- Cryptocercus darwini Burnside, Smith & Kambhampati, 1999

= Cryptocercus darwini =

Species of cockroach

Cryptocercus darwini is a species of cockroach in the family Cryptocercidae. It is found in North America.
