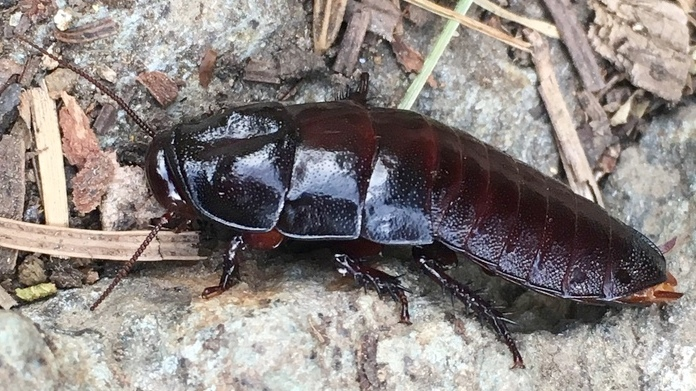
- Cryptocercus clevelandi

Scientific classification
- Kingdom: Animalia
- Phylum: Arthropoda
- Clade: Pancrustacea
- Class: Insecta
- Order: Blattodea
- Superfamily: Blattoidea
- Epifamily: Cryptocercoidae
- Family: Cryptocercidae; Handlirsch, 1925
- Genus: Cryptocercus; Scudder, 1862

Species
- See text

= Cryptocercus =

Cryptocercus - brown-hooded cockroaches

Genus of cockroaches

Cryptocercus is a genus of Dictyoptera (cockroaches and allies) and the sole member of its own family Cryptocercidae. Species are known as wood roaches or brown-hooded cockroaches. These roaches are subsocial, their young requiring considerable parental interaction. They also share wood-digesting gut bacteria types with wood-eating termites, and are therefore seen as evidence of a close genetic relationship, that termites are essentially evolved from social cockroaches.

Cryptocercus is especially notable for sharing numerous characteristics with termites, and phylogenetic studies have shown this genus is more closely related to termites than it is to other cockroaches. These two lineages probably shared a common ancestor in the early Cretaceous.

== Species ==
Found in North America and (especially temperate) Asia, there are 12 known species:

- Cryptocercus clevelandi Byers, 1997
- Cryptocercus darwini Burnside, Smith, Kambhampati, 1999
- Cryptocercus garciai Burnside, Smith, Kambhampati, 1999
- Cryptocercus hirtus Grandcolas, Bellés, 2005
- Cryptocercus kyebangensis Grandcolas, 2001
- Cryptocercus matilei Grandcolas, 2000
- Cryptocercus meridianus Grandcolas, Legendre, 2005
- Cryptocercus parvus Grandcolas, Park, 2005
- Cryptocercus primarius Bey-Bienko, 1938
- Cryptocercus punctulatus Scudder, 1862
- Cryptocercus relictus Bey-Bienko, 1935
- Cryptocercus wrighti Burnside, Smith, Kambhampati, 1999
