= Xylophagy =

Digestion of wood

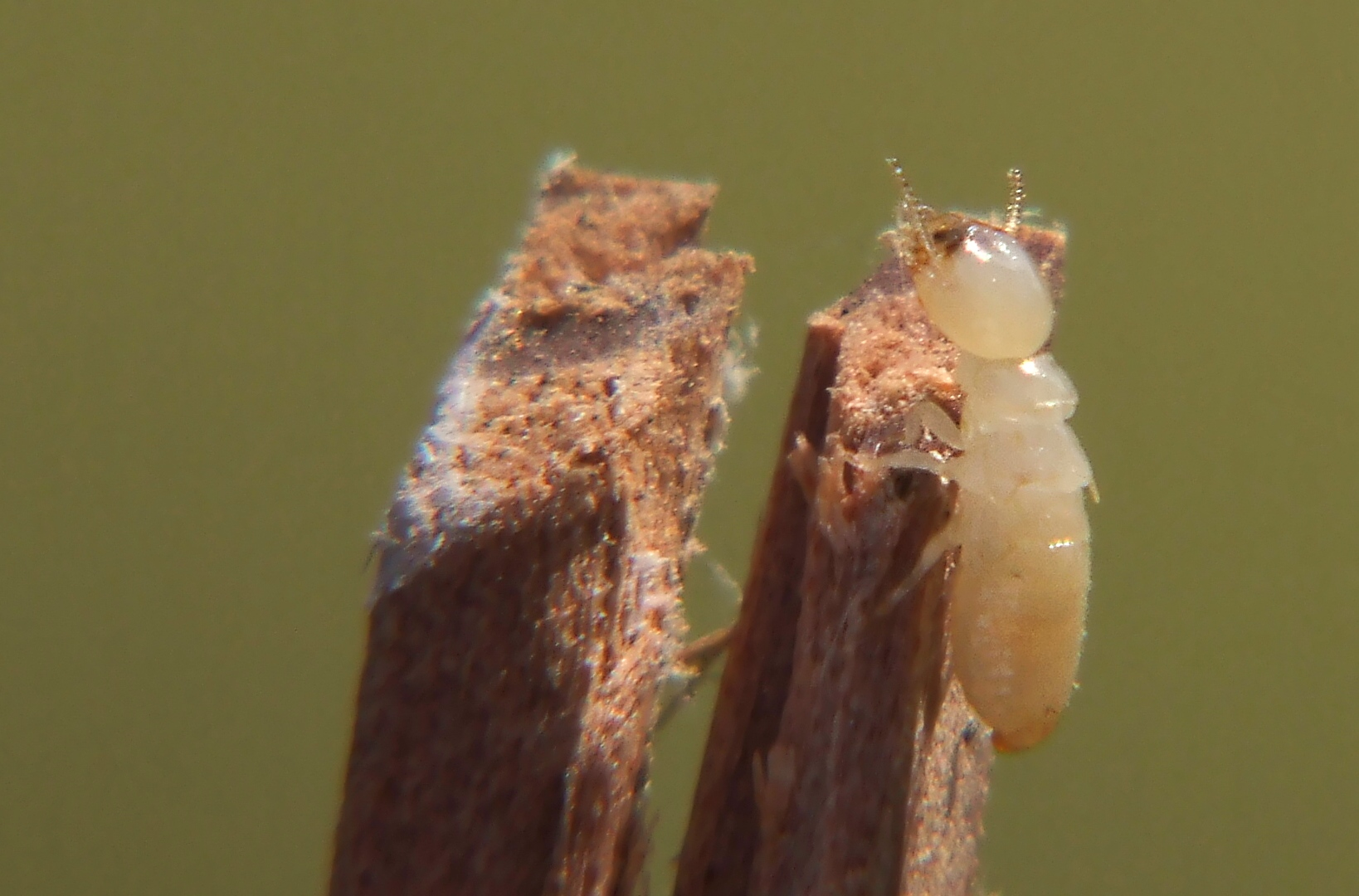
Worker termite

Xylophagy is the habit of an herbivorous animal whose diet consists primarily (often solely) of wood: that is, a xylophagous one. The word derives from Greek ξυλοφάγος (xulophagos) "eating wood", from ξύλον (xulon) "wood" and φαγεῖν (phagein) "to eat". Animals feeding only on dead wood are called sapro-xylophagous or saproxylic.

== Xylophagous insects ==
Most xylophagous animals are arthropods, primarily insects of various kinds, in which the behavior is quite common, and found in many different orders. It is not uncommon for insects to specialize to various degrees; in some cases, they limit themselves to certain plant groups (a taxonomic specialization), and in others, it is the physical characteristics of the wood itself (e.g., state of decay, hardness, whether the wood is alive or dead, or the choice of heartwood versus sapwood versus bark).

Many xylophagous insects have symbiotic protozoa and/or bacteria in their digestive system which assist in the breakdown of cellulose; others (e.g., the termite family Termitidae) possess their own cellulase. Others, especially among the groups feeding on decaying wood, derive much of their nutrition from the digestion of various fungi that are growing amidst the wood fibers. Such insects often carry the spores of the fungi in special structures on their bodies (called "mycangia"), and infect the host tree themselves when they are laying their eggs.

== Examples of wood-eating animals ==
- Cossidae moths
- Cockroaches in the genus Cryptocercus and in the subfamily Panesthiinae
- Dioryctria sylvestrella, the maritime pine borer, a snout moth in the Pyralidae family
- Gribbles
- Horntails
- Panaque (catfish)
- Sesiidae moths
- Shipworms
- Termites
- Wood-boring beetles, including various bark beetles, jewel beetles and longhorn beetles
- Woodlice
- Amphipods
- Squat lobster
