= List of Acalles species =

This is a list of 576 species in Acalles, a genus of hidden snout weevils in the family Curculionidae.

== Acalles species ==
- Acalles abstersus Boheman, 1837^{c}
- Acalles acerosus Erichson, 1842^{c}
- Acalles achadagrandensis Stüben, 2002^{c}
- Acalles acutus Wollaston, 1864^{c}
- Acalles adamsi Broun, 1893^{c}
- Acalles aeonii Wollaston, 1864^{c}
- Acalles aeonisimilis Stüben, 2000^{c}
- Acalles affinis Meyer, 1896^{c}
- Acalles africanus Solari & Solari, 1907^{c}
- Acalles albistrigalis Broun, 1909^{c}
- Acalles albivertex Chevrolat, 1879^{c}
- Acalles albocinctus Fiedler, 1940^{c}
- Acalles albolineatus Wollaston, 1854^{c}
- Acalles albopictus Jacquet, 1887^{c}
- Acalles albovittatus Fiedler, 1940^{c}
- Acalles alcarazensis Stüben, 2009^{c}
- Acalles algiricus Pic, 1905^{c}
- Acalles allostethus Broun, 1893^{c}
- Acalles alluaudi Uyttenboogaart, 1940^{c}
- Acalles almeriaensis Stüben, 2001^{c}
- Acalles alpestris Broun, 1893^{c}
- Acalles altus Broun, 1909^{c}
- Acalles amplicollis Fairmaire, 1849^{c}
- Acalles anagaensis Stüben, 2000^{c}
- Acalles analcisoides Kirsch, 1888-89^{c}
- Acalles anceps Broun, 1921^{c}
- Acalles anchonoides Champion, 1910^{c}
- Acalles angulicollis Rosenschoeld, 1837^{c}
- Acalles angulipennis Hustache, 1936^{c}
- Acalles angusticollis Sharp, 1885^{i c}
- Acalles apicalis Boheman, 1837^{c}
- Acalles apogaeus Peyerimhoff, 1925^{c}
- Acalles apogeus Peyerimhoff, 1925^{c}
- Acalles aptus Meyer, 1896^{c}
- Acalles arctus Broun, 1881^{c}
- Acalles argillosus Boheman, 1837^{c}
- Acalles asniensis Stüben, 2003^{c}
- Acalles aspersus Hustache, 1936^{c}
- Acalles aterrimus Broun, 1909^{c}
- Acalles atroplagiatus Fiedler, 1940^{c}
- Acalles attenuatus Blanchard, 1851^{c}
- Acalles aubei Boheman, 1837^{c}
- Acalles aulacus Broun, 1893^{c}
- Acalles australis Broun, 1893^{c}
- Acalles balcanicus Meyer, 1908^{c}
- Acalles basalis Leconte, 1876^{c}
- Acalles batorligetiensis Kaszab & Székessy, 1953^{c}
- Acalles bazaensis Stüben, 2001^{c}
- Acalles bellieri Reiche, 1860^{c}
- Acalles berberi Stüben in Stüben, Bahr, Germann, Behne & Bayer, 2005^{c}
- Acalles bicarinatus Fiedler, 1940^{c}
- Acalles bicinctus Broun, 1914^{c}
- Acalles bicostatus Broun, 1921^{c}
- Acalles bicristiceps Broun, 1914^{c}
- Acalles bifasciata Gerst., 1860^{c}
- Acalles bifasciatus Gerstäcker, 1860^{c}
- Acalles bilineatus Fiedler, 1940^{c}
- Acalles binodes Broun, 1921^{c}
- Acalles binodulus Champion, 1910^{c}
- Acalles biokovoensis Stüben, 2008^{c}
- Acalles bisignatus Pascoe, 1874^{c}
- Acalles bistrigosus Fiedler, 1940^{c}
- Acalles bodegensis Stüben, 2000^{c}
- Acalles breiti Solari & Solari, 1908^{c}
- Acalles brevipennis Broun, 1921^{c}
- Acalles brevis Tournier, 1873^{c}
- Acalles brevitarsis Wollaston, 1864^{c}
- Acalles brisouti Reitter, 1885^{c}
- Acalles brookesi Broun, 1921^{c}
- Acalles brunneus Suffrian, 1872^{c}
- Acalles bullatus Boheman, 1837^{c}
- Acalles callichroma Perkins, 1900^{i c}
- Acalles camelus (Fabricius, J.C., 1792)^{c g}
- Acalles campbellicus Brookes, 1951^{c}
- Acalles canescens Broun, 1881^{c}
- Acalles capiomonti H. Brisout, 1864^{c}
- Acalles carinatus LeConte, 1876^{i c b}
- Acalles carinicollis Tournier, 1873^{c}
- Acalles caucasicus Reitter, 1891^{c}
- Acalles cavicollis Champion, 1905^{c}
- Acalles cayennensis Rheinheimer, 2007^{c}
- Acalles cazorlaensis Stüben, 2004^{c}
- Acalles cedroensis Kulbe in Stüben, 2000^{c}
- Acalles certus Broun, 1880^{c}
- Acalles chaudoiri Hochh., 1847^{c}
- Acalles chaudoirii Hochhuth, 1847^{c}
- Acalles chlorolepis Perkins, 1900^{i c}
- Acalles cicatricosus Boheman, 1844^{c}
- Acalles cilicicollis Broun, 1921^{c}
- Acalles cilicollis Broun, 1921^{c}
- Acalles cinerascens Blanchard, 1851^{c}
- Acalles cinereus Wollaston, 1860^{c}
- Acalles cinericius Champion, 1905^{c}
- Acalles cingulatus Broun, 1886^{c}
- Acalles cisalpinus Stüben, 2003^{c}
- Acalles clathrata J. Lec., 1876^{c}
- Acalles clathratus Leconte, 1876^{c}
- Acalles clavatus (Say, 1831)^{i c b}
- Acalles clermonti Solari & Solari, 1905^{c}
- Acalles clunaris Chevrolat, 1879^{c}
- Acalles coarctatus Wollaston, 1857^{c}
- Acalles commutatus Dieckmann, 1982^{c}
- Acalles compactus Hustache, 1936^{c}
- Acalles compressus Fiedler, 1940^{c}
- Acalles comptus Broun, 1893^{c}
- Acalles concinnus Broun, 1893^{c}
- Acalles confusus Broun, 1914^{c}
- Acalles conicollis Broun, 1913^{c}
- Acalles conifer Erichson, 1842^{c}
- Acalles consors Broun, 1913^{c}
- Acalles contractus Broun, 1913^{c}
- Acalles cordaticollis Fiedler, 1940^{c}
- Acalles cordipennis Broun, 1881^{c}
- Acalles costatus Chevrolat, 1861^{c}
- Acalles costifer LeConte, 1884^{i c b}
- Acalles costipennis Fiedler, 1940^{c}
- Acalles costulatus Chevrolat, 1879^{c}
- Acalles crassisetis Champion, 1905^{c}
- Acalles crassulus LeConte, 1876^{i c}
- Acalles crenatus Hustache, 1936^{c}
- Acalles creticus Reitter, 1916^{c}
- Acalles cribricollis Pascoe, 1874^{c}
- Acalles cristatiger Blanchard, 1851^{c}
- Acalles cristatus Broun, 1880^{c}
- Acalles croaticus H. Brisout, 1867^{c}
- Acalles cryptobius Broun, 1893^{c}
- Acalles cunctans Boheman, 1844^{c}
- Acalles curtus Hamilton, 1893^{c}
- Acalles cylindricollis Wollaston, 1854^{c}
- Acalles cynerae Vitale, 1903^{c}
- Acalles cytisi Stüben, 2004^{c}
- Acalles decemcristatus Broun, 1886^{c}
- Acalles decoratus Blackburn, 1885^{i c}
- Acalles delirus Pascoe, 1874^{c}
- Acalles delumbatus Chevrolat,^{c}
- Acalles denominandus Solari & Solari, 1907^{c}
- Acalles denticollis Schoenherr, 1837^{c}
- Acalles dentigerus Broun, 1917^{c}
- Acalles dieckmanni Tempère & Péricart, 1989^{c}
- Acalles dilatata Cas., 1895^{c}
- Acalles dilatatus Casey, 1895^{c}
- Acalles diocletianus Bohem. in Schoenh., 1844^{c}
- Acalles discors Hoffmann, 1958^{c}
- Acalles dispar Wollaston, 1854^{c}
- Acalles distans Pascoe, 1874^{c}
- Acalles diversus Broun, 1886^{c}
- Acalles dolosus Broun, 1893^{c}
- Acalles doriae Pascoe, 1885^{c}
- Acalles dorsalis Broun, 1881^{c}
- Acalles dromedarius Boheman, 1844^{c}
- Acalles droueti Crotch, 1867^{c}
- Acalles dubius Solari & Solari, 1907^{c}
- Acalles dufaui Hustache, 1930^{c}
- Acalles duplex Sharp, 1885^{i c}
- Acalles echinatus Schoenherr, 1844^{c}
- Acalles editorum Peyerimhoff, 1913^{c}
- Acalles edoughensis Desbrochers, 1892^{c}
- Acalles episternalis Heller, 1935^{c}
- Acalles erinaceus Fiedler, 1940^{c}
- Acalles ernensis Broun, 1913^{c}
- Acalles errans Boheman, 1844^{c}
- Acalles erroneus Pascoe, 1876^{c}
- Acalles eruensis Broun, 1913^{c}
- Acalles eugeniae Perkins, 1916^{i c}
- Acalles euphorbiacus Stüben, 2000^{c}
- Acalles exaratus Champion, 1905^{c}
- Acalles exhumatus Wickham, H.F., 1913^{c g}
- Acalles expletus Pascoe, 1874^{c}
- Acalles extensithorax Rosenschoeld, 1837^{c}
- Acalles facilis Broun, 1893^{c}
- Acalles fallax Boheman, 1844^{c}
- Acalles farinosus Broun, 1898^{c}
- Acalles fasciculatus Boheman, 1844^{c}
- Acalles fausti Meyer, 1896^{c}
- Acalles favicollis Fiedler, 1940^{c}
- Acalles fernandezi Roudier, 1954^{c}
- Acalles ferrugineus Blanchard, 1851^{c}
- Acalles festivus Wollaston, 1857^{c}
- Acalles ficvorator Stüben, 2007^{c}
- Acalles figulinus Germ. in Dej., 1821^{c}
- Acalles fissicollis Penecke, 1926^{c}
- Acalles flavicaudis Colonnelli, 1994^{c}
- Acalles flavisetosus Broun, 1909^{c}
- Acalles flavomaculatus Voss, 1960^{c}
- Acalles floricola Broun, 1886^{c}
- Acalles flynni Broun, 1914^{c}
- Acalles flynsi Broun, 1914^{c}
- Acalles foraminosus Pascoe, 1874^{c}
- Acalles formosus Broun, 1898^{c}
- Acalles fortunatus Wollaston, 1864^{c}
- Acalles fossulatus Fiedler, 1940^{c}
- Acalles fougeri Hutton, 1898^{c}
- Acalles foveolatus Champion, 1905^{c}
- Acalles foveopunctatus Fiedler, 1942^{c}
- Acalles frater Perkins, 1900^{i c}
- Acalles frivolus Boheman, 1837^{c}
- Acalles frontalis Suffrian, 1872^{c}
- Acalles fuliginosus Fiedler, 1940^{c}
- Acalles fulvosparsus Fiedler, 1940^{c}
- Acalles fulvovittatus Champion, 1905^{c}
- Acalles furvus Broun, 1914^{c}
- Acalles fuscatus Broun, 1907^{c}
- Acalles fuscescens Blanchard, 1851^{c}
- Acalles fuscidorsis Broun, 1909^{c}
- Acalles fuscus Meyer, 1908^{c}
- Acalles gadorensis Stüben, 2001^{c}
- Acalles ganglbaueri Solari & Solari, 1908^{c}
- Acalles ganglionicus Boheman, 1837^{c}
- Acalles geophilus Lucas, 1860^{c}
- Acalles germanicus Letzner, 1882^{c}
- Acalles giraudi Mulsant, 1875?^{c}
- Acalles globulipennis Wollaston, 1854^{c}
- Acalles globulus Meyer, 1896^{c}
- Acalles gonoderus Chevrolat, 1879^{c}
- Acalles gracilipes Solari, 1938^{c}
- Acalles gracilis Broun, 1913^{c}
- Acalles graëllsi Martínez, 1873^{c}
- Acalles grancanariensis Stüben, 2000^{c}
- Acalles grandicollis Boheman, 1837^{c}
- Acalles granellus Boheman, 1844^{c}
- Acalles granosus LeConte, 1876^{i c}
- Acalles granulicollis Tournier, 1875^{c}
- Acalles granulifer Boheman, 1837^{c}
- Acalles granulimaculosus Stuben^{g}
- Acalles griseocaudatus Fairmaire, 1849^{c}
- Acalles grisescens Fiedler, 1940^{c}
- Acalles griseus Broun, 1886^{c}
- Acalles grossus Frieser, 1955^{c}
- Acalles guadarramaensis Stüben, 2004^{c}
- Acalles hakani Roudier, 1954^{c}
- Acalles haraforus Faust, 1887^{c}
- Acalles haraiorus Faust, 1887^{c}
- Acalles haraldi Roudier, 1954^{c}
- Acalles henoni Bedel, 1888^{c}
- Acalles hirsutus Hustache, 1936^{c}
- Acalles histrionicus Hustache, 1936^{c g}
- Acalles hopensis Broun, 1921^{c}
- Acalles horrens Champion, 1905^{c}
- Acalles horridulus Reitter, 1888^{c}
- Acalles horridus Broun, 1881^{c}
- Acalles hubbardi LeConte, 1880^{c}
- Acalles humeralis Perkins, 1900^{i c}
- Acalles humerosus Fairmaire, 1862^{c}
- Acalles humilis Blanchard, 1851^{c}
- Acalles hungaricus Hajóss, 1938^{c}
- Acalles hustachei O'Brien & Wibmer, 1982^{c}
- Acalles hypocrita Boheman, 1837^{c}
- Acalles hystriculus Pascoe, 1876^{c}
- Acalles hystrix Hustache, 1936^{c}
- Acalles iblanensis Stuben^{g}
- Acalles icarus Heyden, C. von & Heyden, L. von., 1866^{c g}
- Acalles igneus Broun, 1909^{c}
- Acalles ignotus Blackburn, 1885^{i c}
- Acalles immansuetus Boheman, 1837^{c}
- Acalles impexus Pascoe, 1877^{c}
- Acalles impressicollis Hustache, 1936^{c}
- Acalles incanus Fiedler, 1940^{c}
- Acalles incognitus Hoffmann, 1956^{c}
- Acalles incultus Broun, 1893^{c}
- Acalles indigens Fall, 1907^{i c b}
- Acalles indutus Champion, 1905^{c}
- Acalles inflatus Blatchley & Leng, 1916^{c}
- Acalles ingens Broun, 1893^{c}
- Acalles innotabilis Perkins, 1900^{i c}
- Acalles instabilis Hustache, 1936^{c g}
- Acalles integer Broun, 1898^{c}
- Acalles interpositus Frieser, 1955^{c}
- Acalles interruptus Suffrian, 1872^{c}
- Acalles intutus Pascoe, 1876^{c}
- Acalles italicus Solari & Solari, 1905^{c}
- Acalles kabylianus Desbrochers, 1898^{c}
- Acalles kippenbergi Dieckmann, 1982^{c}
- Acalles koae Perkins, 1900^{i c}
- Acalles korbi Stierlin, 1890^{c}
- Acalles kroni Hustache, 1936^{c}
- Acalles kronii Kirsch, 1877^{c}
- Acalles krueperi Faust, 1890^{c}
- Acalles laevirostris Chevrolat, 1879^{c}
- Acalles lanaiensis Perkins, 1900^{i c}
- Acalles lanzarotensis Stüben, 2000^{c}
- Acalles lateralis Sharp, 1885^{i c}
- Acalles lateritius Suffrian, 1872^{c}
- Acalles latescens Champion, 1905^{c}
- Acalles laticollis Boheman, 1837^{c}
- Acalles latirostris Broun, 1886^{c}
- Acalles lecorrei Rheinheimer, 2008^{c}
- Acalles lederi Meyer, 1896^{c}
- Acalles lemur Schoenherr, 1837^{c}
- Acalles lentisci Chevrolat, 1861^{c}
- Acalles lepidus Kulbe in Stüben, 2000^{c}
- Acalles lepirhinus Broun, 1893^{c}
- Acalles leporinus Chevrolat, 1879^{c}
- Acalles leptothorax Perkins, 1900^{i c}
- Acalles leviculus Broun, 1881^{c}
- Acalles lifuanus Hustache, 1936^{c}
- Acalles lineirostris Broun, 1911^{c}
- Acalles lineolatus Blanchard, 1851^{c}
- Acalles lituratus Blanchard, 1851^{c}
- Acalles longipilis Voss, 1960^{c}
- Acalles longiusculus Fiedler, 1942^{c}
- Acalles longulus Leconte, 1876^{c}
- Acalles longus Desbrochers, 1892^{c}
- Acalles lugionii A. & F. Solari, 1907^{c}
- Acalles luigionii Solari & Solari, 1907^{c}
- Acalles lunulatus Wollaston, 1854^{c}
- Acalles lusitanicus Solari & Solari, 1905^{c}
- Acalles lutosus Fiedler, 1940^{c}
- Acalles machadoi Stüben, 2006^{c}
- Acalles maculatus O'Brien & Wibmer, 1982^{c}
- Acalles maculipennis Fiedler, 1942^{c}
- Acalles magnicollis Boheman, 1837^{c}
- Acalles major Meyer, 1908^{c}
- Acalles maniensis Blackburn, 1885^{c}
- Acalles maraoensis Stüben, 2001^{c}
- Acalles maritimus Broun, 1893^{c}
- Acalles maroccensis Stüben, 2001^{c}
- Acalles mauiensis Blackburn, 1885^{i g}
- Acalles mauritanicus Solari & Solari, 1907^{c}
- Acalles melanolepis Perkins, 1900^{i c}
- Acalles memnonius Pascoe, 1874^{c}
- Acalles menetriesi Bohem., 1844^{c}
- Acalles menetriesii Boheman, 1844^{c}
- Acalles merkli Meyer, 1896^{c}
- Acalles meteoricus Meyer, 1909^{c}
- Acalles metrosiderae Broun, 1910^{c}
- Acalles micros Dieckmann, 1982^{c}
- Acalles milleri Reitt., 1883^{c}
- Acalles minimus Blatchley, 1916^{i c}
- Acalles minus Broun, 1893^{c}
- Acalles minutesquamosus Reiche, 1860^{c}
- Acalles minutissimus Alonso-Zarazaga & Lyal, 1999^{c b}
- Acalles minutus Fiedler, 1940^{c}
- Acalles misellus Boheman, 1844^{c}
- Acalles miserabilis Suffrian, 1872^{c}
- Acalles moerens Fiedler, 1940^{c}
- Acalles moestus Blanchard, 1851^{c}
- Acalles monasterialis Stüben, 2004^{c}
- Acalles monstrosus Frieser, 1955^{c}
- Acalles monticola Perkins, 1900^{i c}
- Acalles moraguezi Desbrochers, 1898^{c}
- Acalles muelleri Stüben, 2000^{c}
- Acalles mulleri Reitter, 1883^{c}
- Acalles multisetosus Broun, 1907^{c}
- Acalles mundus Broun, 1881^{c g}
- Acalles mutillaria Gerst., 1860^{c}
- Acalles mutillarius Gerstäcker, 1860^{c}
- Acalles navieresi Boheman, 1837^{c}
- Acalles neptunus Hustache, 1936^{c g}
- Acalles niger Hustache, 1936^{c}
- Acalles nigripennis Perkins, 1900^{i c}
- Acalles nobilis Leconte, 1876^{c}
- Acalles nocturnus Boheman, 1837^{c}
- Acalles nodifer Wollaston, 1854^{c}
- Acalles nodiferus Wollaston, 1854^{g}
- Acalles nodigerus Broun, 1917^{c}
- Acalles nodipennis Pic, 1906^{c}
- Acalles nodulosus Boheman, 1837^{c}
- Acalles normandi Solari & Solari, 1907^{c}
- Acalles notoporhinus Broun, 1914^{c}
- Acalles nubilosus Wollaston, 1864^{c}
- Acalles nuchalis Leconte, 1876^{c}
- Acalles nucleatus Pascoe, 1874^{c}
- Acalles nudiusculus Foerster, 1849^{c}
- Acalles oahuensis Perkins, 1900^{i c}
- Acalles obesus Schoenherr, 1837^{c}
- Acalles obliquefasciatus Fiedler, 1940^{c}
- Acalles oblitus Wollaston, 1854^{c}
- Acalles oceanicus Stüben, 2002^{c}
- Acalles ochsi Solari, 1952^{c}
- Acalles ohioensis Sleeper, 1953^{c}
- Acalles olcesei Tournier, 1873^{c}
- Acalles opilio Klug, 1850^{c}
- Acalles orbiculatus Hustache, 1936^{c}
- Acalles orientalis Hustache, 1936^{c}
- Acalles ornatus Wollaston, 1854^{c}
- Acalles ovalipennis Petri, 1912^{c}
- Acalles ovalis Fiedler, 1940^{c}
- Acalles ovatellus Broun, 1881^{c}
- Acalles ovipennis Fiedler, 1940^{c}
- Acalles ovulum Fiedler, 1940^{c}
- Acalles paganettii Solari, 1952^{c}
- Acalles pallens Blanchard, 1853^{c}
- Acalles pallidicollis Perkins, 1900^{i c}
- Acalles palmensis Roudier, 1954^{c}
- Acalles papei Meyer, 1908^{c}
- Acalles parasierrae Stüben, 2002^{c}
- Acalles parvulus Boheman, 1837^{c}
- Acalles pascoei Broun, 1880^{c}
- Acalles paulmeyeri Reitter, 1901^{c}
- Acalles pectoralis Leconte, 1876^{c}
- Acalles pedestris Stüben, 2000^{c}
- Acalles peelensis Broun, 1913^{c}
- Acalles pelionis Frieser, 1955^{c}
- Acalles peninsularis Hustache, 1931^{c}
- Acalles peragalloi Meyer, 1896^{c}
- Acalles perditus Pascoe, 1874^{c}
- Acalles perjurus Fairmaire, 1849^{c}
- Acalles perpusillus Pascoe, 1877^{c}
- Acalles pertusus Boheman, 1837^{c}
- Acalles petryszaki Dieckmann, 1982^{c}
- Acalles picatus Broun, 1893^{c}
- Acalles pici Solari & Solari, 1907^{c}
- Acalles piciventris Broun, 1909^{c}
- Acalles pictus Wollaston, 1864^{c}
- Acalles pilicornis Dejean, 1836^{c}
- Acalles pilula Hustache, 1936^{c g}
- Acalles pilularius Fiedler, 1940^{c}
- Acalles plagiatofasciatus Costa, 1847^{c}
- Acalles planidorsis Blanchard, 1851^{c}
- Acalles planipennis Hustache, 1930^{c}
- Acalles plebejus Suffrian, 1872^{c}
- Acalles plicatus Broun, 1893^{c}
- Acalles poneli Stüben, 2000^{c}
- Acalles porcatus Broun, 1898^{c}
- Acalles porcheti Hustache, 1936^{c}
- Acalles porosa J. Lec., 1876^{c}
- Acalles porosipennis Fiedler, 1940^{c}
- Acalles porosus Blatchley, 1916^{i c b}
- Acalles portosantoensis Stüben, 2002^{c}
- Acalles portusveneris Mayet, 1903^{c}
- Acalles portus-veneris Mayet, 1903^{c}
- Acalles posticalis Broun, 1886^{c}
- Acalles posticatus Fiedler, 1940^{c}
- Acalles poverus Blanchard, 1851^{c}
- Acalles praesetosus Broun, 1909^{c}
- Acalles profusa Cas., 1829^{c}
- Acalles profusus Casey, 1892^{c}
- Acalles provincialis Hoffmann, 1960^{c}
- Acalles ptinoides Stephens, 1831^{c}
- Acalles ptochoides Suffrian, 1872^{c}
- Acalles pulchellus H. Brisout, 1864^{c}
- Acalles pulverosus Gemminger, 1871^{c}
- Acalles pulverulentus Wollaston, 1854^{c}
- Acalles pumilus Hustache, 1936^{c}
- Acalles punctaticollis Solari & Solari, 1907^{c}
- Acalles puncticollis Broun, 1898^{c}
- Acalles pusillimus Perkins, 1903^{c}
- Acalles pusillissimus Perkins, 1910^{i c}
- Acalles pyrenaeus Boheman, 1844^{c}
- Acalles quadrinodosus Fiedler, 1940^{c}
- Acalles quadrituberculatus Champion, 1905^{c}
- Acalles quercus Boheman, 1844^{c}
- Acalles querilhaci H. Brisout, 1864^{c}
- Acalles quietus Broun, 1893^{c}
- Acalles raffrayi Desbrochers, 1871^{c}
- Acalles reitteri Meyer, 1896^{c}
- Acalles reynosae H. Brisout, 1867^{c}
- Acalles roboris Meyer, 1908^{c}
- Acalles robustus Broun, 1909^{c}
- Acalles rolleti Germ., 1824^{c}
- Acalles rolletii Germar, 1839^{c}
- Acalles rotundatus Blanchard, 1851^{c}
- Acalles rubeter Er., 1842^{c}
- Acalles rubetra Erichson, 1842^{c}
- Acalles rubricus Broun, 1884^{c}
- Acalles rudipennis Fiedler, 1940^{c}
- Acalles rudis Broun, 1881^{c}
- Acalles ruficollis Broun, 1898^{c}
- Acalles rufipes Chevrolat, 1879^{c}
- Acalles rufirostris Boheman, 1844^{c}
- Acalles rufotuberculatus Champion, 1905^{c}
- Acalles rugirostris Champion, 1905^{c}
- Acalles rugosus Pascoe, 1885^{c}
- Acalles rugulosus Champion, 1905^{c}
- Acalles rusticanus Rosenschoeld, 1837^{c}
- Acalles ruteri Roudier, 1954^{g}
- Acalles sablensis Blatchley, 1920^{i c}
- Acalles samoanus Marshall, 1931^{c}
- Acalles sardiniaensis Stüben, 2001^{c}
- Acalles sarothamni Stüben, 2003^{c}
- Acalles saxicola Hustache, 1936^{c}
- Acalles scabricollis Fiedler, 1940^{c}
- Acalles scabrosus Leconte, 1876^{c}
- Acalles scapularis Chevrolat, 1880^{c}
- Acalles scitus Broun, 1880^{c}
- Acalles senilis Wollaston, 1864^{c}
- Acalles sentus Broun, 1886^{c}
- Acalles septemcostatus Desbrochers, 1892^{c}
- Acalles setaceus Fiedler, 1952^{c}
- Acalles seticollis Hustache, 1936^{c}
- Acalles setifer Broun, 1886^{c}
- Acalles setosus Fiedler, 1940^{c}
- Acalles setulipennis Desbrochers, 1871^{c}
- Acalles seychellensis Champion, 1914^{c}
- Acalles sierrae H. Brisout, 1865^{c}
- Acalles sigma Hustache, 1936^{c g}
- Acalles signatus Blanchard, 1851^{c}
- Acalles silosensis Stüben, 2000^{c}
- Acalles simulator Roelofs, 1875^{c}
- Acalles sintraniensis Stüben, 1999^{c}
- Acalles solarii Hoffmann, 1958^{c}
- Acalles sonchi Stüben, 2000^{c}
- Acalles sophiae Tschapek, 1873^{c}
- Acalles sordidus Leconte, 1876^{c}
- Acalles spureus Broun, 1881^{c}
- Acalles squalidus Boheman, 1837^{c}
- Acalles squamiger Suffrian, 1872^{c}
- Acalles squamosus Solari & Solari, 1907^{c}
- Acalles sternalis Broun, 1917^{c}
- Acalles sticticus Broun, 1921^{c}
- Acalles stipulosus Suffrian, 1872^{c}
- Acalles stöckleini Frieser, 1959^{c}
- Acalles subcarinatus Broun, 1910^{c}
- Acalles subcostatus Fiedler, 1940^{c}
- Acalles subfasciatus Rosenschoeld, 1837^{c}
- Acalles subglaber Rosenhauer, 1856^{c}
- Acalles subglobatus Desbrochers, 1892^{c}
- Acalles subhispidus LeConte, 1878^{i c}
- Acalles sublineatus Fiedler, 1940^{c}
- Acalles sulcatipennis Fiedler, 1940^{c}
- Acalles sulcatus Boheman, 1844^{c}
- Acalles sulcicollis LeConte, 1884^{i c}
- Acalles sulcifrons Suffrian, 1872^{c}
- Acalles suturatus Dieckmann, 1983^{c}
- Acalles sycophanta Fairmaire, 1849^{c}
- Acalles sylvosus Blatchley, 1916^{i c}
- Acalles sympedioides Broun, 1893^{c}
- Acalles syriacus Pic, 1900^{c}
- Acalles tagasaste Stüben, 2000^{c}
- Acalles tantillus Champion, 1905^{c}
- Acalles temperei Péricart, 1987^{c}
- Acalles tenellus Fiedler, 1940^{c}
- Acalles tenuistriatus Fiedler, 1942^{c}
- Acalles terminalis Hustache, 1936^{c}
- Acalles terminatus Klug in Dej., 1821^{c}
- Acalles terricola Broun, 1886^{c}
- Acalles terrosus Suffrian, 1872^{c}
- Acalles testensis Stüben, 2003^{c}
- Acalles teter Boheman, 1844^{c}
- Acalles theryi Hustache, 1936^{c}
- Acalles tibialis Hustache, 1936^{c}
- Acalles tigreanus Hustache, 1940^{c}
- Acalles tolpis Stüben, 2002^{c}
- Acalles tolpivorus Germann & Stüben, 2006^{c}
- Acalles tortipes Broun, 1880^{c}
- Acalles triangulatus Broun, 1886^{c}
- Acalles tricinctus Champion, 1905^{c}
- Acalles trinotatus Broun, 1880^{c}
- Acalles triseriatus Champion, 1910^{c}
- Acalles tristaensis Stüben, 2002^{c}
- Acalles tristis Blanchard, 1851^{c}
- Acalles truquii Champion, 1910^{c}
- Acalles tuberculatus Perkins, 1900^{i c}
- Acalles tuberculosus Blanchard, 1851^{c}
- Acalles turbatus Boheman, 1844^{c}
- Acalles turbida J. Lec., 1876^{c}
- Acalles turbidus Leconte, 1876^{c}
- Acalles uncatus Desbrochers, 1895^{c}
- Acalles unicolor Montrouzier, 1860^{c}
- Acalles uraeus Boheman, 1837^{c}
- Acalles vadosopunctatus Fiedler, 1940^{c}
- Acalles vafrum Broun, 1881^{c}
- Acalles vairum Broun, 1881^{c}
- Acalles validus Hampe, 1864^{c}
- Acalles variegatus Stephens, 1831^{c}
- Acalles variolosus Stierlin, 1887^{c}
- Acalles varius Gemminger, 1871^{c}
- Acalles vau Wollaston, 1854^{c}
- Acalles ventrosus LeConte, 1878^{c}
- Acalles veratrus Broun, 1883^{c}
- Acalles verrucifer Fiedler, 1942^{c}
- Acalles verrucosus Wollaston, 1863^{c}
- Acalles versicolor Fiedler, 1940^{c}
- Acalles vicarius Dan., 1906^{c}
- Acalles vividus Broun, 1880^{c}
- Acalles volens Broun, 1881^{c}
- Acalles vorsti Stuben^{g}
- Acalles wilkesi Perkins in Bryan, 1925^{c}
- Acalles wilkesii Bryan (Perkins in), 1926^{c}
- Acalles wollastoni Chevrolat, 1852^{c}
- Acalles xanthostictus Broun, 1893^{c}
- Acalles xenorhinus Broun, 1898^{c}
- Acalles xerampelinus Wollaston, 1864^{g}
- Acalles zenomorphus Broun, 1917^{c}
- Acalles zumpti Uyttenboogaart, 1939^{c}

Data sources: i = ITIS, c = Catalogue of Life, g = GBIF, b = Bugguide.net
