= Didymus =

Didymus (Greek for "twin") may refer to:

== People ==
=== Didymus ===
- Arius Didymus (fl. 1st century BC), Stoic philosopher
- Thomas the Apostle (died 72 AD), also known as Didymus
- Didymus Chalcenterus (63 BC–10 AD), Hellenistic scholar and grammarian
- Didymus the Blind (313–398), ecclesiastical writer of Alexandria
- Didymus the Musician, music theorist in Alexandria of the 1st century
- Didymus (died 304), 4th century martyr and companion of Theodora
- Didymus (family of Honorius), a member of the House of Theodosius
- Didymus Mutasa (born 1935), Minister of National Security in Zimbabwe

=== Didymos ===
- Didymos (music theorist), ancient Greek music theorist
- Didymos I (1921–2014), Catholicos of the East and Malankara Metropolitan, the Primate of the Malankara Church of India from 2005 to 2010.

== Fictional characters ==
- Sir Didymus, a fictional character from the movie Labyrinth

== Animals ==
- Didymus (beetle), a genus of weevils found in New Zealand, the Kermadec and Norfolk Islands
- Leptodactylus didymus, a species of frog in Bolivia and Peru

== Other ==
- 65803 Didymos, an asteroid forming a twin pair with Dimorphos (the target of the DART mission)

== See also ==
- The dictionary definition of δίδυμος at Wiktionary
- Didimus, a genus of beetle
- Didymos (disambiguation)
