= Didymos =

Didymos may refer to:

- 65803 Didymos, a near-Earth asteroid
- Didymos (music theorist), ancient Greek music theorist
- Several other ancient Greeks more commonly spelt Didymus; see Didymus (disambiguation)
- Didymos I (1921–2014), Oriental Orthodox bishop

== See also ==
- The dictionary definition of δίδυμος at Wiktionary
- Didimus, a genus of beetles
- Didymo (Didymosphenia geminata), a species of diatom
- Didymoi, Roman fortlet in Egypt
- Didymus (disambiguation)
