= Acalles porosus =

Scientific classification
- Domain: Eukaryota
- Kingdom: Animalia
- Phylum: Arthropoda
- Class: Insecta
- Order: Coleoptera
- Suborder: Polyphaga
- Infraorder: Cucujiformia
- Family: Curculionidae
- Genus: Acalles
- Species: A. porosus

Binomial name
- Acalles porosus Blatchley, 1916

Species of weevil beetle

Acalles porosus is a species of hidden snout weevil in the family of beetles known as Curculionidae. It is found in North America.
