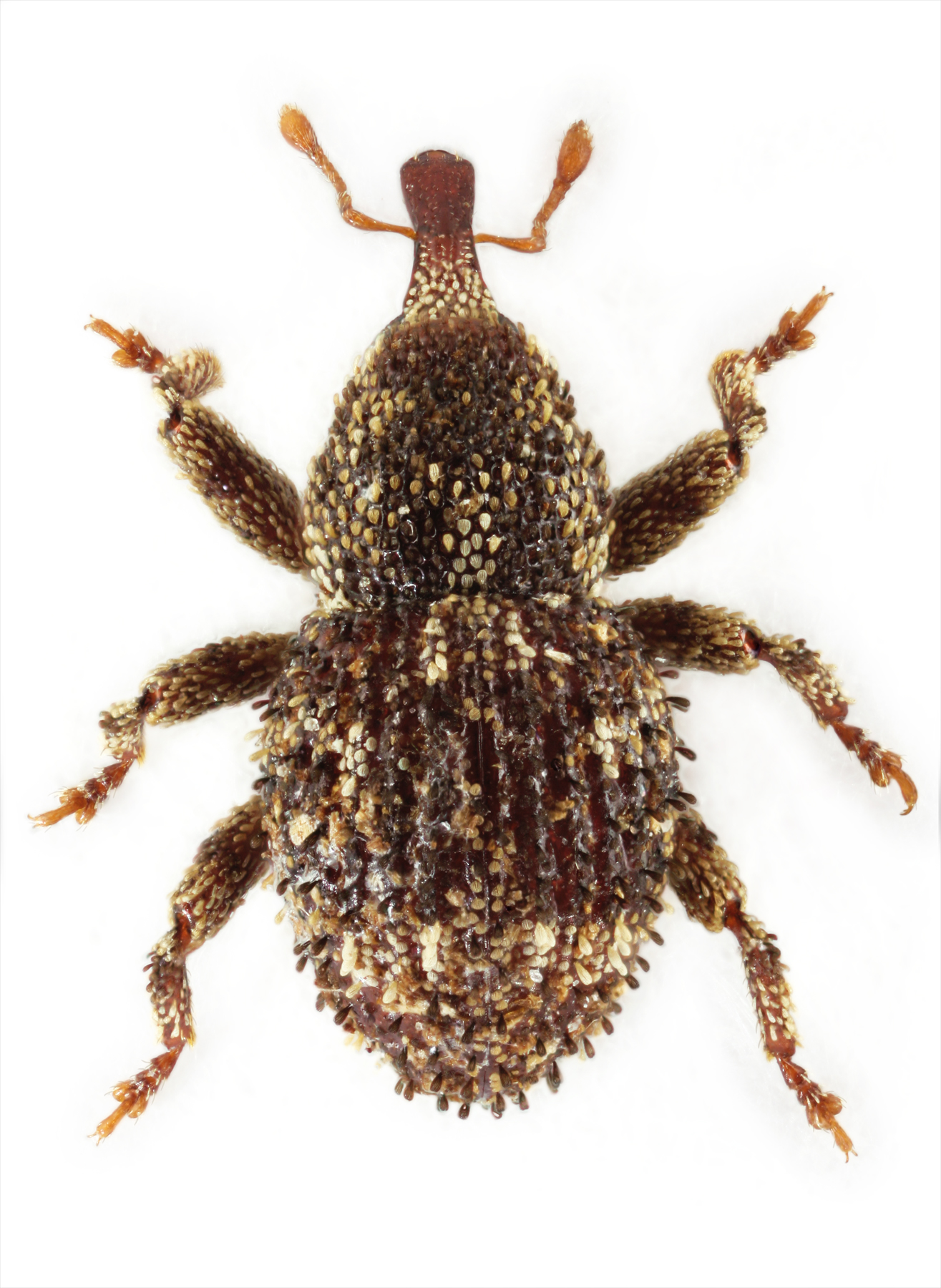
- Imago

Scientific classification
- Kingdom: Animalia
- Phylum: Arthropoda
- Clade: Pancrustacea
- Class: Insecta
- Order: Coleoptera
- Suborder: Polyphaga
- Infraorder: Cucujiformia
- Family: Curculionidae
- Genus: Acalles
- Species: A. echinatus

Binomial name
- Acalles echinatus (Germar, 1824)

Synonyms
- Cryptorhynchus echinatus Germar, 1824; Acalles squamosus A. Solari & F. Solari, 1907

= Acalles echinatus =

Species of beetle

Acalles echinatus is species of beetle from the family Curculionidae. It inhabits Europe and the Transcaucasia.

== Taxonomy ==
This species was first described in 1824 by Ernst Friedrich Germar under the name Cryptorhynchus echinatus. The type locality was indicated as "Carniolia", in the present-day Slovenia.

Acalles echinatus, together with nine other species, forms the echinatus group within the genus Acalles, characterized by a triangular shape edeagusa. Sibling species for A. echinatus are Acalles fallax and Acalles petryszaki.
