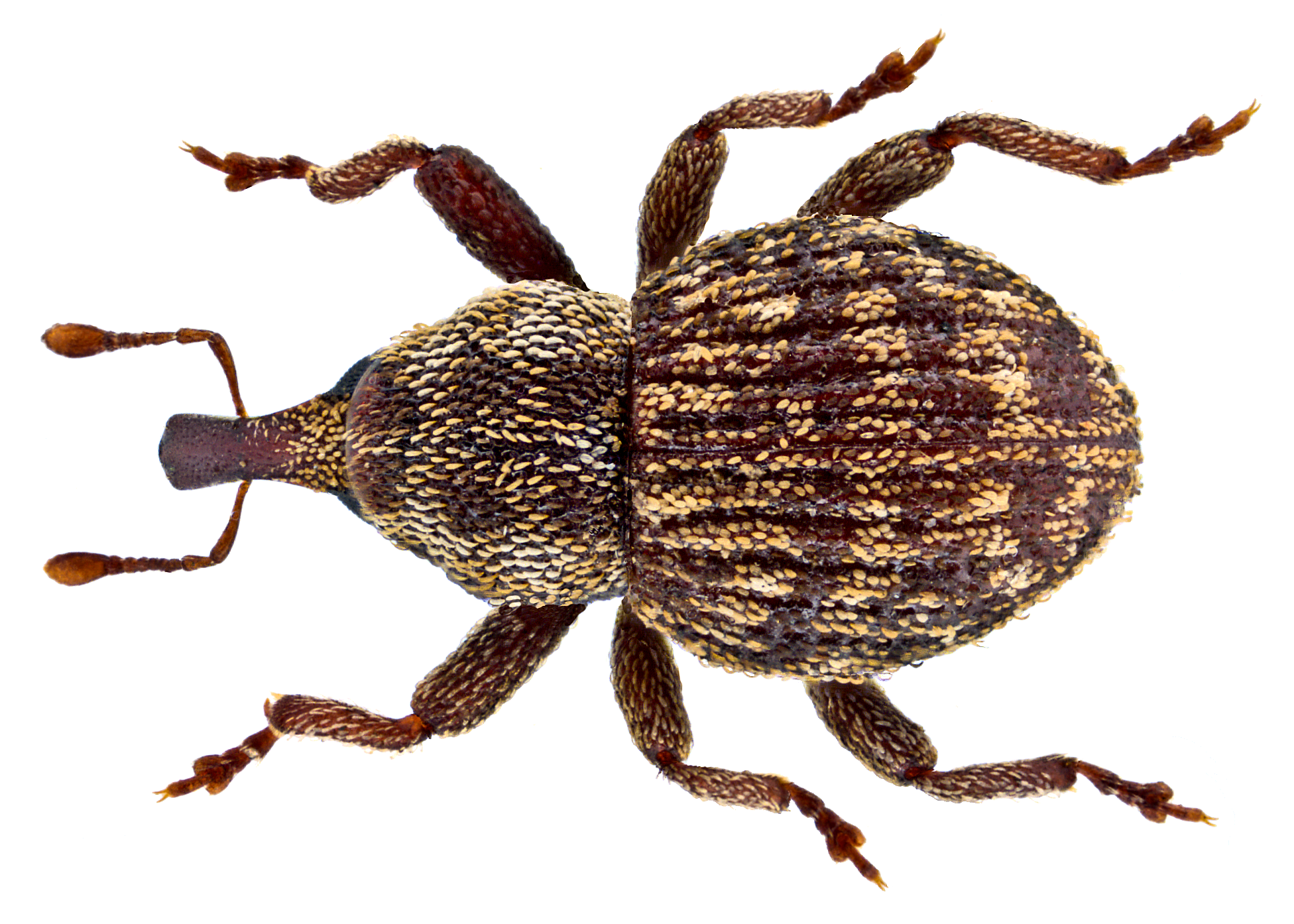
- Acalles ptinoides 3 mm. England

Scientific classification
- Kingdom: Animalia
- Phylum: Arthropoda
- Class: Insecta
- Order: Coleoptera
- Suborder: Polyphaga
- Infraorder: Cucujiformia
- Family: Curculionidae
- Genus: Acalles
- Species: A. ptinoides

Binomial name
- Acalles ptinoides (Marsham, 1802)

= Acalles ptinoides =

Species of beetle

Acalles ptinoides is a species of weevil native to Europe.
