= Acalles indigens =

Scientific classification
- Domain: Eukaryota
- Kingdom: Animalia
- Phylum: Arthropoda
- Class: Insecta
- Order: Coleoptera
- Suborder: Polyphaga
- Infraorder: Cucujiformia
- Family: Curculionidae
- Genus: Acalles
- Species: A. indigens

Binomial name
- Acalles indigens Fall, 1907

Species of weevil beetle

Acalles indigens is a species of hidden snout weevil in the family of beetles known as Curculionidae. It is found in North America.
