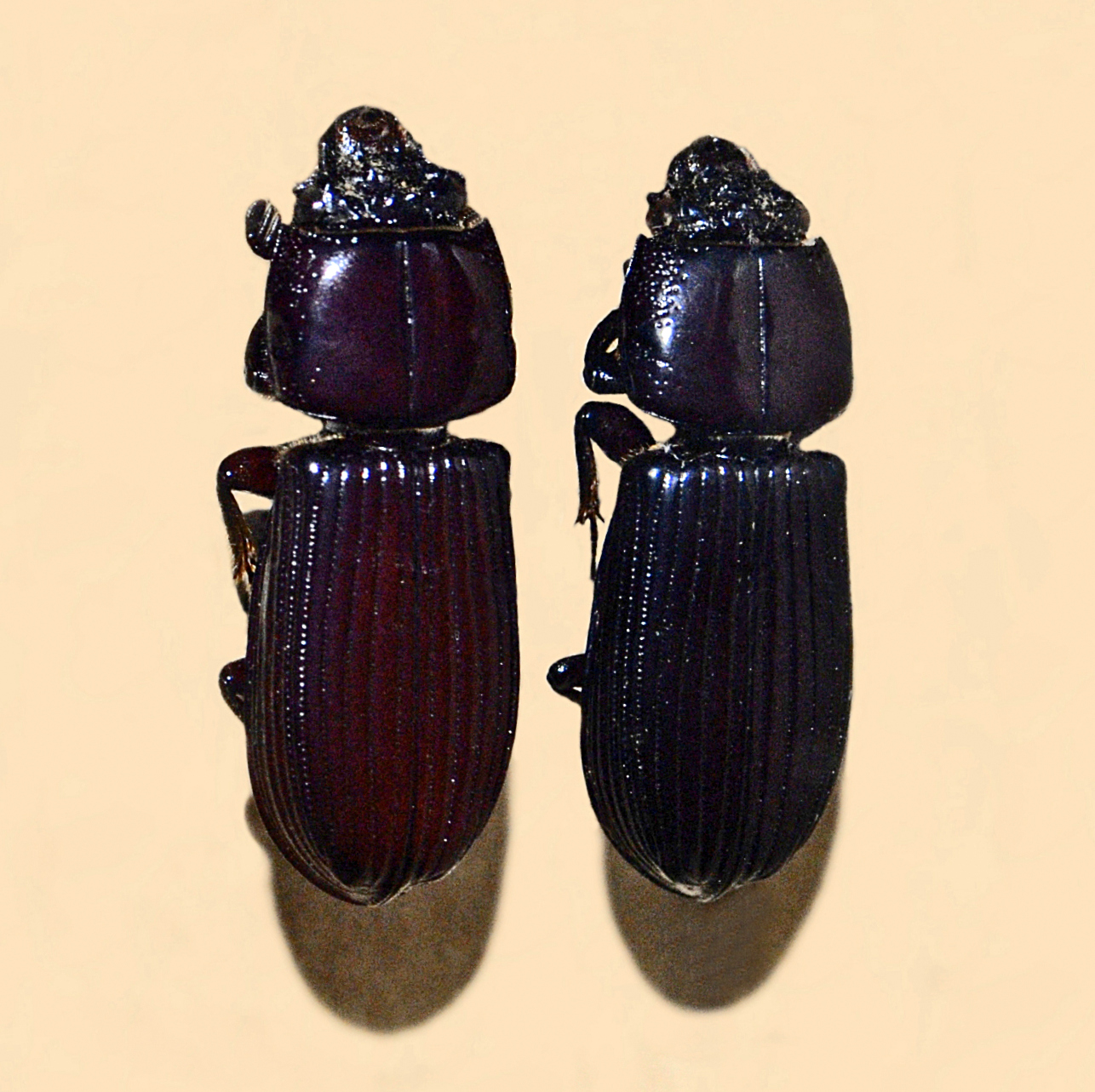
- Didimus parastictus from Bioko Island

Scientific classification
- Kingdom: Animalia
- Phylum: Arthropoda
- Class: Insecta
- Order: Coleoptera
- Suborder: Polyphaga
- Infraorder: Scarabaeiformia
- Family: Passalidae
- Genus: Didimus
- Species: D. parastictus

Binomial name
- Didimus parastictus Imhoff, 1843

= Didimus parastictus =

Species of beetle

Didimus parastictus is a species of beetles of the family Passalidae.

== Description ==
Body is elongate-cylindrical and black overall. The head is narrower than the thorax. The elytra are elongate with almost parallel sides, and heavily striated.

== Distribution ==
This species is present in the countries of the Gulf of Guinea.
