= Acalles costifer =

Scientific classification
- Kingdom: Animalia
- Phylum: Arthropoda
- Class: Insecta
- Order: Coleoptera
- Suborder: Polyphaga
- Infraorder: Cucujiformia
- Family: Curculionidae
- Genus: Acalles
- Species: A. costifer

Binomial name
- Acalles costifer LeConte, 1884

Species of weevil beetle

Acalles costifer is a species of hidden snout weevil in the beetle family Curculionidae. It is found in North America.
