= Acalles carinatus =

Scientific classification
- Kingdom: Animalia
- Phylum: Arthropoda
- Class: Insecta
- Order: Coleoptera
- Suborder: Polyphaga
- Infraorder: Cucujiformia
- Family: Curculionidae
- Genus: Acalles
- Species: A. carinatus

Binomial name
- Acalles carinatus LeConte, 1876

Species of weevil beetle

Acalles carinatus is a species of hidden snout weevil in the beetle family Curculionidae. It is found in North America.
