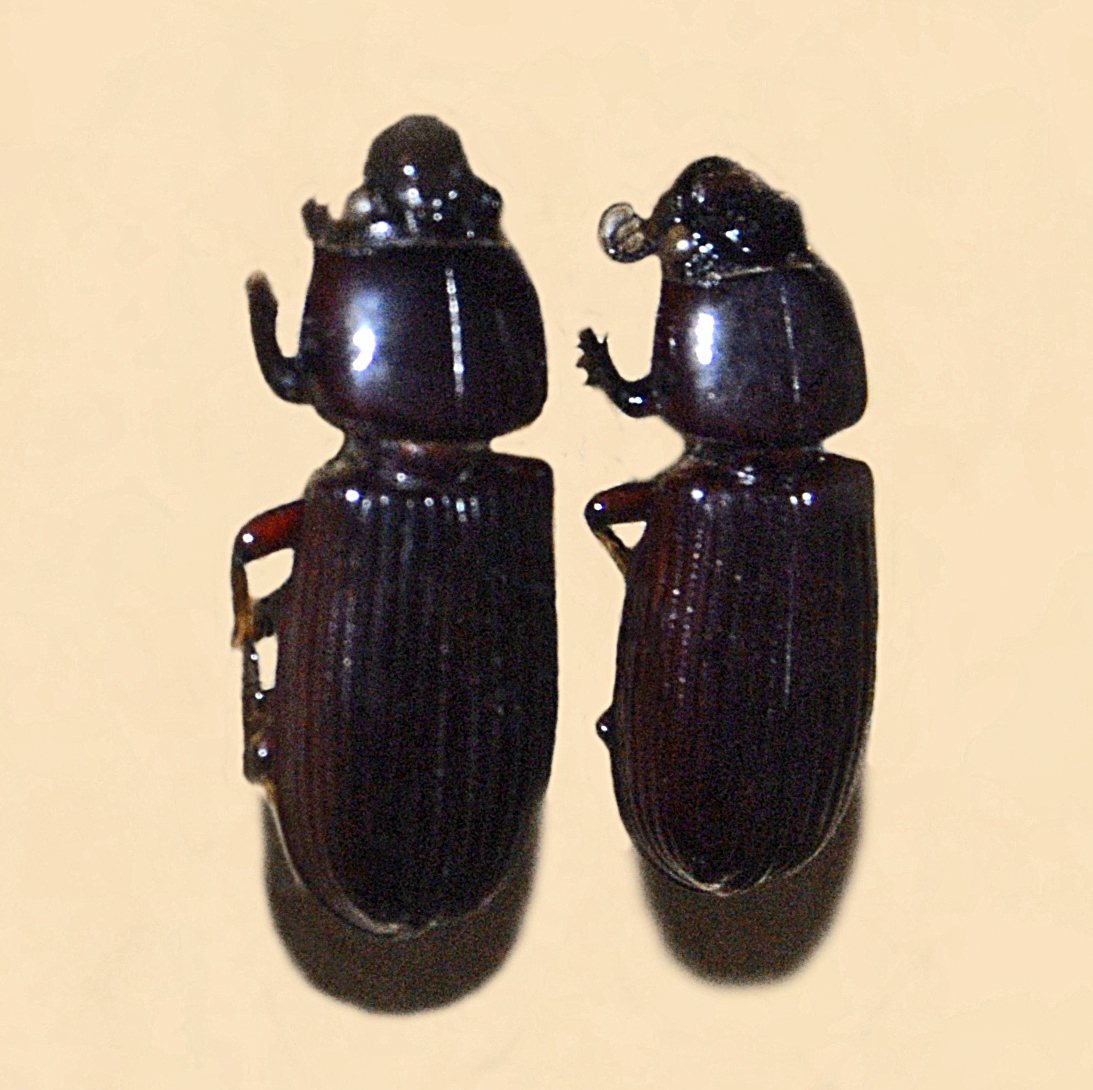
- Didimus laevis from São Tomé and Príncipe

Scientific classification
- Domain: Eukaryota
- Kingdom: Animalia
- Phylum: Arthropoda
- Class: Insecta
- Order: Coleoptera
- Suborder: Polyphaga
- Infraorder: Scarabaeiformia
- Family: Passalidae
- Genus: Didimus
- Species: D. laevis

Binomial name
- Didimus laevis (Klug, 1835)

Synonyms
- Passalus laevis Klug, 1835

= Didimus laevis =

Species of beetle

Didimus laevis is a species of Beetle in the family Passalidae.

== Description ==
Body is elongate-cylindrical and black overall. The head is narrower than the thorax. The elytra are elongate with almost parallel sides, and heavily striated.

== Distribution ==
This species is present in São Tomé and Príncipe.
