= Acalles clavatus =

Scientific classification
- Domain: Eukaryota
- Kingdom: Animalia
- Phylum: Arthropoda
- Class: Insecta
- Order: Coleoptera
- Suborder: Polyphaga
- Infraorder: Cucujiformia
- Family: Curculionidae
- Genus: Acalles
- Species: A. clavatus

Binomial name
- Acalles clavatus (Say, 1831)

Synonyms
- Acalles scabrosus LeConte, 1876

Species of weevil beetle

Acalles clavatus is a species of hidden snout weevil in the beetle family Curculionidae.
