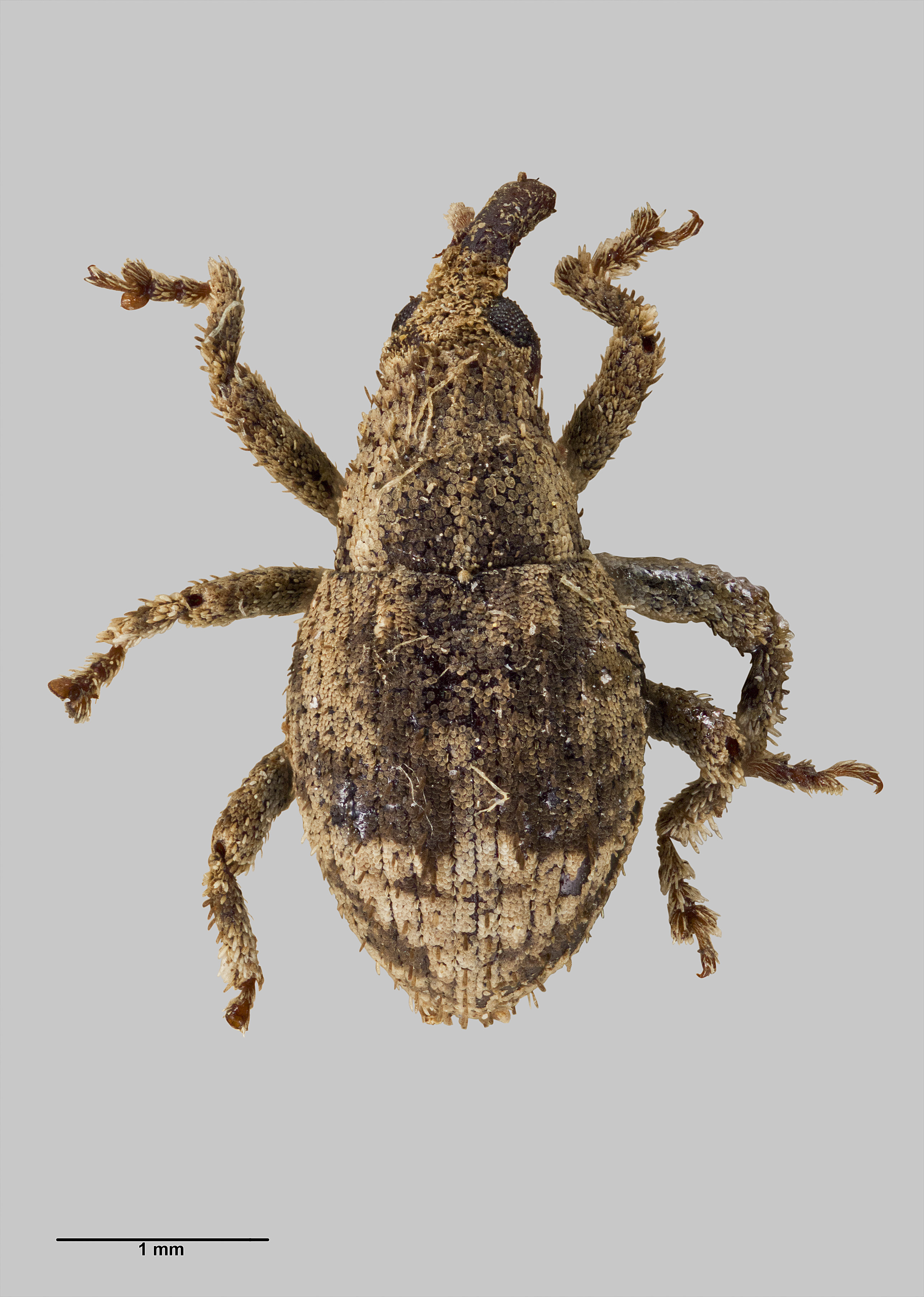

Scientific classification
- Kingdom: Animalia
- Phylum: Arthropoda
- Class: Insecta
- Order: Coleoptera
- Suborder: Polyphaga
- Infraorder: Cucujiformia
- Family: Curculionidae
- Genus: Didymus
- Species: D. metrosideri

Binomial name
- Didymus metrosideri (Broun, 1910)

Synonyms
- Acalles metrosiderae Broun, 1910

= Didymus metrosideri =

Species of beetle

Didymus metrosideri is an endemic weevil from the Kermadec Islands in New Zealand. This species was discovered by W. L. Wallace during the 1908 Kermedec Islands expedition.

== Taxonomy ==
D. metrosideri was originally described by Thomas Broun as Acalles metrosiderae. In 1982 G. Kuschel proposed that the new genus Didymus replace the original genus Acalles.

== Distribution ==
Specimens of this beetle have been discovered on Raoul Island and on Macauley Island.
