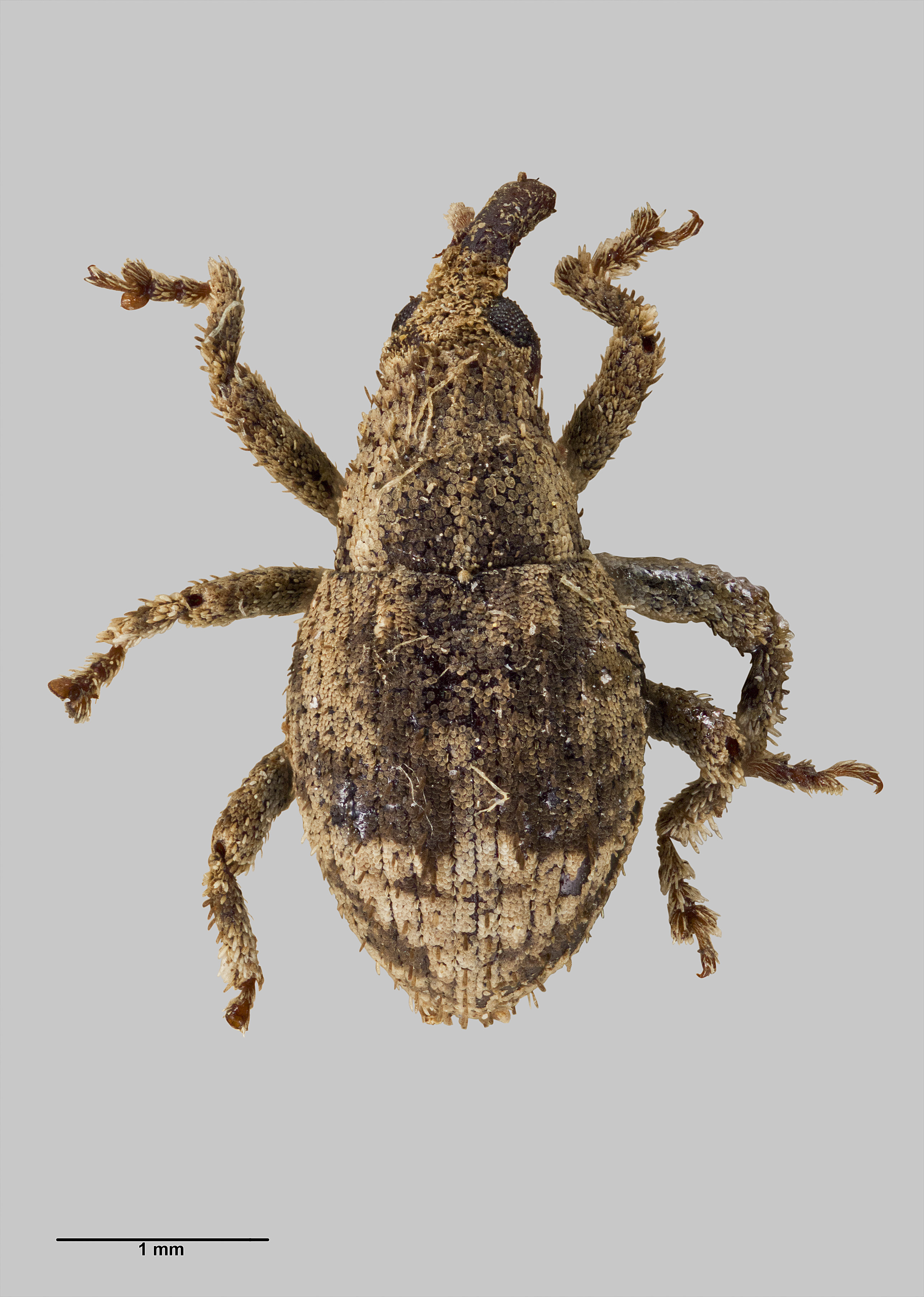
- Didymus metrosideri

Scientific classification
- Domain: Eukaryota
- Kingdom: Animalia
- Phylum: Arthropoda
- Class: Insecta
- Order: Coleoptera
- Suborder: Polyphaga
- Infraorder: Cucujiformia
- Family: Curculionidae
- Subfamily: Cryptorhynchinae
- Genus: Didymus; Kuschel, 1982

Species
- see text

= Didymus (beetle) =

Genus of beetles

Didymus is a genus of beetles known as weevils (insects in the family Curculionidae). The genus contains the following species:

- Didymus bicostatus
- Didymus erroneous
- Didymus impexus
- Didymus intutus
- Didymus metrosideri
- Didymus setosus

The type species for this genus is Acalles intutus Pascoe, 1876 by original designation. Species from this genus are found in New Zealand, the Kermadec and the Norfolk Islands.
