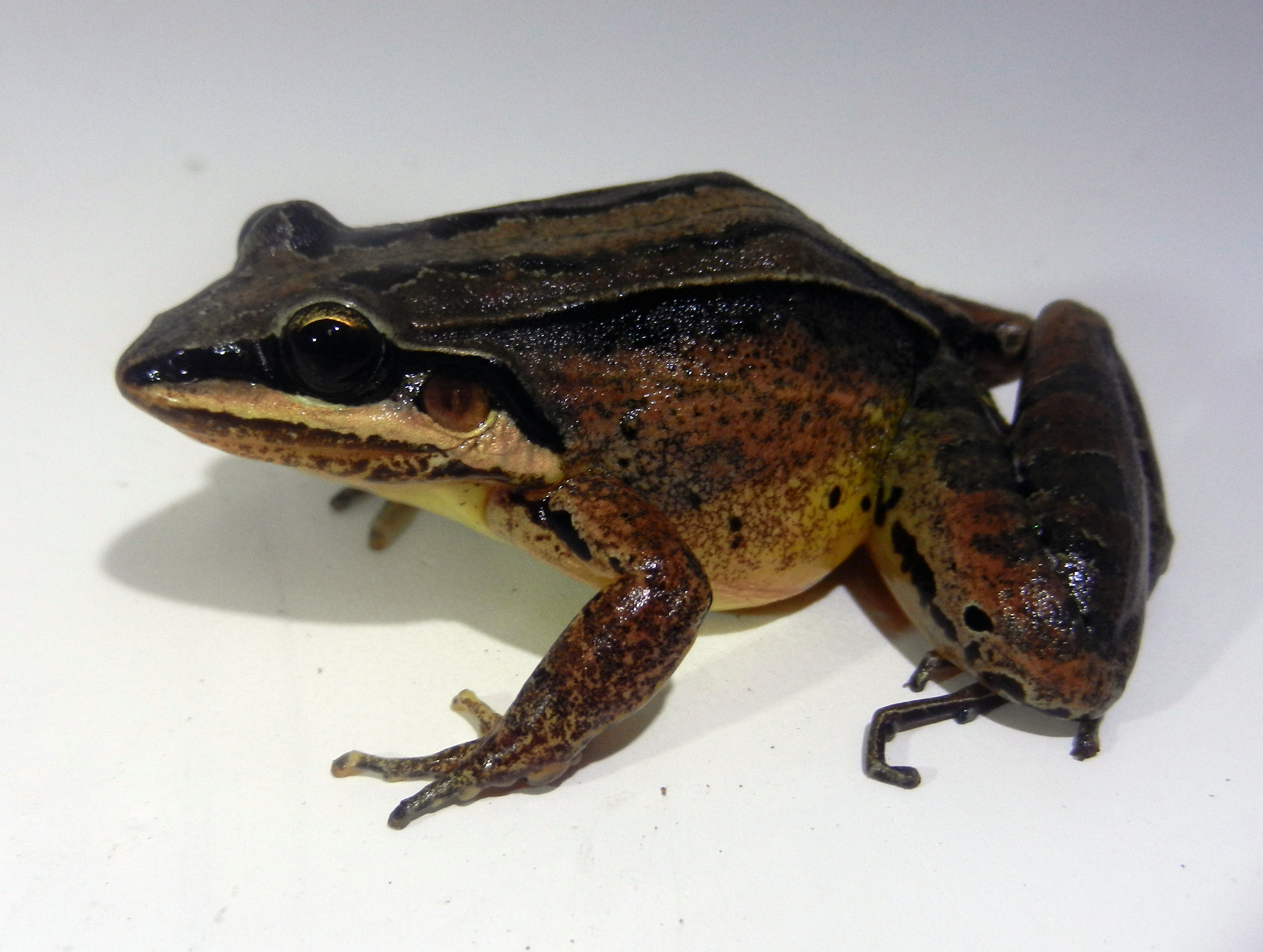

Conservation status
- Least Concern (IUCN 3.1)

Scientific classification
- Kingdom: Animalia
- Phylum: Chordata
- Class: Amphibia
- Order: Anura
- Family: Leptodactylidae
- Genus: Leptodactylus
- Species: L. didymus

Binomial name
- Leptodactylus didymus Heyer, Garcia-Lopez & Cardoso, 1996

= Leptodactylus didymus =

Madre de Dios thin-toed frog

Species of amphibian

Leptodactylus didymus, the Madre de Dios thin-toed frog, is a species of frog in the family Leptodactylidae. It is found in Bolivia, Brazil, and Peru.

== Habitat ==
This terrestrial frog has been seen in primary and secondary rainforests and sometimes urban areas. Scientists have seen it between 0 and 450 meters above sea level.

Scientists have reported the frog in protected places: Tambopata National Reserve, Parque Ambiental Chico Mendes, Reserva Experimental Catuaba, Parque Nacional da Serra do Divisor, and Parque Zoobotânico da Universidade Federal do Acre in Brazil.

== Reproduction ==
This frog deposits its eggs in a nest out of bubbles, a few hundred at a time. The tadpoles have been observed aggregating to survive low-water conditions.

== Threats ==
The IUCN classifies this frog as least concern of extinction.
