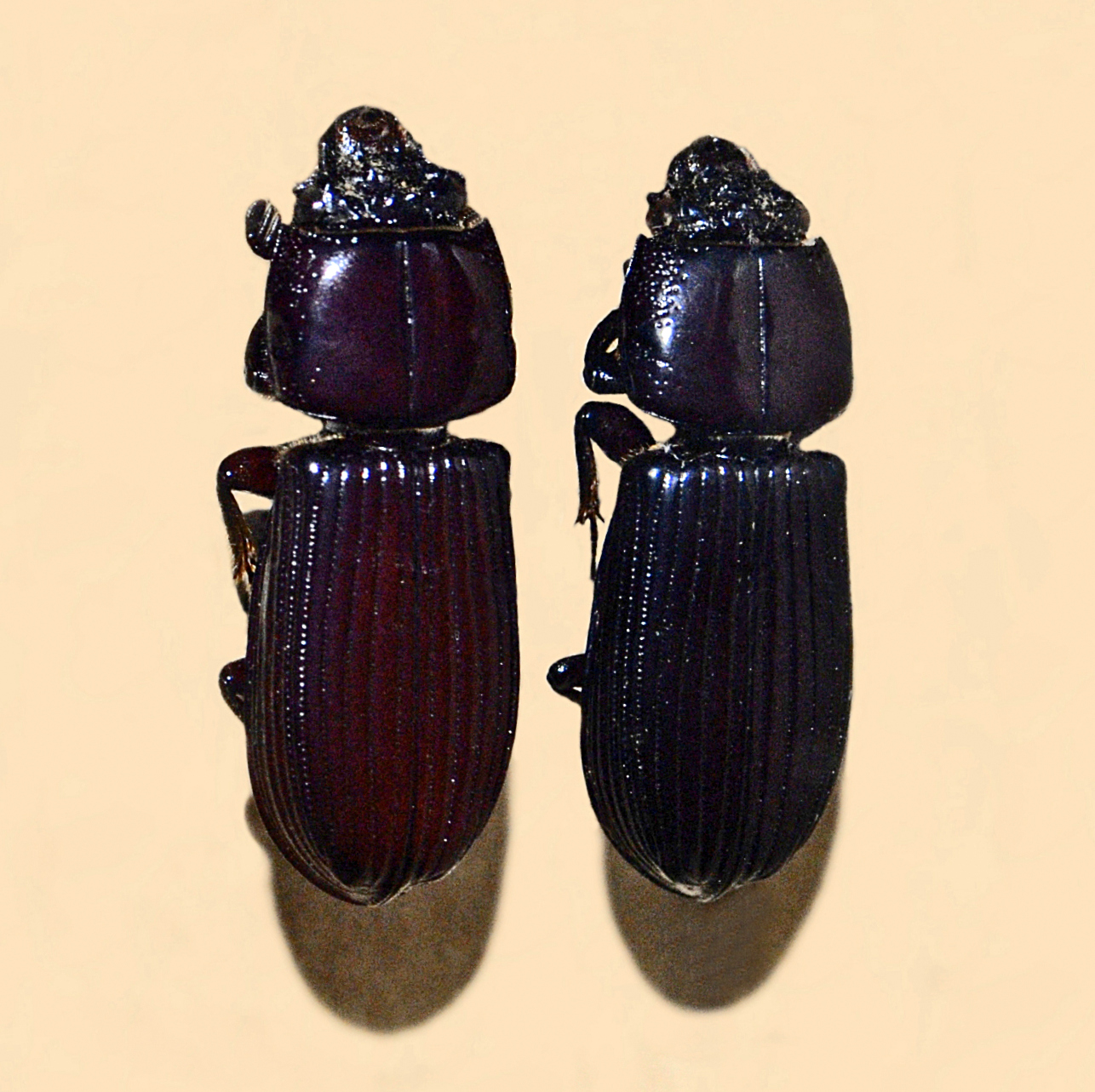
- Didimus parastictus

Scientific classification
- Domain: Eukaryota
- Kingdom: Animalia
- Phylum: Arthropoda
- Class: Insecta
- Order: Coleoptera
- Suborder: Polyphaga
- Infraorder: Scarabaeiformia
- Family: Passalidae
- Genus: Didimus; Kaup 1871

Synonyms
- Didimoides Kuwert, 1891; Didimoïdes Kuwert, 1891; Didymoides Hincks, 1933; Didymus Hincks, 1933; Eumelosomus Kuwert, 1891

= Didimus =

Genus of beetles

Didimus is a genus of beetles of the family Passalidae.

== Distribution ==
These beetles can be found in tropical Africa.

== Species ==
- Didimus aberrans (Kuwert, 1898)
- Didimus africanus (Percheron, 1844)
- Didimus aloysiisabaudiae (Pangella, 1906)
- Didimus alvaradoi Corella, 1941
- Didimus communis (Kuwert, 1898)
- Didimus crassus Arrow, 1906 (1907)
- Didimus ealaensis Hincks, 1933
- Didimus haroldi Kuwert, 1898
- Didimus knutsoni Auriv., 1886
- Didimus laevis (Klug, 1835)
- Didimus latifrons Corella, 1941
- Didimus latipunctus Zang, 1905
- Didimus nachtigali Kuwert, 1891
- Didimus parastictus (Imohoff, 1843)
- Didimus punctipectus (Kaup, 1868)
- Didimus ruwenzoricus Arrow, 1906 (1907)
- Didimus sansibaricus Harold, 1880
- Didimus simulator Kuwert, 1891
- Didimus wissmanni (Kuwert, 1891)
