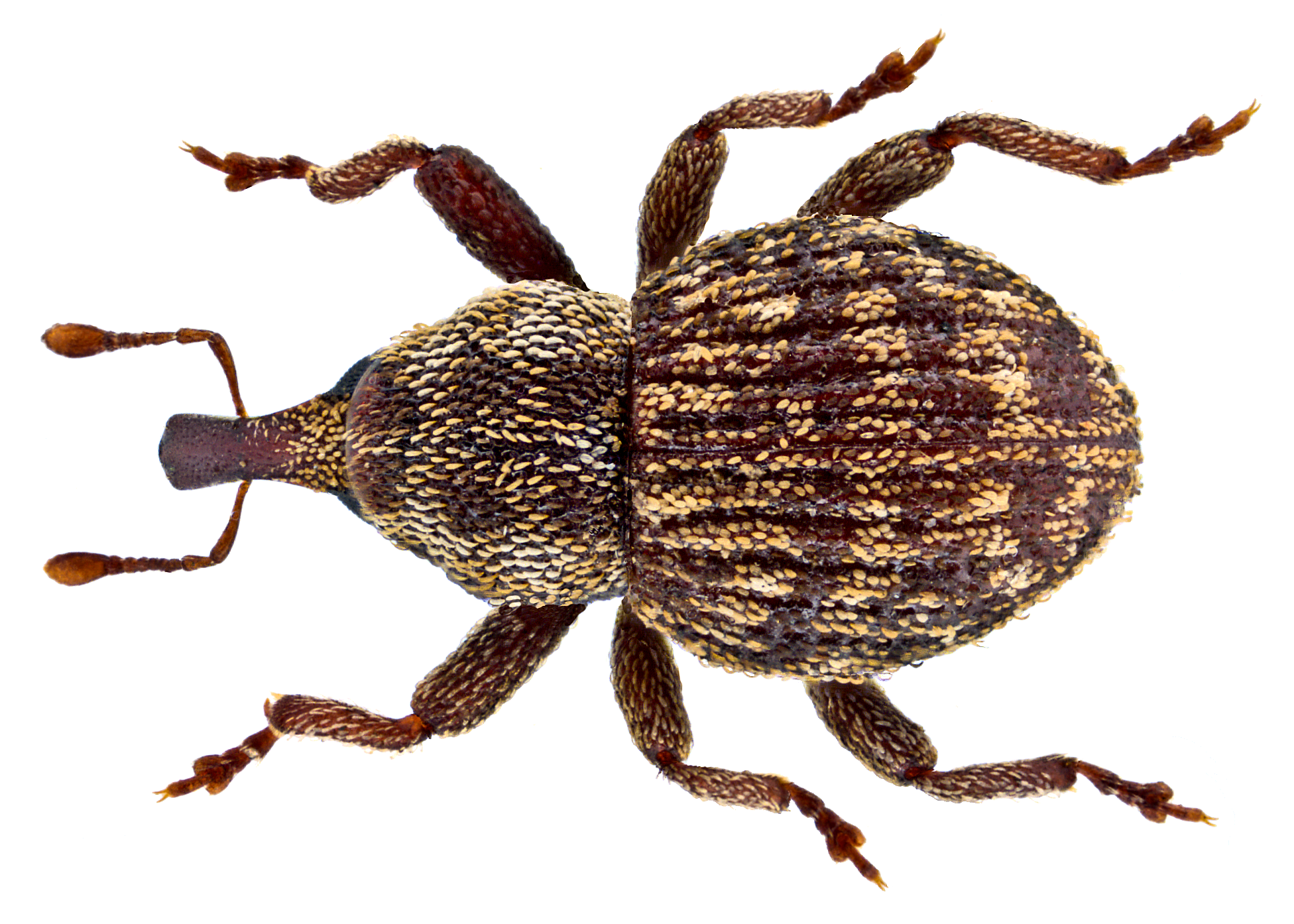
- Acalles ptinoides

Scientific classification
- Kingdom: Animalia
- Phylum: Arthropoda
- Clade: Pancrustacea
- Class: Insecta
- Order: Coleoptera
- Suborder: Polyphaga
- Infraorder: Cucujiformia
- Superfamily: Curculionoidea
- Family: Curculionidae
- Subfamily: Cryptorhynchinae
- Genus: Acalles; Schönherr, 1825

Diversity
- About 570 species

= Acalles =

Genus of beetles

Acalles is a genus of beetles in the family Curculionidae. Beetles of this genus can be found in the Western Palaearctic (Europe and Northwest Africa) and in southeastern North America where they live among leaf litter or dead branches and vines. There are about 570 species in the Acalles genus.

== See also ==
- List of Acalles species
