= Robertia (disambiguation) =

Robertia Boonstra, 1948, is an extinct genus of therapsids.

Robertia may also refer to:

Animals:

- Robertia Travassos & Kloss, 1961, a synonym of the nematode genus Traklosia
- Robertia Saaristo, 2006, a synonym of the spider genus Seycellesa

Plants:

- Robertia Mérat, an invalid synonym of Eranthis (Ranunculaceae)
- Robertia Scopoli, an invalid synonym Sideroxylon (Sapotaceae)

== See also ==
- Robertians, a ruling family of the Kingdom of the Franks
- Robertsia, a genus of wasps
