= Salesia =

Salesia may refer to:

- a Hystrignathidae
- incorrect form of Salesian
