= Artigasia =

Scientific classification
- Kingdom: Animalia
- Phylum: Nematoda
- Class: Chromadorea
- Order: Rhabditida
- Family: Hystrignathidae
- Genus: Artigasia; Christie, 1934

Synonyms
- Paraxyo Travassos & Kloss, 1958

Genus of nematodes

Artigasia is a genus of nematodes belonging to the family Hystrignathidae. It was described from the gut caeca of Passalus interstitialis found in Escaleras de Jaruco, La Habana Province, and El Pan de Matanzas, Matanzas Province, both in Cuba.

Species:

- Artigasia ensicrinata (Hunt, 1981)
- Artigasia milerai Morffe & García, 2010
- Artigasia monodelpha Travassos & Kloss, 1958
- Artigasia pauliani Théodoridès, 1955
