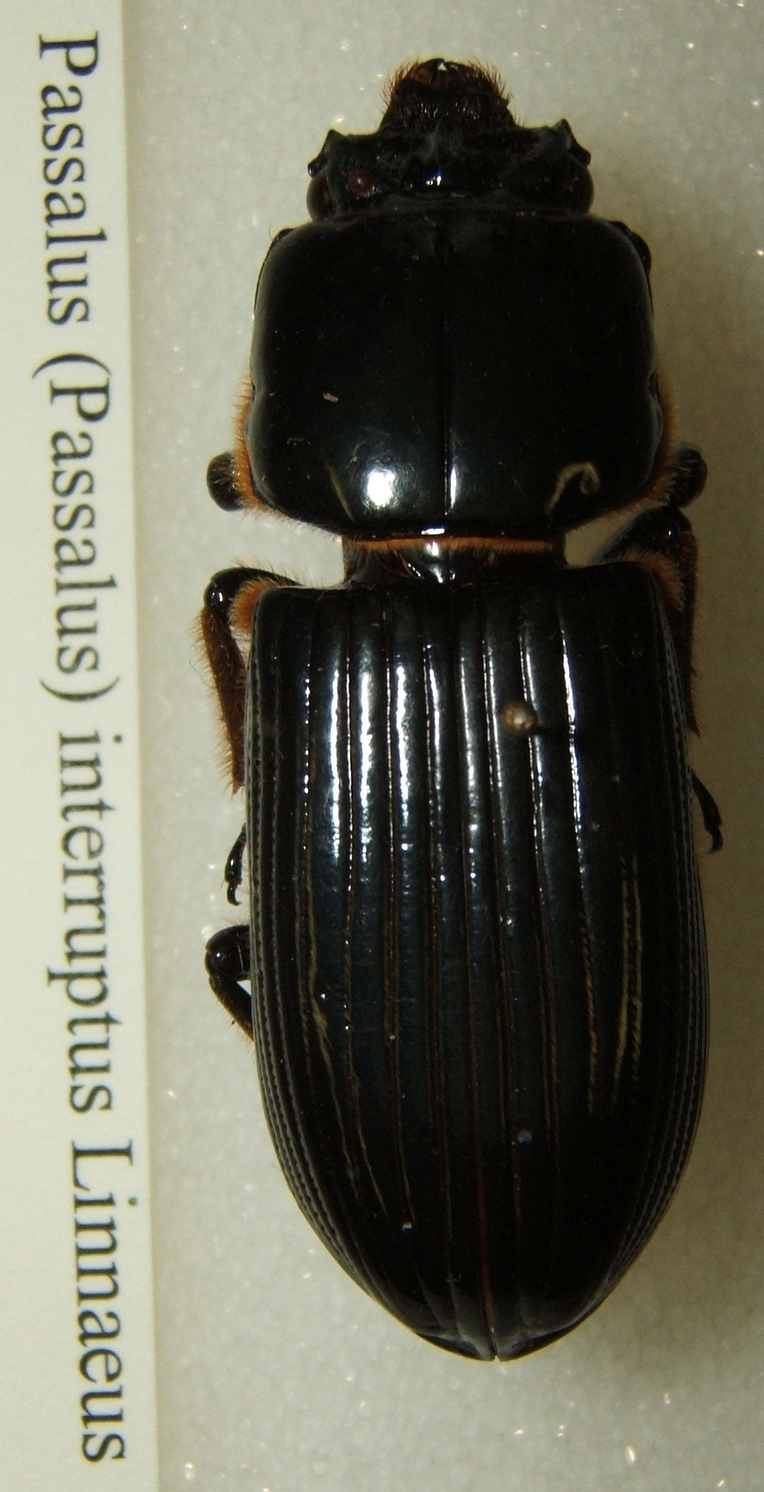
- Passalus interruptus, adult

Scientific classification
- Kingdom: Animalia
- Phylum: Arthropoda
- Class: Insecta
- Order: Coleoptera
- Suborder: Polyphaga
- Infraorder: Scarabaeiformia
- Family: Passalidae
- Genus: Passalus
- Species: P. interruptus

Binomial name
- Passalus interruptus (Linnaeus, 1758)

= Passalus interruptus =

Species of beetle

Passalus interruptus is a beetle of the Family Passalidae.

== Description ==
Passalus interruptus can reach a length of about 35–50 millimetres (1.4–2.0 in). The females are smaller than the males. Body is elongated, almost cylindrically shaped and completely black, head has a crooked horn between the eyes and mandibles show three teeth at the extremity and one in the middle. The lower jaw is very strong. Elytra are deeply furrowed. This beetle feeds on tree sap.

== Distribution and habitat ==
This species can be found in Panama and French Guiana. It prefers mixed deciduous forests.
