= Traklosiidae =

Scientific classification
- Domain: Eukaryota
- Kingdom: Animalia
- Phylum: Nematoda
- Class: Chromadorea
- Order: Rhabditida
- Superfamily: Coronostomatoidea
- Family: Traklosiidae; Bernard & Phillips, 2015

Type genus
- Traklosia Bernard & Phillips, 2015

Genera
- Traklosia Bernard & Phillips, 2015; Triumphalisnema Kloss, 1962

Synonyms
- Robertiidae Travassos & Kloss, 1961

Family of roundworms

Traklosiidae is a family of nematodes. It is in the superfamily Coronostomatoidea.
