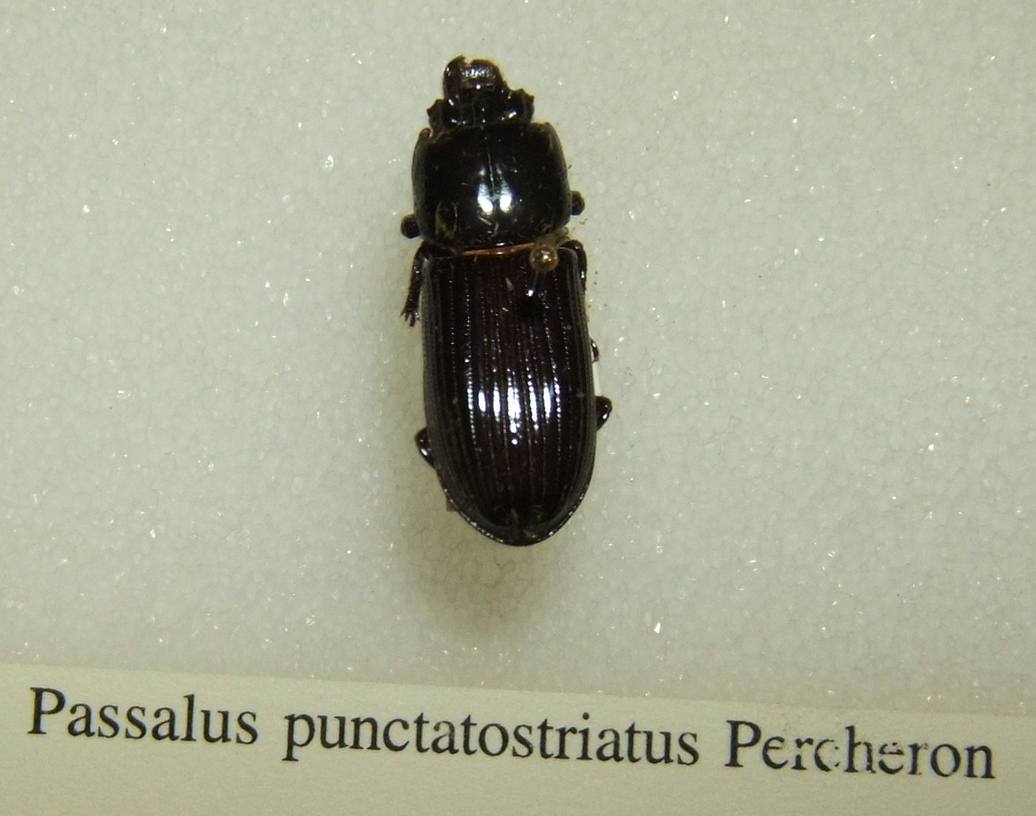
- Passalus punctatostriatus, adult

Scientific classification
- Kingdom: Animalia
- Phylum: Arthropoda
- Class: Insecta
- Order: Coleoptera
- Suborder: Polyphaga
- Infraorder: Scarabaeiformia
- Family: Passalidae
- Genus: Passalus
- Species: P. punctatostriatus

Binomial name
- Passalus punctatostriatus Percheron, 1835

= Passalus punctatostriatus =

Species of beetle

Passalus punctatostriatus is a beetle of the family Passalidae. Mating takes place within galleries of the rotten wood the species lives in.

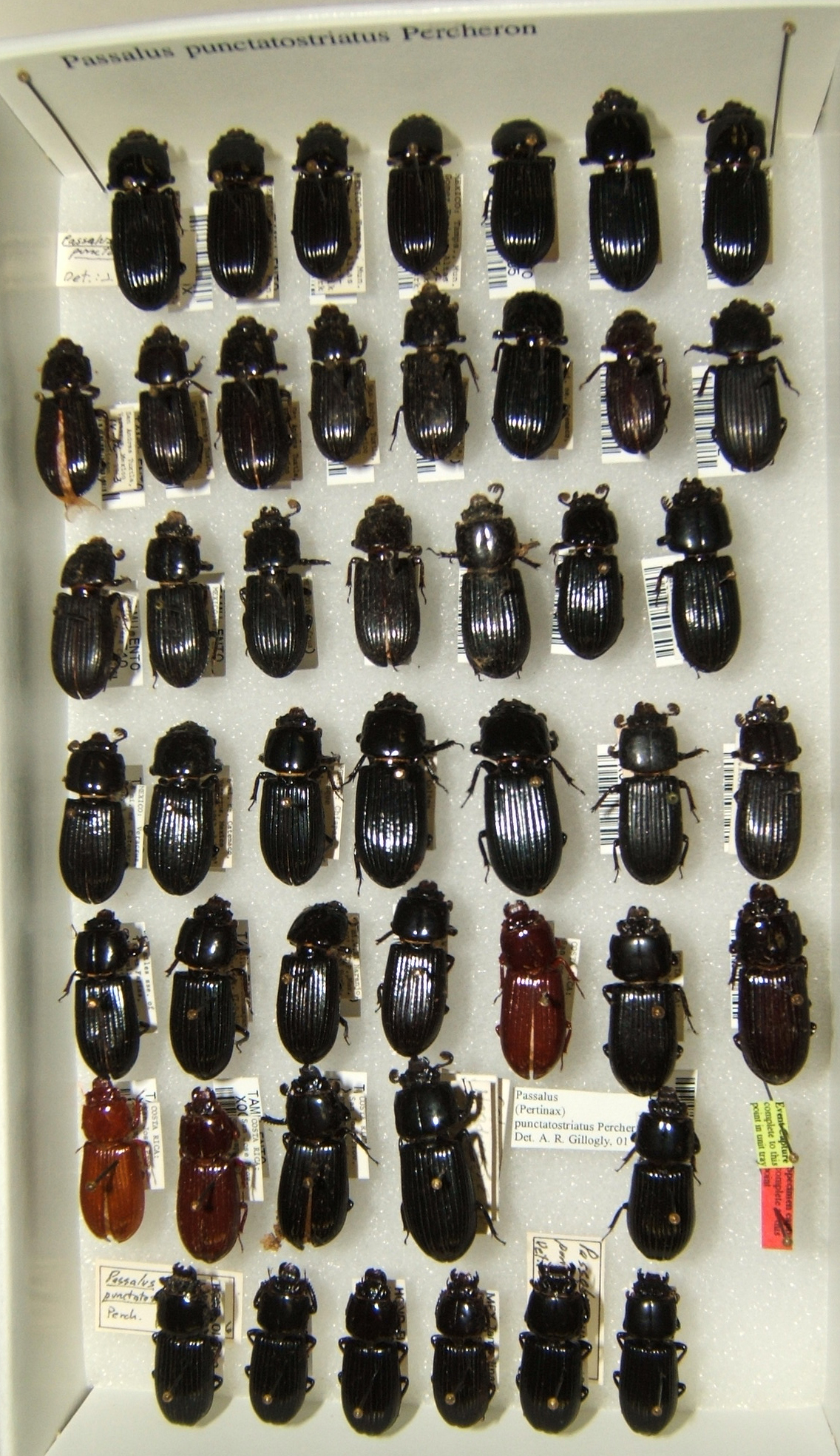
Specimen collection
