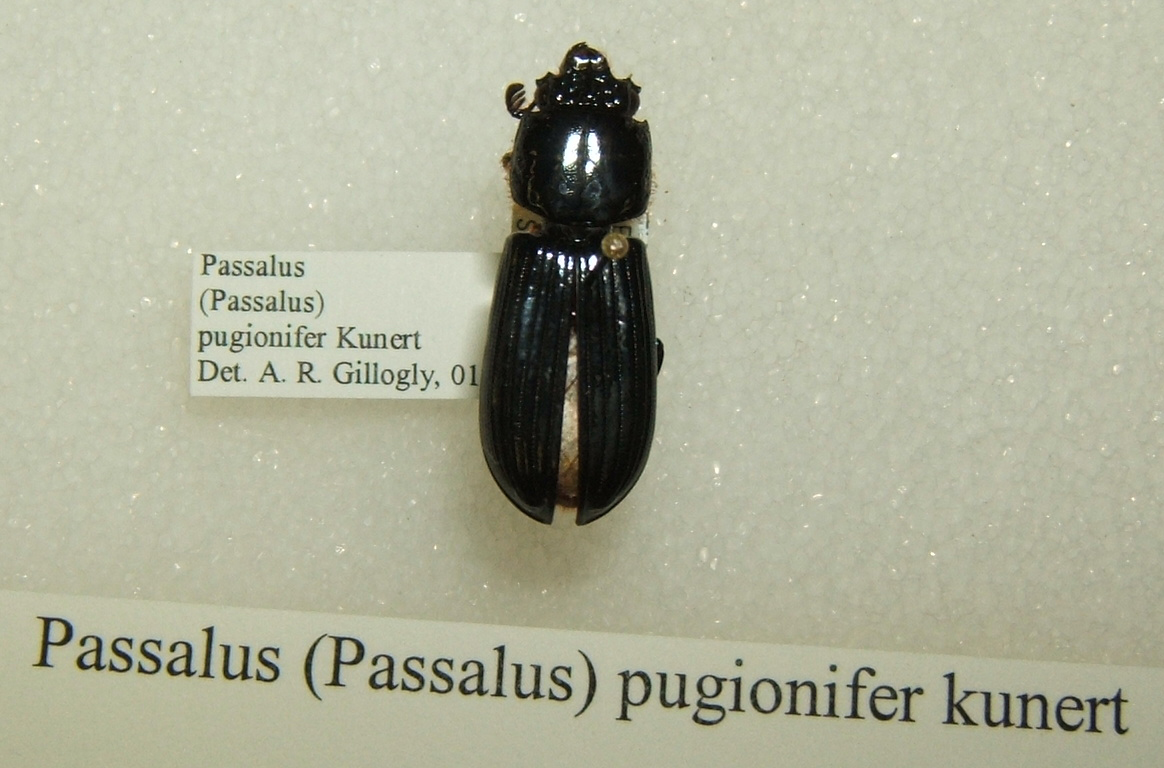
- Passalus pugionifer, adult

Scientific classification
- Kingdom: Animalia
- Phylum: Arthropoda
- Class: Insecta
- Order: Coleoptera
- Suborder: Polyphaga
- Infraorder: Scarabaeiformia
- Family: Passalidae
- Genus: Passalus
- Species: P. pugionifer

Binomial name
- Passalus pugionifer Kuwert, 1891

= Passalus pugionifer =

Species of beetle

Passalus pugionifer is a beetle of the family Passalidae.
