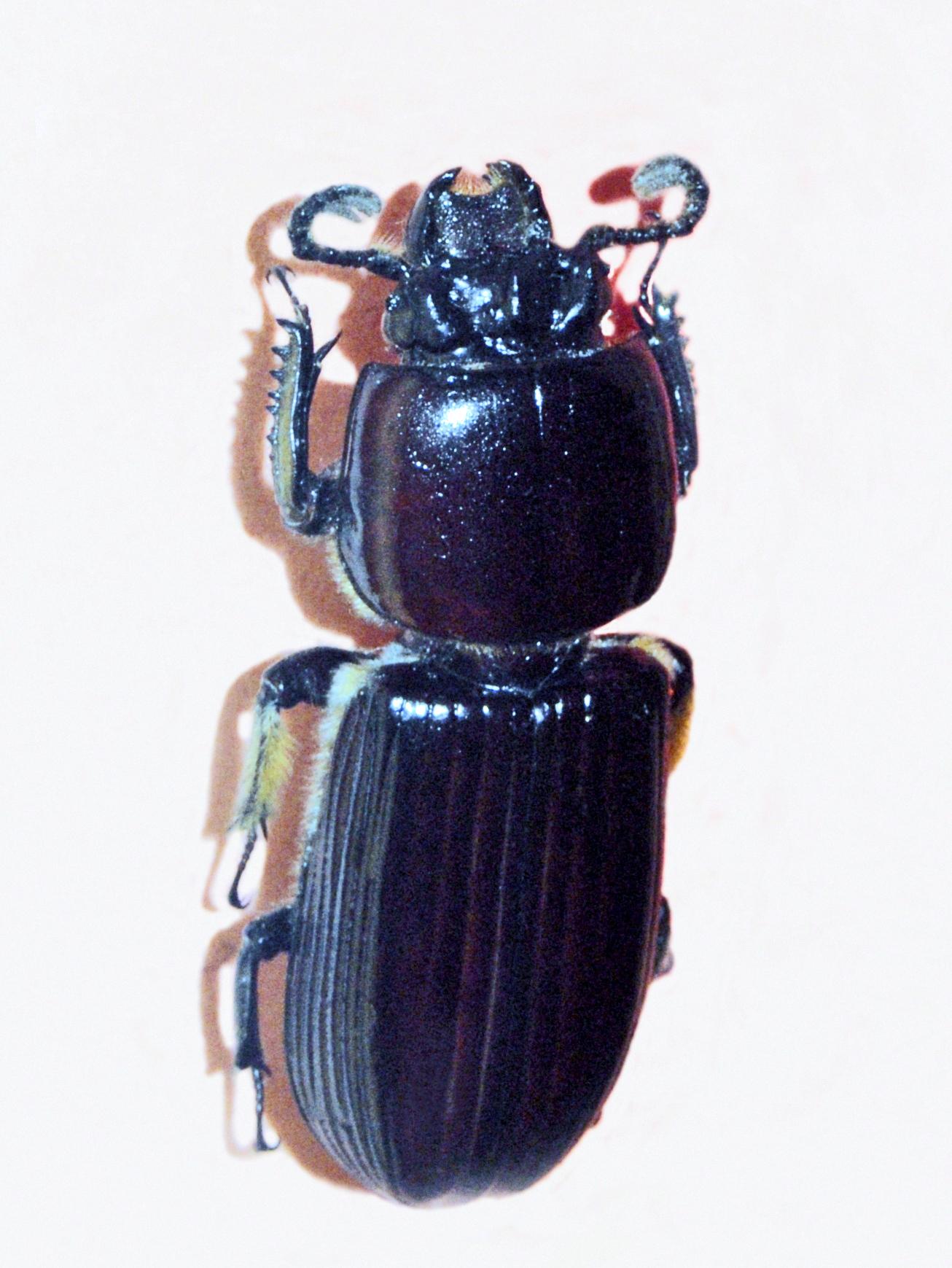
- Museum specimen of Passalus interruptus

Scientific classification
- Domain: Eukaryota
- Kingdom: Animalia
- Phylum: Arthropoda
- Class: Insecta
- Order: Coleoptera
- Suborder: Polyphaga
- Infraorder: Scarabaeiformia
- Family: Passalidae
- Genus: Passalus; Fabricius, 1792

Synonyms
- Alocerus Zang, 1905; Aponelides Kuwert, 1896; Calidas Kuwert, 1896; Cassius Kuwert, 1891; Epipertinax Kuwert, 1891; Epiphanus Kaup, 1871; Epiphoroneus Arrow, 1907; Epipleurothrix Zang, 1905; Gnomon Zang, 1905; Lasioperix Zang, 1905

= Passalus =

Genus of beetles

Passalus is a genus of beetles of the family Passalidae.

== Species ==
This list is a partial list of species

- Passalus barrus Boucher & Reyes-Castillo, 1991
- Passalus bucki Luederwaldt, 1931
- Passalus coniferus Eschscholtz, 1829
- Passalus convexus Dalman, 1817
- Passalus elfriedae Luederwaldt, 1931
- Passalus epiphanoides (Kuwert, 1891)
- Passalus glaberrimus Eschscholtz, 1829
- Passalus interruptus (Linneo, 1758)
- Passalus interstitialis Eschscholtz, 1829
- Passalus pugionifer (Kuwert, 1891)
- Passalus punctatostriatus Percheron, 1835
- Passalus punctiger LePeletier & Serville, 1825
- Passalus rhodocanthopoides (Kuwert, 1891)
- Passalus variiphyllus (Kuwert, 1891)
