= Traklosia =

Scientific classification
- Domain: Eukaryota
- Kingdom: Animalia
- Phylum: Nematoda
- Class: Chromadorea
- Order: Rhabditida
- Family: Traklosiidae
- Genus: Traklosia; Bernard & Phillips, 2015

Type species
- Robertia leiperi Travassos & Kloss, 1961

Species
- T. cubana (Spiridonov, 1984); T. leiperi (Travassos & Kloss, 1961); T. longicauda (Garcia et al., 1995)

Synonyms
- Robertia Travassos & Kloss, 1961 nec Boonstra, 1948

Genus of roundworms

Traklosia is a genus of nematodes. The genus was originally circumscribed in 1961 under the deprecated name Robertia. It consists of three species found in Brazil and Cuba, and they are parasites of millipedes.

== Taxonomic history ==
In 2015, Ernest C. Bernard and Gary Phillips coined Traklosia as nomen novum for Robertia. The word Traklosia comes from the first three letters in the surnames of L. Travassos and G. R. Kloss. Travassos and Kloss had circumscribed the genus Robertia for their newly-described species Robertia leiperi in 1961. The generic name Robertia was unavailable because a senior homonym, the synapsid genus Robertia, was named in 1948.

Traklosia is the type genus of the family Traklosiidae, which was changed from Robertiidae. The genus Triumphalisnema is in the same family. Travassos and Kloss initially placed their genus Robertia in a new subfamily Robertiinae in the family Thelastomatidae. George Poinar Jr. recognized Robertiidae as its own family in 1977. In 1989, Adamson synonymized Robertiidae with Thelastomatidae. The family Traklosiidae is thought to be valid according to Gary Phillips and colleagues.

=== Species ===
As of 2015, three species are recognized in the genus Traklosia. All of them were initially described with the generic name Robertia. The three species are: T. cubana, T. leiperi, and T. longicauda. The type species is T. leiperi, under its original combination Robertia leiperi. T. cubana was described in 1984 by S. E. Spiridonov of the USSR Academy of Science. T. leiperi was described in 1961 by L. Travassos and G. R. Kloss of the Oswaldo Cruz Institute. T. longicauda was described in 1995 by Nayla García, Alberto Coy, and Marianela Álvarez, all parasitologists at the Cuban Academy of Sciences.

== Diagnosis and description ==
Females in this genus are very small. The female reproductive system has only one genital tract. Their uteri are parallel and oriented to their posterior. They bear a single egg at a time, and eggs are ovalish. Their vagina points anteriorly and is in the posterior third of their body (excluding the tail). Males have a caudal extremity which suddenly narrows half-way making its end thread-like. Their genital cone is well developed.

== Distribution ==
Traklosia is found in South America and the West Indies. T. cubana and T. longicauda are both found in Cuba: T. cubana has been recorded in Guantánamo along the Carretera Central between Imías and Baracoa, and T. longicauda has been recorded in the National Botanical Garden in Havana. T. leiperi has been recorded in the Brazilian state of Rio de Janeiro.

== Hosts ==
Traklosia species infect hosts in the orders Coleoptera and Diplopoda. T. cubana and T. longicauda have both been found in the millipede genus Rhinocricus: T. cubana has been found in an unspecified Rhinocricus species and T. longicauda has been found in R. duvernoyi. T. leiperi has been found in the millipede species Eurydesmus ruidus.
