= Coronostomatoidea =

Scientific classification
- Domain: Eukaryota
- Kingdom: Animalia
- Phylum: Nematoda
- Class: Chromadorea
- Order: Rhabditida
- Infraorder: Oxyuridomorpha
- Superfamily: Coronostomatoidea; Kloss, 1961

Superfamily of roundworms

Coronostomatoidea is a superfamily of nematodes. Its type family is Coronostomatidae, which was circumscribed in 1961 by G. R. Kloss. The superfamily was initially circumscribed in 1977 by George Poinar Jr. and then re-established in 2016 by Gary Phillips and colleagues. This superfamily consists of the families Coronostomatidae and Traklosiidae.
