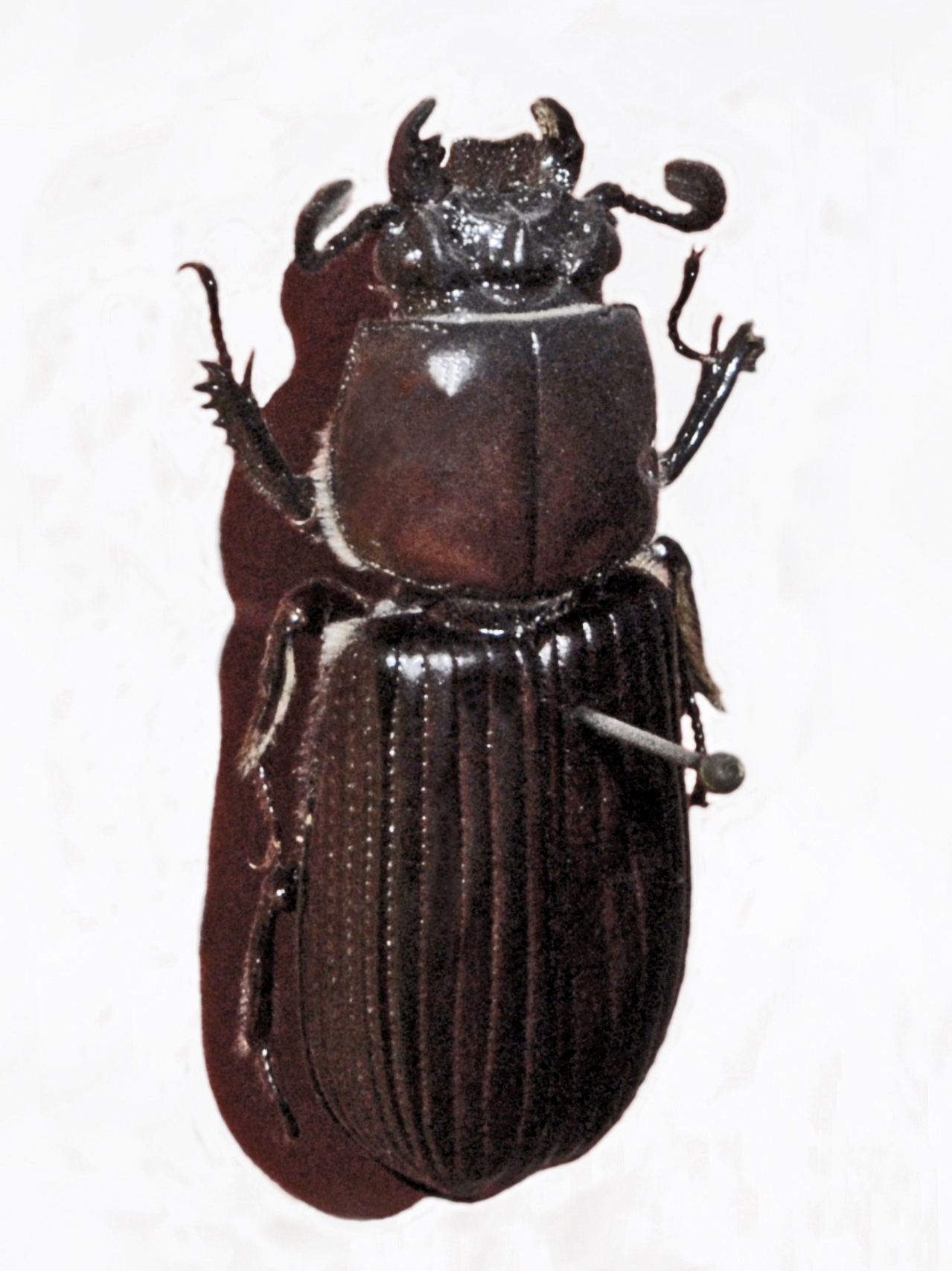
- Passalus punctiger. Mounted specimen on display at the Museo Civico di Storia Naturale di Milano

Scientific classification
- Kingdom: Animalia
- Phylum: Arthropoda
- Class: Insecta
- Order: Coleoptera
- Suborder: Polyphaga
- Infraorder: Scarabaeiformia
- Family: Passalidae
- Genus: Passalus
- Species: P. punctiger

Binomial name
- Passalus punctiger Lepeletier & Audinet-Serville, 1825

Synonyms
- Neleus acarinatus Kuwert, 1898; Neleus aequatoris Kuwert, 1898; Neleus altidens Kuwert, 1898; Neleus approximatidentatus Kuwert, 1898; Neleus arcuatotaeniatus Kuwert, 1898; Neleus argentinus Kuwert, 1898; Neleus arrogans Kuwert, 1898; Neleus boliviensis Kuwert, 1898; Neleus carinaefrons Kuwert, 1898; Neleus chilensis Kuwert, 1891

= Passalus punctiger =

Species of beetle

Passalus punctiger is a beetle of the family Passalidae.

== Description ==
Passalus punctiger can reach a length of about 34 millimetres (1.3 in). Body is flattened and completely black, with yellowish hairs on elytral shoulders and anterior sides. Elytra show deep grooves and a strong punctation. Antennae have long lamellae.

== Distribution and habitat ==
This species occurs in Arizona, Mexico and in Central and Southern America up to Paraguay and Argentina. It also is present on the Galapagos Islands. It can be found in humid forest areas at an elevation of 0–1,500 metres (0–4,921 ft) above sea level.

== Life cycle ==
These beetles live under and inside rotten logs. Females lay eggs are in tunnels into the wood. This species has one brood or generation per year (univoltine).

== Gallery ==
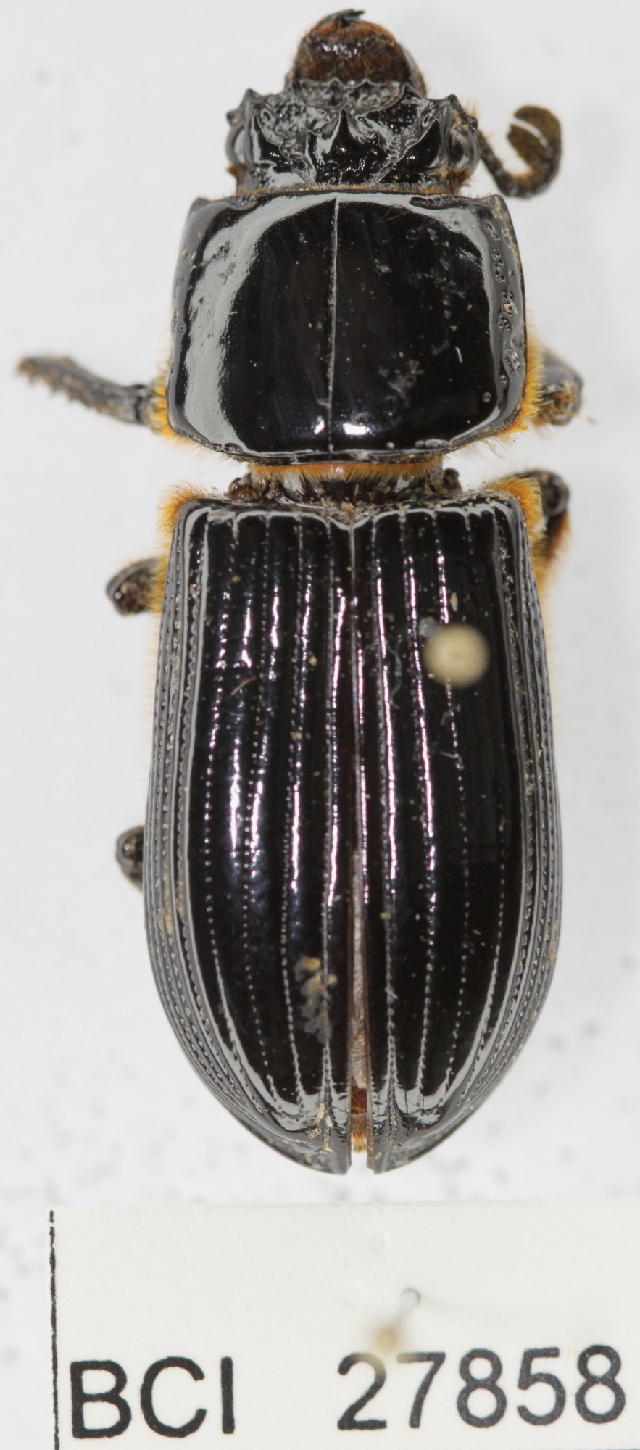
Passalus punctiger

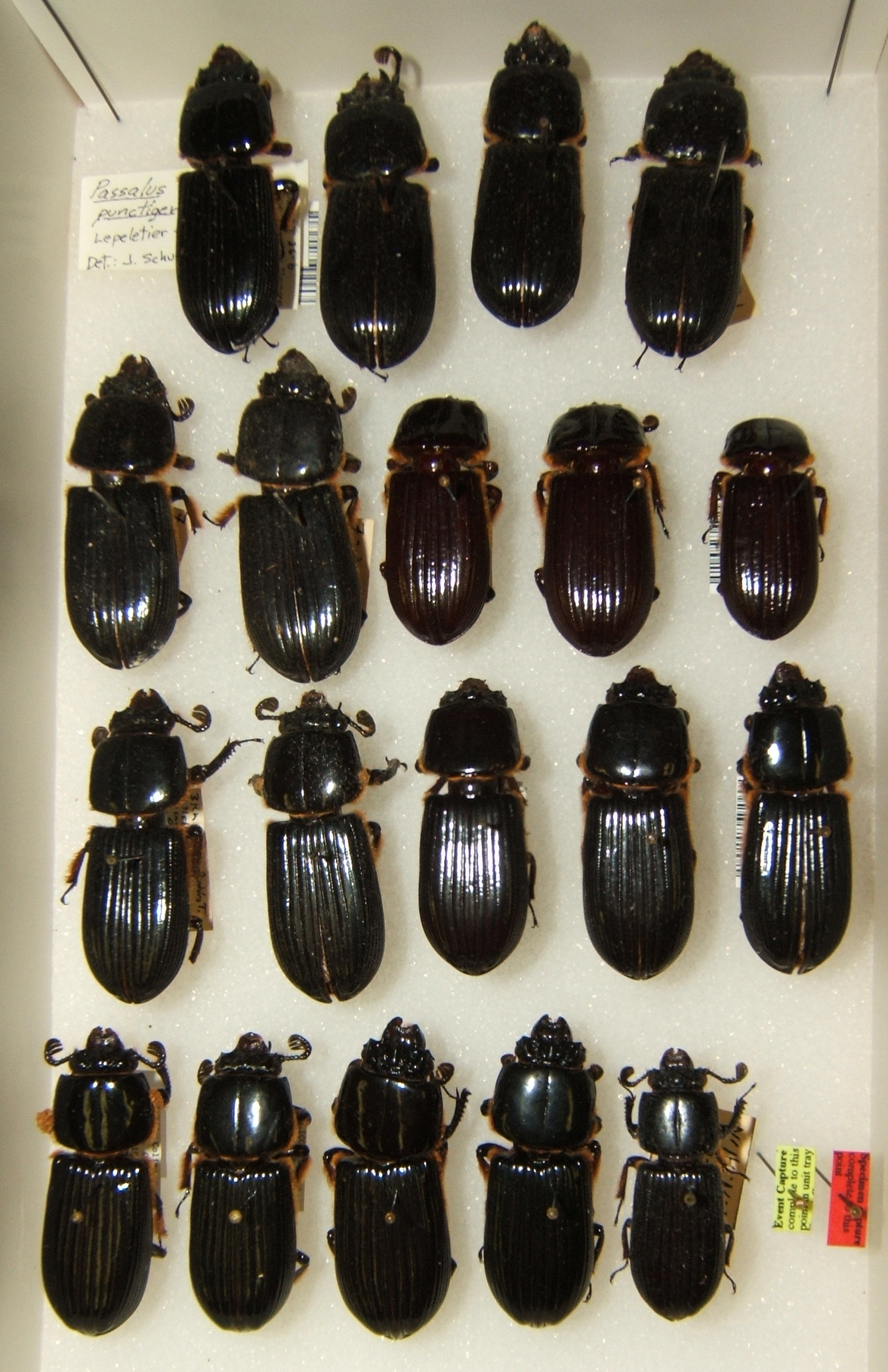
Adult variation
