= Hystrignathidae =

Scientific classification
- Domain: Eukaryota
- Kingdom: Animalia
- Phylum: Nematoda
- Class: Chromadorea
- Order: Rhabditida
- Family: Hystrignathidae

Family of roundworms

Hystrignathidae is a family of nematodes belonging to the order Rhabditida.

Genera:

- Anomalostoma Cordeira, 1981
- Anuronema Clark, 1978
- Artigasia Christie, 1934
- Basirella Biswas & Chakravarty, 1963
- Batwanema Morffe & García, 2013
- Boraceianema Travassos & Kloss, 1958
- Buzionema Kloss, 1966
- Carlosia Travassos & Kloss, 1957
- Chokwenema Morffe & García, 2013
- Christiella Travassos & Kloss, 1957
- Coronocephalus Cordeira, 1981
- Coynema Morffe & García, 2011
- Glaber Travassos & Kloss, 1958
- Hystrignathus Leidy, 1850
- Hystrignatus
- Jibacoa Coy-Otero, Garcia & Alvarez, 1993
- Klossiella Cordeira, 1981
- Klossnema Cordeira, 1981
- Kongonema Morffe & García, 2013
- Lauronema Almeida, 1938
- Lepidonema Cobb, 1898
- Longior Travassos & Kloss, 1958
- Lubanema Morffe & García, 2013
- Mentecle Travassos & Kloss, 1958
- Papillabrum Kloss, 1962
- Passalidophila Van Waerebeke, 1973
- Phalacronema Clark, 1978
- Salesia Travassos & Kloss, 1958
- Soaresnema Travassos & Kloss, 1958
- Sprentia Clark, 1978
- Triumphalisnema Kloss, 1962
- Urbanonema Travassos & Kloss, 1958
- Ventelia Travassos & Kloss, 1958
- Vulcanonema Travassos & Kloss, 1958
