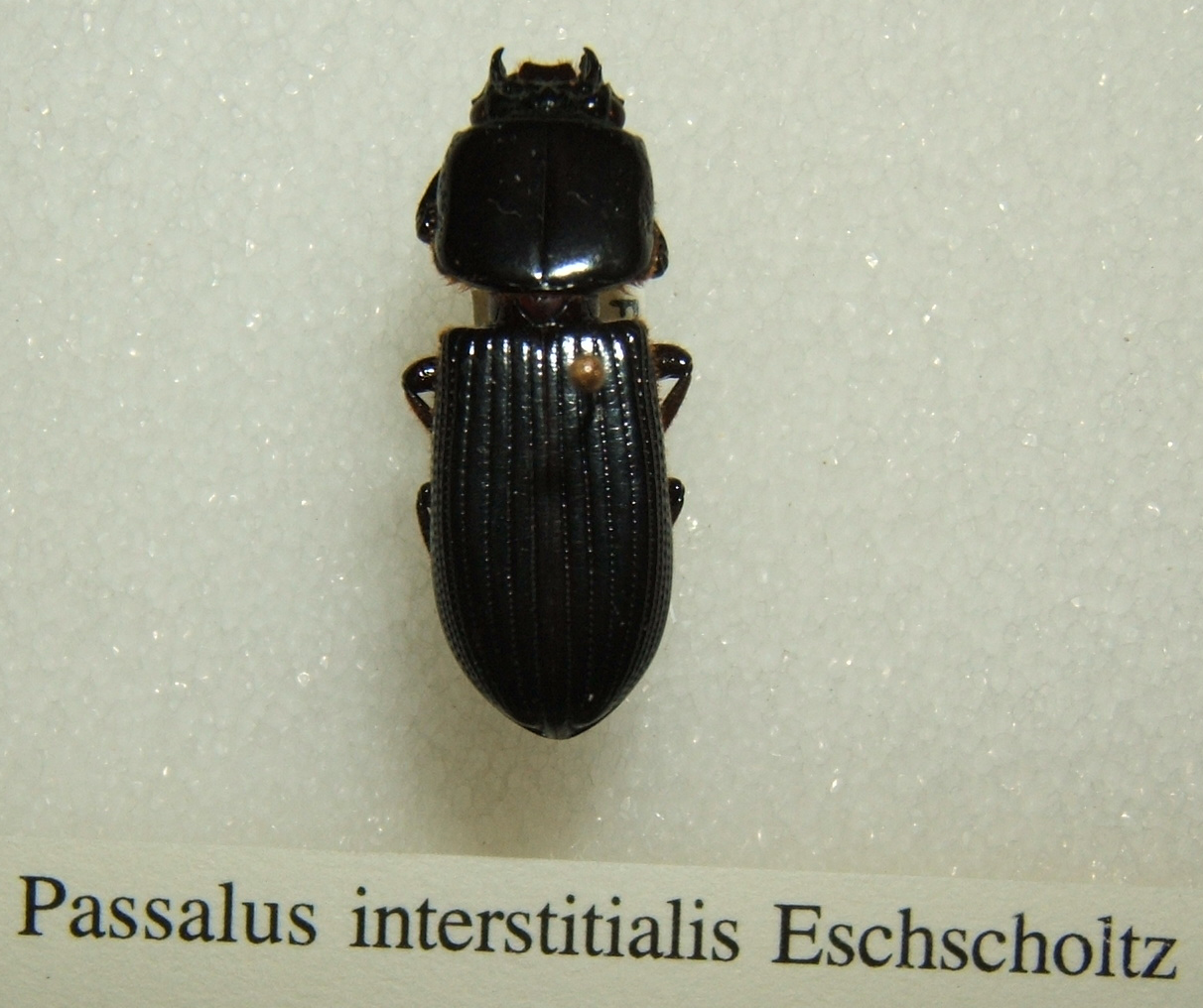
- Passalus interstitialis, adult

Scientific classification
- Kingdom: Animalia
- Phylum: Arthropoda
- Class: Insecta
- Order: Coleoptera
- Suborder: Polyphaga
- Infraorder: Scarabaeiformia
- Family: Passalidae
- Genus: Passalus
- Species: P. interstitialis

Binomial name
- Passalus interstitialis Eschsholtz

= Passalus interstitialis =

Species of beetle

Passalus interstitialis is a beetle of the family Passalidae, distributed from Mexico to Argentina and in the West Indies.

It was classified by Johann Friedrich von Eschscholtz in the early 19th century.

== Gallery ==
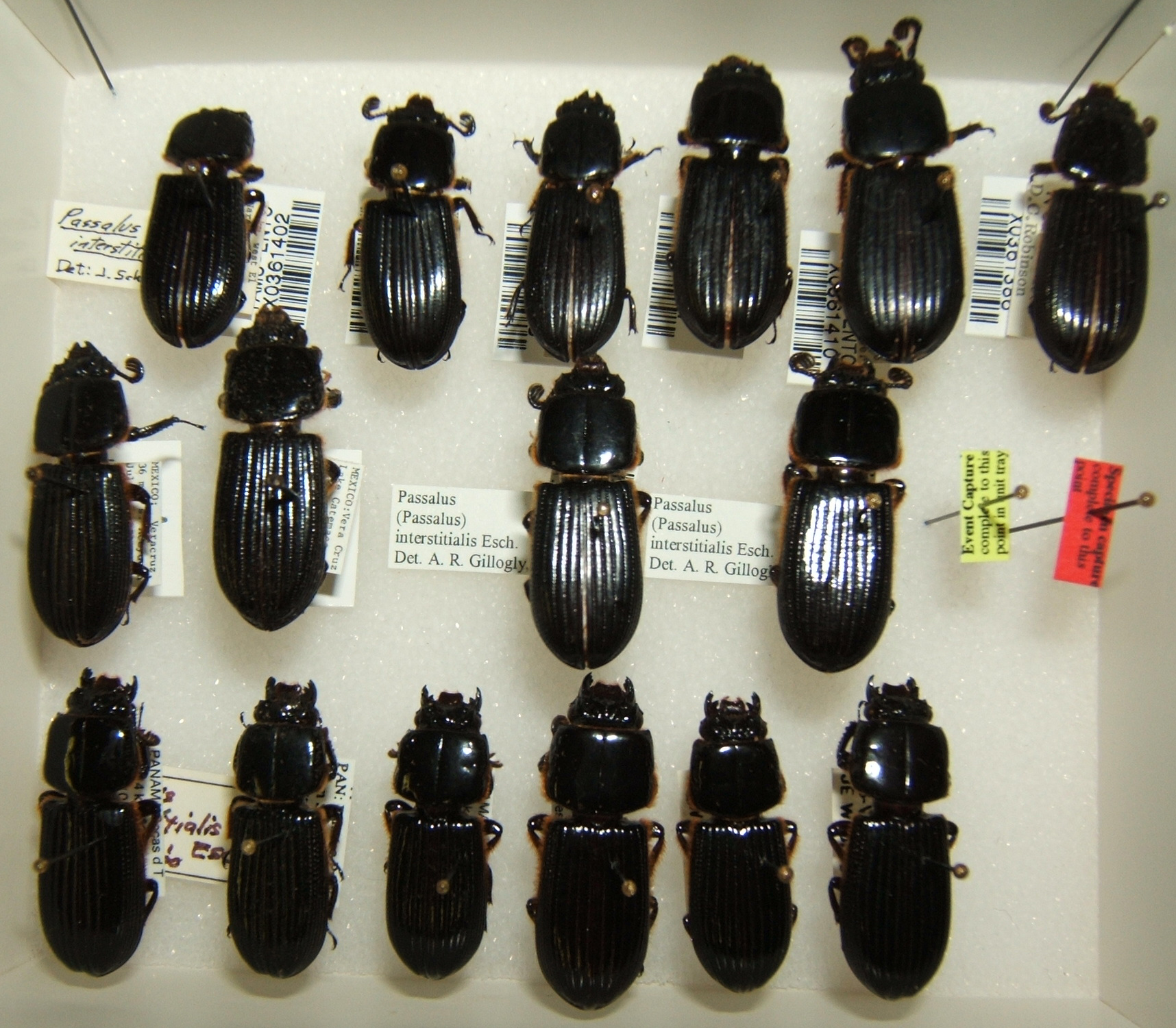
Specimen collection
