= Triumphalisnema =

Scientific classification
- Kingdom: Animalia
- Phylum: Nematoda
- Class: Chromadorea
- Order: Rhabditida
- Family: Traklosiidae
- Genus: Triumphalisnema; Kloss, 1962

Genus of roundworms

Triumphalisnema is a genus of nematodes belonging to the family Traklosiidae.

Species:

- Triumphalisnema acaudata Guerrero, 1981
- Triumphalisnema bialulaundatum Hunt, Sutherland & Machon, 1990
- Triumphalisnema lenkoi Kloss, 1962
