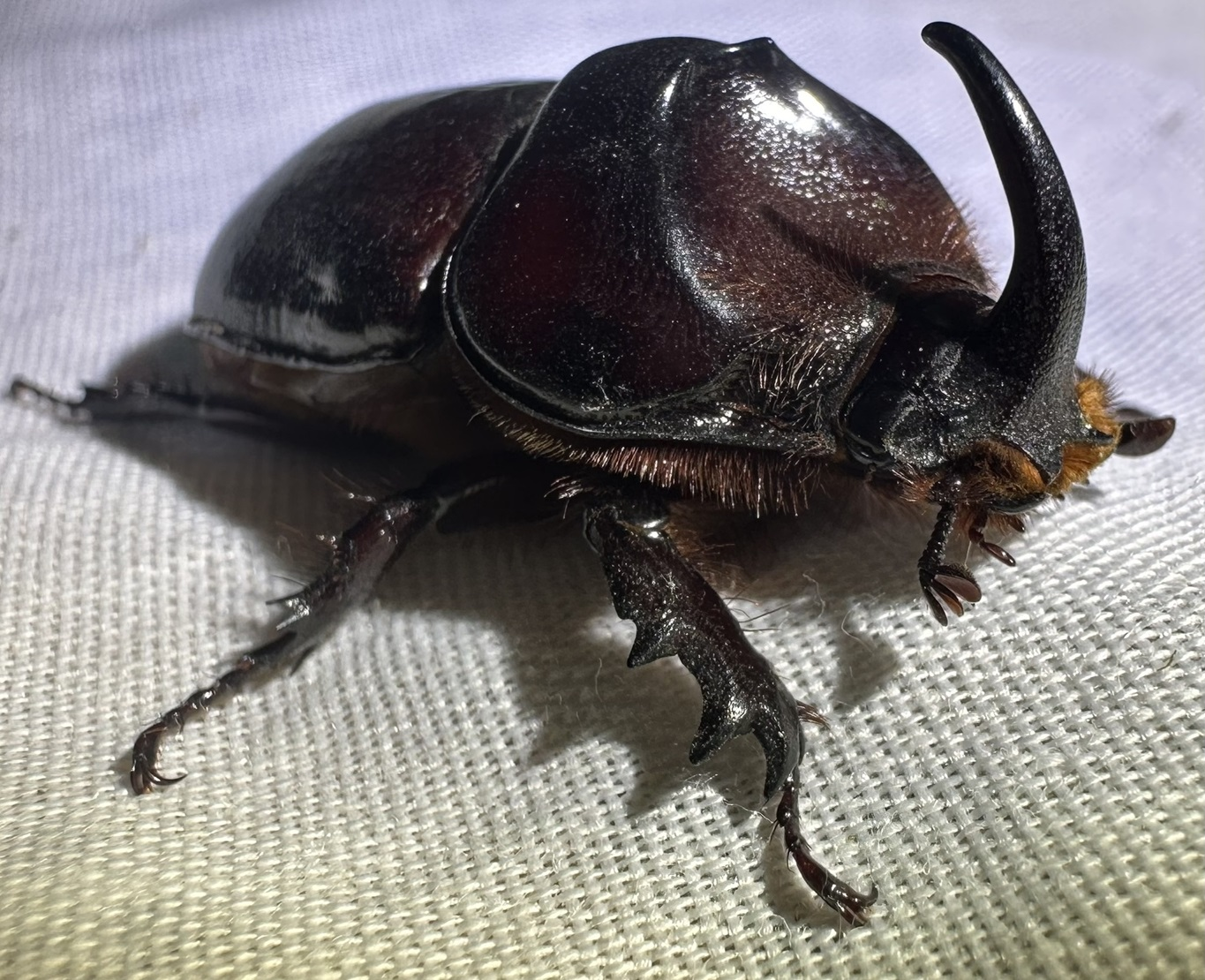
- male
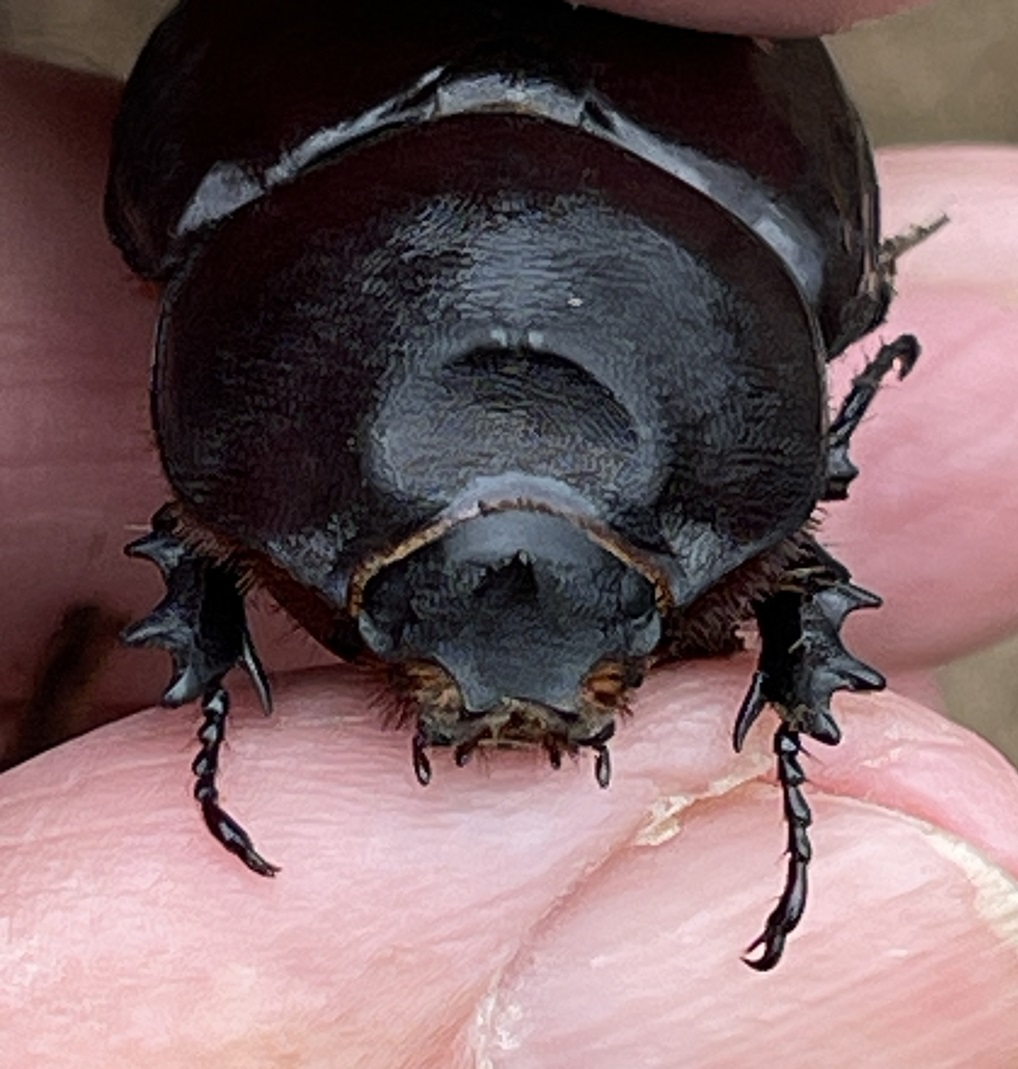
- female

Scientific classification
- Kingdom: Animalia
- Phylum: Arthropoda
- Clade: Pancrustacea
- Class: Insecta
- Order: Coleoptera
- Suborder: Polyphaga
- Infraorder: Scarabaeiformia
- Family: Scarabaeidae
- Subfamily: Dynastinae
- Tribe: Oryctini
- Genus: Oryctes
- Species: O. boas

Binomial name
- Oryctes boas (Fabricius, 1775)

Synonyms
- Scarabaeus boas Fabricius, 1775; Geotrupes boas (Fabricius, 1775); Geotrupes ferrugineus Thunberg, 1818; Oryctes senegalensis Klug, 1835

= Oryctes boas =

Species of beetle

Oryctes boas is a species of rhinoceros beetles from the subfamily Dynastinae (family: Scarabaeidae) which is found in many parts of sub-Saharan Africa and in some neighboring parts of the Near East. It appears to be most common in south-eastern Africa. O. boas breeds mainly in compost heaps and is a pest of coconut palms. However, in West Africa it is usually less abundant and less destructive on coconut palms compared to Oryctes monoceros, a species with a similar distribution range and biology. Both species belong to the subgenus Rykanoryctes which is characterized by having 3 fixed (immovable) spikes at the tip of the hind tibia. The main morphological difference between both species is the size of the horn. In O. boas males, the horn is very long and curved backwards at the tip. O. boas is also smaller and heavier built compared to O. monoceros. The pronotum of O. boas males has a large depression (concavity) with two pointed teeth at its hind margin and dense hair in the anterior part. Females have a short horn and the depression on the pronotum is very small, round and usually with two knobs at the hind margin.

== Taxonomy ==
Oryctes boas was originally described by Fabricius as Scarabaeus boas in 1775, but in 1798 he transferred it to the genus Geotrupes, around the same time as the genus Oryctes was established and described. The genus Geotrupes had been created a year earlier by Latreille. However, the description provided in 1798 by Fabricius for Geotrupes did not match the definition by Latreille and subsequent authors studying this group of beetles have placed the species boas in the genus Oryctes instead. These authors include Castelnau and Burmeister who listed 11 and 21 species respectively under Oryctes, in both cases including the species Oryctes boas. Two other names have been established for Oryctes species which are now regarded as synonyms of Oryctes boas. These are Geotrupes ferrugineus and Oryctes senegalensis, described in 1818 and 1835 respectively.

Two atypical morphological forms of Oryctes boas have been described which are now listed as subspecies. The form progressiva was described as an aberration which is characterized by a small tooth or hump on the inside of the horn. The tooth is usually located not far from the middle between base and tip of the horn and is directed backwards. This form has been found in a number of specimens from several countries in eastern Africa (Erithrea, Tanzania and Natal region in South Africa). It seems to occur together with the normal from. In addition, Oryctes boas var. unituberculata was described from a single female found in Uganda which has only one hump at the hind margin of the depression (concavity) of the pronotum. Oryctes boas females usually have two such humps, see below.

== Distribution ==
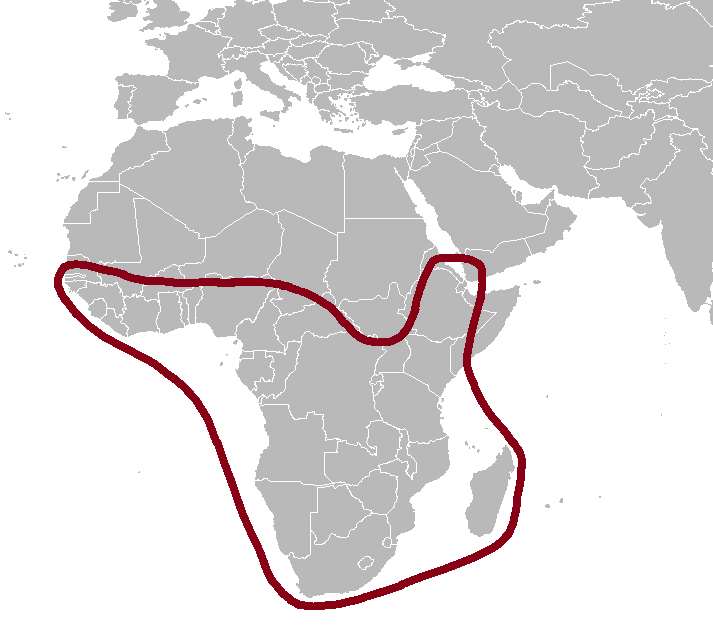
Distribution range of Oryctes boas

Fabricius gave the type locality for Oryctes boas as Sierra Leone. The synonym species Geotrupes ferrugineus and Oryctes senegalensis have been described from South Africa and Senegal respectively, judging from the title of the description and the species name senegalensis. In his taxonomic review of Oryctes species, Sebö Endrödi provided the locations of > 700 specimens of O. boas which he had found in various museums and collections and which he had examined taxonomically. They were from 27 countries in sub-Saharan Africa: Angola, Benin, Burundi, Cameroon, Chad, DR Congo, Eritrea, Ethiopia, Ghana, Guinea, Guinea-Bissau, Ivory coast, Kenya, Lesotho, Liberia, Madagascar, Namibia, Niger, Nigeria, Rwanda, Senegal, South Africa, "Sudan" (with the location 'Mossi', apparently referring to Mossi Kingdoms = Burkina Faso, previously part of French Sudan), Uganda, Tanzania, Togo and Zimbabwe, as well as from Yemen in the Near East. These and other records show that O. boas can be found in almost all parts of sub-Saharan Africa and that it has been most often recorded in south-eastern parts, from Tanzania to eastern South Africa as well as in Madagascar. While Oryctes boas has not been established outside its native range in Africa, it has been regarded as being of quarantine concern and having an invasive potential in China.

== Description ==
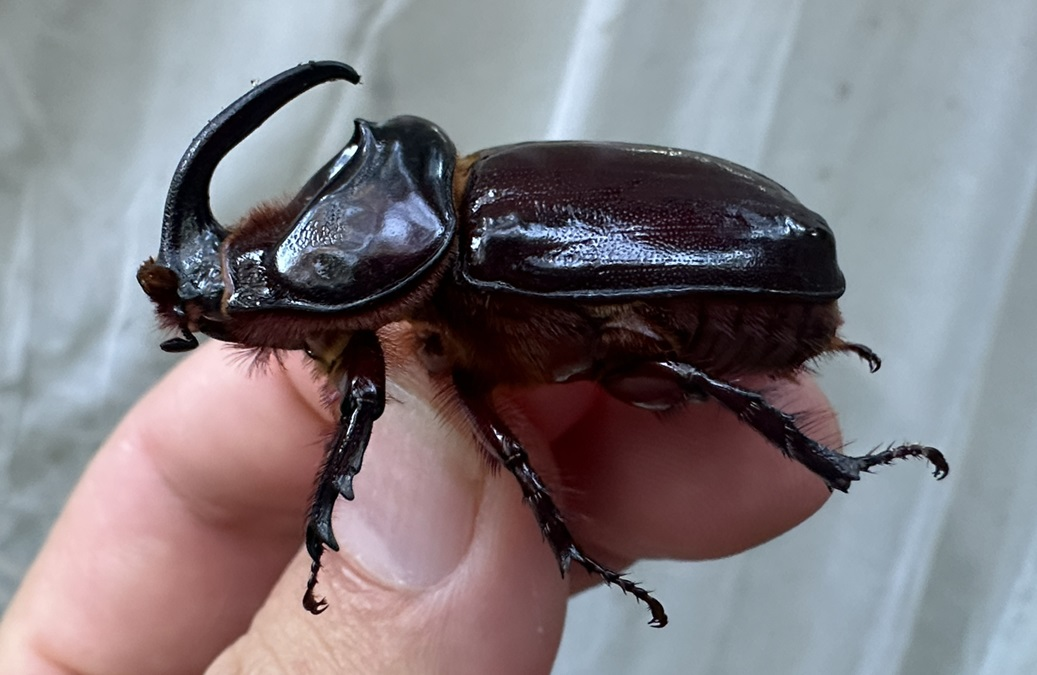
Oryctes boas male in side view

Compared to other species of Oryctes, Oryctes boas is of small to medium size. Adults are typically between 30 and 40 mm long and Sebö Endrödi gives a range of 27–46 mm for 711 examined specimens. The adults are glossy and have a dark reddish brown coloration. Males have a very long horn and the morphology of the pronotum is characteristic. The tip of the horn is curved backwards. The middle of the horn may be slightly thickened and in eastern Africa, it occasionally bears a small tooth on its inside, pointing backwards.

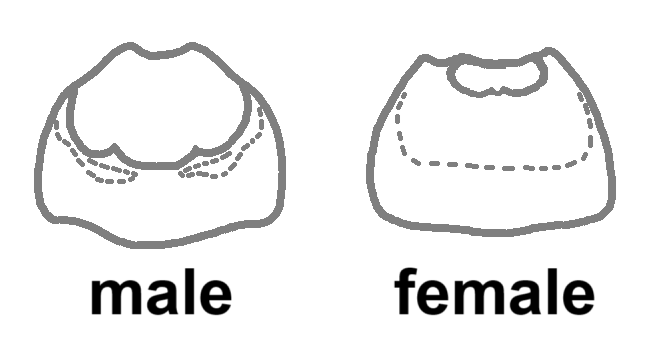
Pronotum of Oryctes boas male (left) and female (right). In females the depression on the pronotum is much smaller and circular. The pointed teeth at the hind margin of the depression are larger in males and widely separated.

The pronotum of males has a very large depression (concavity) with two pointed teeth at its hind margin which are well separated. The anterior part of the pronotum, next to the head, is covered with long, dense hair. Females have a very short horn and the depression on the pronotum is small and round, usually with two knobs at the hind margin located close together. The clypeus is broad with a deep indentation, its outer corners are pointed. The elytra are longer than their combined width, at a ratio of about 27:21.5. The surface of the elytra has pits which are more numerous and deeper in males compared to females.

Oryctes boas, like Oryctes monoceros, is rather common in Africa. Both species have a similar distribution range and are pests of coconut palms. Males of both species can be easily distinguished by their horn which is much longer in O. boas than in O. monoceros. On average, O. boas is also smaller than O. monoceros and more solidly built.

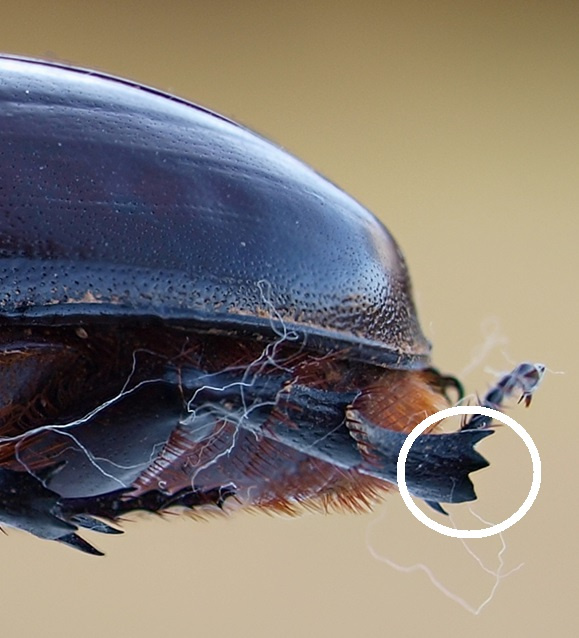
Posterior part of Oryctes boas female. The 3 fixed, immovable spikes on the hind tibia are highlighted by a white circle

Oryctes boas and O.monoceros both belongs to the subgenus Rykanoryctes which is characterized by the tip of the hind tibiae having three fixed (immovable) spikes.

== Biology and life cycle ==
Like several other species of Oryctes, Oryctes boas has been reported as a pest of coconut palms. It bores from an axil of a palm frond (leaf) into the centre of the palm crown, the palm heart, where the young fronds develop. The beetle feeds on the undeveloped fronds. The damage affects growth and nut production of the palm and can result in the death of the tree. Young palms are particularly vulnerable. Damage to coconut palms has been mainly reported from West Africa and some countries in eastern Africa like Tanzania. However in West Africa, O. boas is usually less abundant and less destructive compared to Oryctes monoceros, the main coconut pest. Apart from being an important pest of palm trees, Oryctes boas larvae are also a source of food in some countries.

The main breeding sites of Oryctes boas are compost heaps, where females lay eggs and the immature stages develop. As determined from laboratory rearing, the duration of the egg stage and the first larval stage is between 7 and 10 days. The second larval stage lasts around 2 weeks and the third larval stage around 11 weeks, including the prepupal stage. The pupal stage lasts again about 2 weeks, giving a total duration of the immature stages of about 18 weeks.

== Natural enemies ==
The role of natural enemies of Oryctes boas as possible biological control agents has been addressed in some studies. The Oryctes rhinoceros nudivirus (synonym Rhabdionvirus oryctes) has been found to be a valuable biocontrol agent for Oryctes rhinoceros and has been also shown to be able to infect other species of Oryctes. In laboratory studies, Oryctes boas larvae had a similar susceptibility compared to O. rhinoceros larvae, in contrast to O. monoceros larvae which were more resistant to this virus disease.

In Zanzibar, Tanzania, the assassin bug Platymeris rhadamanthus is frequently found in the leaf axils of coconut palms together with dead Oryctes adults. In cages, it readily feeds on Oryctes boas and O. monoceros beetles. Both species are serious coconut pests in Zanzibar and the bug has been described as a useful predator of these two Oryctes species.

== See also ==
- Oryctes agamemnon (Arabian rhinoceros beetle)
- Oryctes elegans (date palm fruit stalk borer)
- Oryctes monoceros (African rhinoceros beetle)
- Oryctes nasicornis (European rhinoceros beetle)
- Oryctes rhinoceros (coconut rhinoceros beetle)
