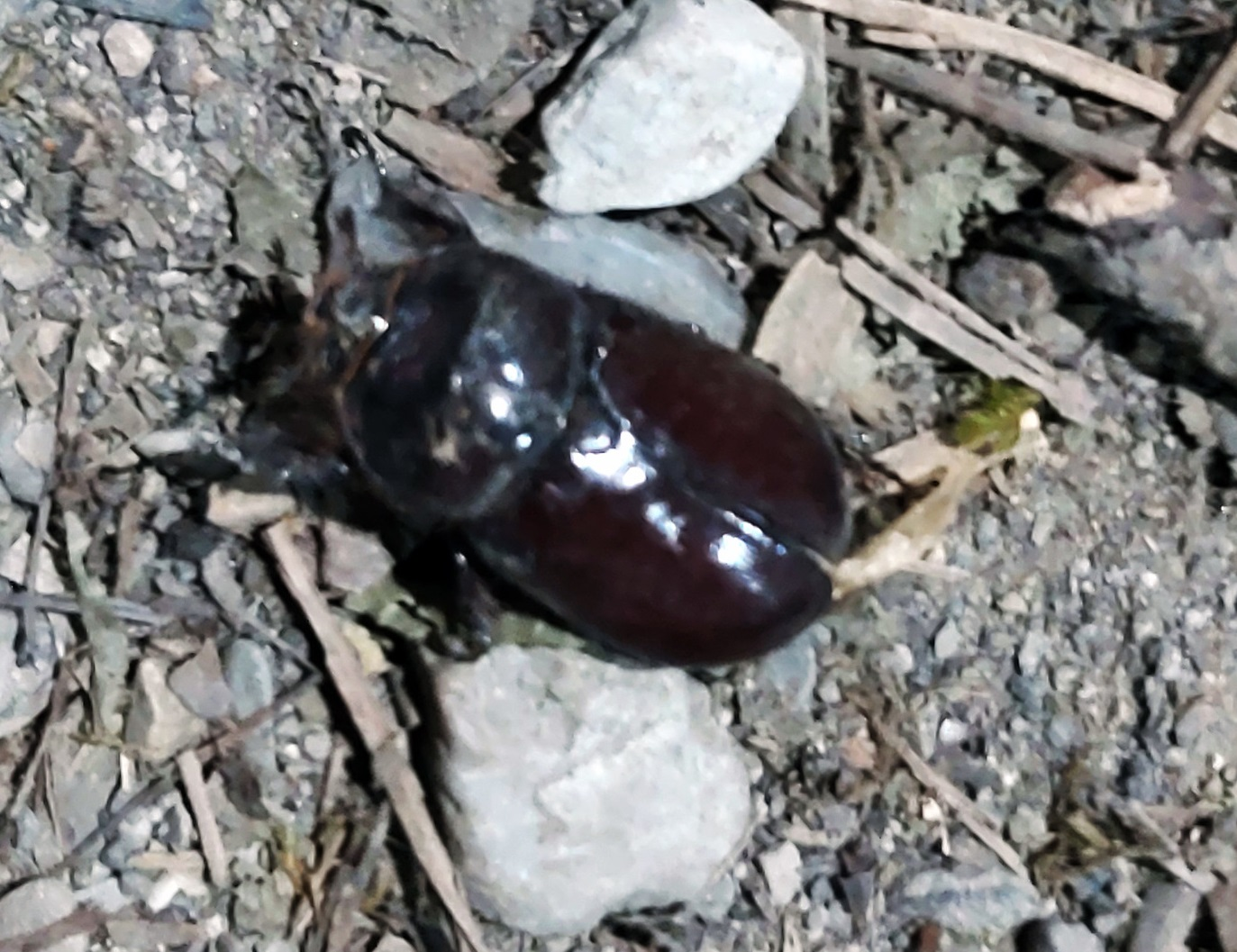
- Oryctes elegans from Iran

Scientific classification
- Kingdom: Animalia
- Phylum: Arthropoda
- Clade: Pancrustacea
- Class: Insecta
- Order: Coleoptera
- Suborder: Polyphaga
- Infraorder: Scarabaeiformia
- Family: Scarabaeidae
- Subfamily: Dynastinae
- Tribe: Oryctini
- Genus: Oryctes
- Species: O. elegans

Binomial name
- Oryctes elegans Prell, 1914

Synonyms
- Oryctes piesbergeni Bodemeyer, 1916; Oryctes sinaicus Petrovitz, 1958 (non Walker)

= Oryctes elegans =

Species of beetle

Oryctes elegans, commonly known as date palm fruit stalk borer, is a species of rhinoceros beetles from the subfamily Dynastinae (family: Scarabaeidae). It is widely distributed in the Near East, including all parts of the Arabian Peninsula, Israel, Iraq, most parts of Iran and parts of Pakistan. O. elegans is similar in morphology and biology to Oryctes agamemnon. Both species have overlapping distribution ranges, are pests of date palms and both belong to the subgenus Rykanoryctes. However, O. elegans is slightly more slender and the foretibia has a ventral, subapical and downward-pointing tooth which is missing in O. agamemnon. Oryctes species usually breed in decaying organic matter, where the larvae develop. This is also the case for the young larvae of Oryctes elegans. However, similar to O. agamemnon, the older larvae can attack the living parts of date palms like the base of the fronds (leaves), the young, soft upper parts of the trunk or the roots. Further, the adult beetles bore into the stalks of the date fruit bunches and the base of the fronds, often causing these to break off.

== Distribution ==
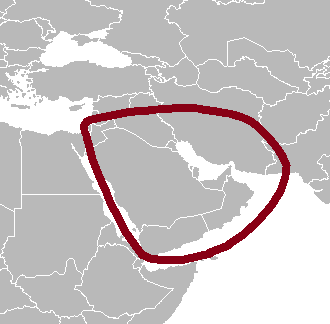
Distribution range of Oryctes elegans in the Near East

Oryctes elegans was original described from "Arabia (Fao)", apparently referring to the port city of Al-Faw at the south-eastern tip of Iraq. The type localities for O. piesbergeni and O. sinaicus Petrovitz (non Walker), both of which are regarded as synonyms of O. elegans, were given as near Bagdad and south-eastern Iran respectively. Other records indicate that O. elegans is widely distributed in Iran, Iraq, the Arabian Peninsula (Saudi Arabia, Kuwait, the UAE, Oman and Yemen) and has been also reported from Israel and from parts of Pakistan.

== Description ==
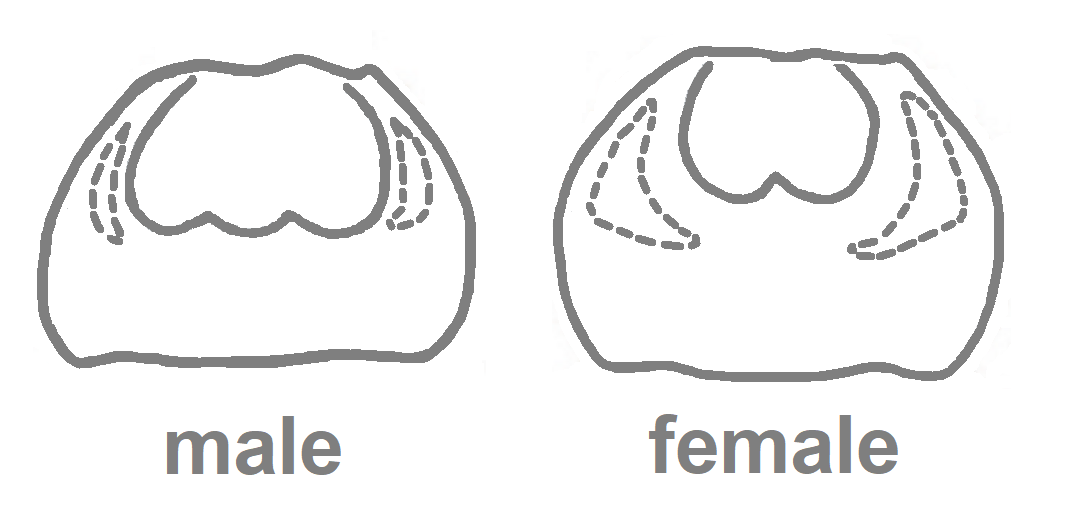
Pronotum of Oryctes elegans male (left) and female (right). In females the depression on the pronotum is smaller with only one knob at the hind margin.

Compared to other species of Oryctes, adult beetles of Oryctes elegans are of small to medium size (typically around 30–35 mm long) with a dark brown to black colour. The species belongs to the subgenus Rykanoryctes which is characterized by the end of the hind tibia having three fixed (immovable) spikes, apart from some moveable processes. It can be distinguished from other species of that subgenus by a combination of different characters, the most important one being a ventral, downward-pointing tooth before the end of the fore tibia (see illustration below). The adults have a slender appearance with the depression (concavity) on the pronotum having two knobs at its hind margin in males, but only one in females. Like in other species of Oryctes, the concavity is smaller in females than in males. It is relatively shallow and nearly circular in females. On the head, the horn is small and the clypeus is broad with a semi-circular indentation.

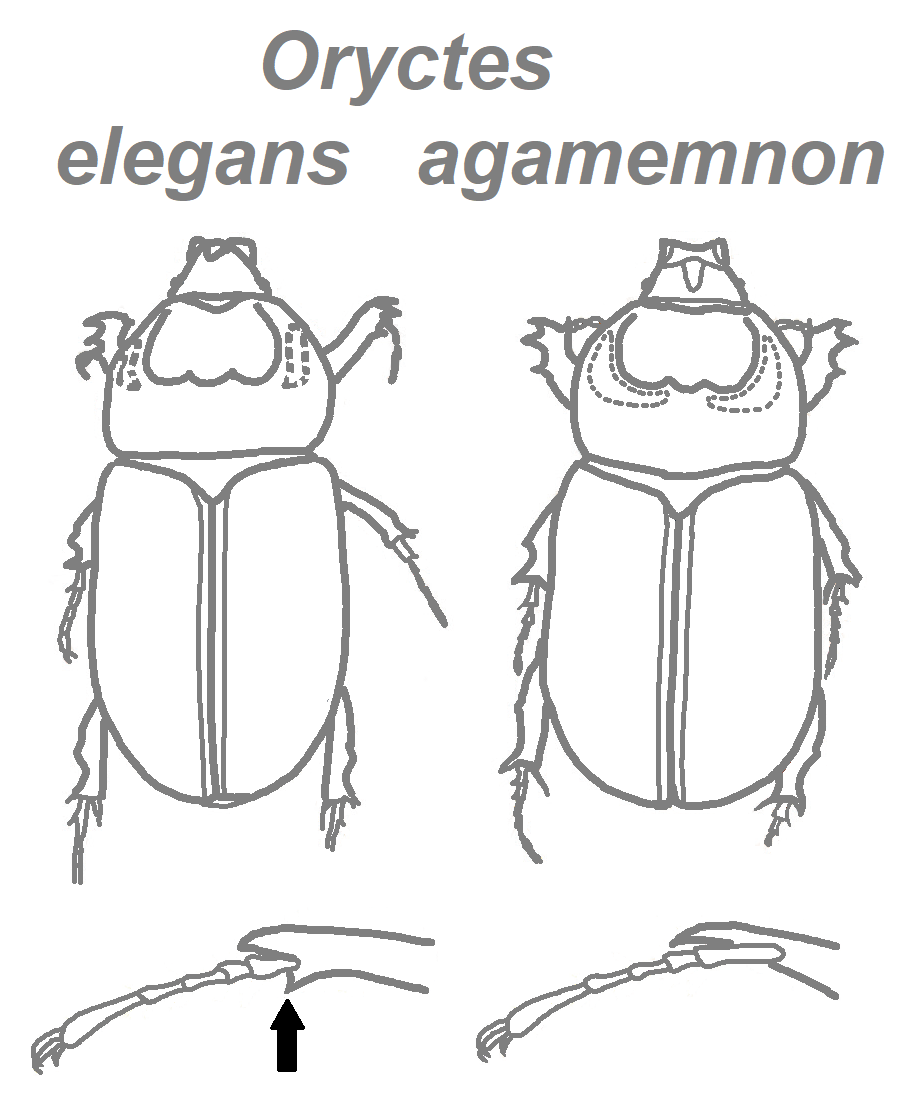
Morphological comparison between Oryctes elegans and O. agamemnon (males). Upper part: dorsal view of whole insects, O. elegans is narrower and parallel-sided. Lower part: Lateral view of fore tibia with a ventral, downward-pointing tooth before its end in O. elegans (arrow).

The morphology and biology of Oryctes elegans is similar to that of Oryctes agamemnon. Both species are pests of date palms and have an overlapping distribution range. They can be reliably separated by the structure of the fore tibia. In O. elegans the fore tibia has a sharp, ventral tooth before its end which is directed downwards. Such a tooth is missing in O. agamemnon. O. elegans is also more slender than O. agamemnon and has parallel sides, whereas in O. agamemnon the sides are rounded.

== Biology and damage to date palms ==
The only known host plant of Oryctes elegans is the date palm (Phoenix dactylifera). The larvae are found in the leaf axils, inside the base of the fronds (leaves), and around the top of the trunk. While the young larvae feed mainly on the dead plant tissue, the older larvae can also bore into living tissue inside the base of fronds and the top parts of the trunk, where they can cause significant damage to the palm. This is in contrast to the biology of most other species of Oryctes which breed and feed only on decaying organic matter. The larvae are also found at the base of the date palms, feeding on decaying organic matter and the roots. Like in other species of Oryctes, the immature stages include the egg stage, three larval stages and the pupal stage, with a total development time of around 5 to 7 months, as determined in the laboratory.

The adult beetles of Oryctes elegans bore into the stalks of fruit bunches and the base of the fronds (leaves) of the date palms. These weaken and often break off as a result of the damage. The species is also suspected of transmitting Fusarium proliferatum, a fungus causing a wilt disease on date palms.

== Management ==
Oryctes elegans is regarded as one of the most important pests of date palms and various studies have been devoted to finding effective control methods for this species. For an individual date palm, it is possible to detect an infestation by O. elegans through acoustic signals.

=== Sanitation ===
As recommended for Oryctes agamemnon, regular, annual cleaning of the crown of date palms is regarded as the most important control method against Oryctes elegans. This involves cutting the old fronds at their base at a downward angle of 45° (which also allows the farmer to climb the trees easily). During the cleaning process, fibres and other debris should be removed from the axils and around the top parts of the trunk, thereby eliminating sites for further oviposition. In the process all Oryctes larvae are removed and later killed. Proper cleaning of the palm crowns and carefully removing all larvae can reduce the population of Oryctes elegans significantly.

=== Trapping ===
Light traps can catch large numbers of adult Oryctes elegans and are also recommended for managing this pest. The traps typically run on batteries which are charged during the day by solar panels. Like several other species of Oryctes, male Oryctes elegans also produce an aggregation pheromone which is attractive to both male and female beetles. Among several compounds emitted by the males, only 4-methyloctanoic acid is attractive. It attracts many more O. elegans beetles when used together with a fresh piece of palm tissue, cut from the shoot of a date palm.

=== Resistance ===
Some date palm varieties are more resistant than others against attacks by this beetle. For example, young date palms (10–20 years) and short varieties experience more damage by Oryctes elegans compared to older palms and tall varieties. Surveys of Oryctes elegans larvae on different varieties of date palms in Iraq suggested that susceptible varieties like "Brem" and "Ustaomran" have softer tissue at their frond base compared to the resistant varieties. Other morphological characters of the date palms which influence resistance to Oryctes include length and orientation of the leaves, type of growth and shape of the fronds.

=== Biological control agents ===
Several studies have addressed the question if natural enemies could be used for the biological control of Oryctes elegans. In Iran and Iraq, Oryctes elegans larvae and adult beetles were shown to be susceptible to the entomopathogenic fungus Metarhizium in laboratory trials. In Saudi Arabia, laboratory and field trials demonstrated that Oryctes elegans larvae can be killed by the nematode species Steinernema glaseri and Steinernema kushidai, although a high concentration of 1000 infective juveniles were needed to achieve 100% mortality. Field trials with placing up to eight wax moth larvae (Galleria mellonella) killed by these nematodes at the base of each date palm tree suggested high mortalities among O. elegans larvae attacking the roots after 6 weeks.

== Taxonomy ==
The entomologist Wilhelm Eduard Leopold Bodo von Bodemeyer described Oryctes piesbergeni shortly after the original description of Oryctes elegans by Heinrich Prell and at that time he might not have been aware of Prell's description. O. piesbergeni is now regarded as a synonym of O. elegans. In 1958, Petrovitz reported and illustrated a species of Oryctes from Iranshahr and Sarawan in south-eastern Iran which he identified as "Oryctes sinaicus Walk.". Oryctes sinaicus Walker, 1871 is currently regarded as a subspecies of Oryctes agamemnon and is only known from the Sinai Peninsula and Israel. Petrovitz' specimens differ from that subspecies and have become known as "Oryctes sinaicus Petrovitz (non Walker)", a name which is now also regarded as a synonym of Oryctes elegans.

== See also ==
- Oryctes agamemnon (Arabian rhinoceros beetle)
- Oryctes monoceros (African rhinoceros beetle)
- Oryctes nasicornis (European rhinoceros beetle)
- Oryctes rhinoceros (coconut rhinoceros beetle)
