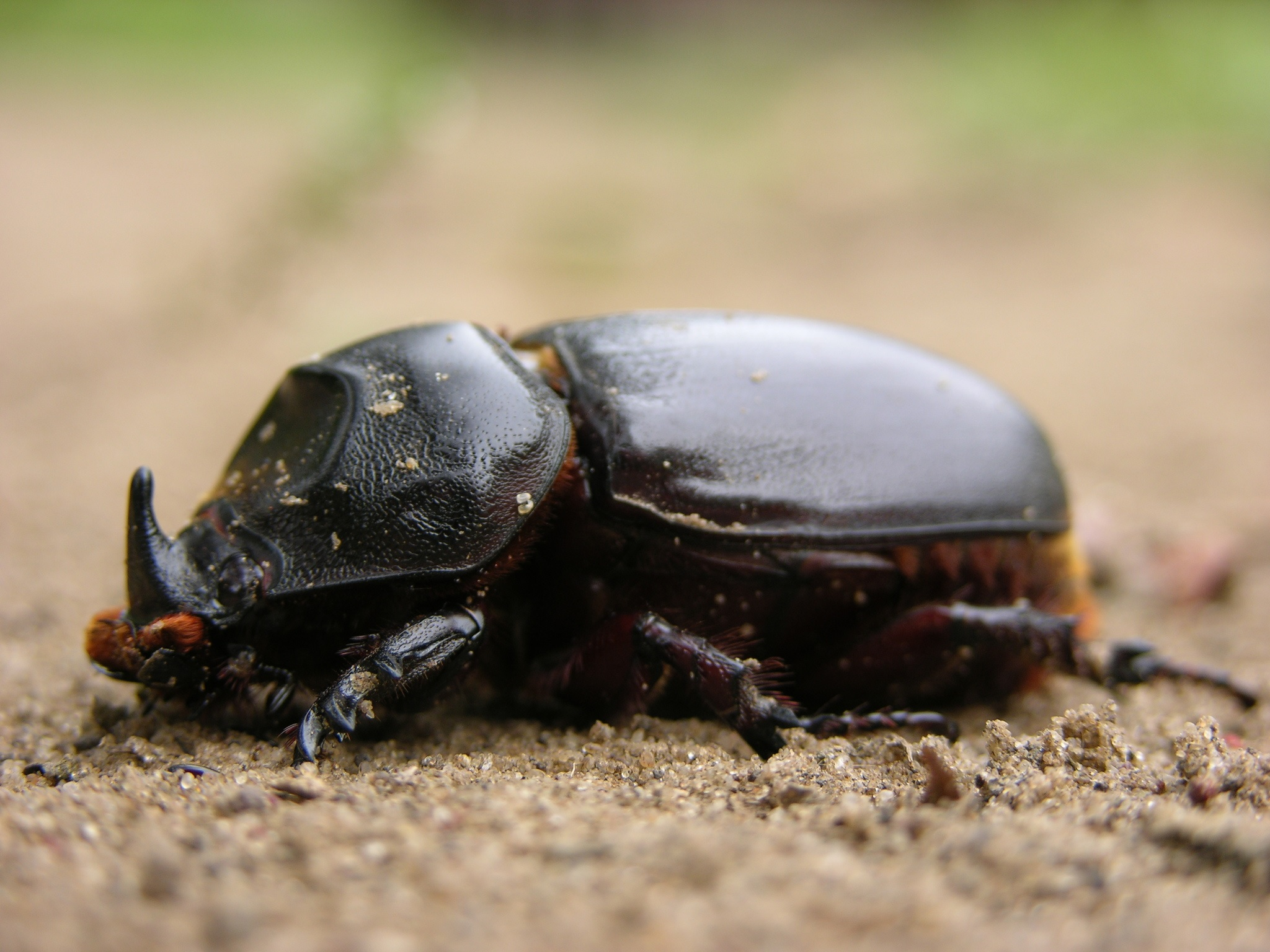
- Female Oryctes monoceros

Scientific classification
- Kingdom: Animalia
- Phylum: Arthropoda
- Clade: Pancrustacea
- Class: Insecta
- Order: Coleoptera
- Suborder: Polyphaga
- Infraorder: Scarabaeiformia
- Family: Scarabaeidae
- Subfamily: Dynastinae
- Tribe: Oryctini
- Genus: Oryctes
- Species: O. monoceros

Binomial name
- Oryctes monoceros (Olivier, 1789)

Synonyms
- Scarabaeus monoceros Olivier, 1789; Oryctes insularis Coquerel, 1852; Oryctes blucheaui Fairmaire, 1898

= Oryctes monoceros =

Species of beetle

Oryctes monoceros, commonly known as African rhinoceros beetle, is a species of rhinoceros beetles from the subfamily Dynastinae (family: Scarabaeidae) which is common in sub-Saharan Africa. Its distribution extends from Senegal and Chad in the North to South Africa in the South and includes the islands of Madagascar, Seychelles and Réunion in the East. O. monoceros is similar in size (~ 4 cm long) and biology to O. rhinoceros found in tropical parts of Asia and the Pacific. Both species are serious pests of coconut and oil palms and attack these by boring into the crown of the palms and feeding on the young developing fronds. Taxonomically, O. monoceros and O. rhinoceros belong to different subgenera of Oryctes, the main differences between both species are: Oryctes monoceros (subgenus Rykanoryctes) has 3 immovable spikes at the tip of the hindtibia and on average males have a shorter horn than O. rhinoceros which is more strongly curved backwards. Oryctes rhinoceros (subgenus Rykanes) has 2 immovable spikes at the tip of the hindtibia and on average males have a longer horn than in O. monoceros which is only slightly curved backwards.

== Distribution ==
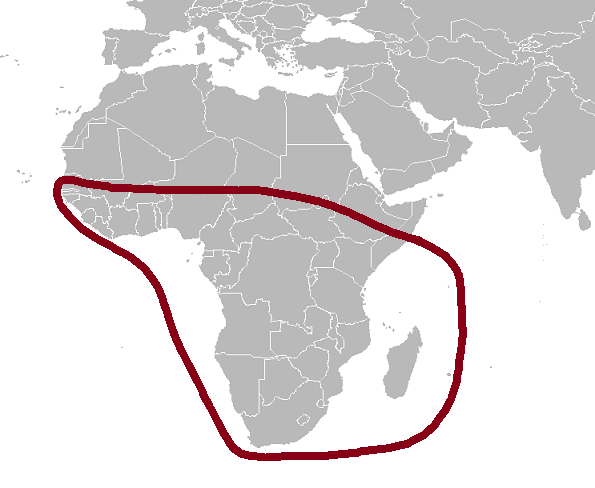
Distribution range of Oryctes monoceros

The type locality of Oryctes monoceros is Senegal, but this is the northern (and western) limit of its distribution range which extends in the South up to South Africa and includes most parts of sub-Saharan Africa. It is especially common in tropical western Africa like the Ivory Coast, Ghana, Togo, Benin and Nigeria. In central and eastern Africa, the northern limits are the southern parts of Chad and Ethiopia. O. monoceros has been also frequently reported from the coastal areas of eastern Africa, like those of Kenya, Tanzania, Mozambique and South Africa. Further, it is found in Madagascar and eastern islands like the Seychelles and Réunion. Ecological studies suggested that the highest environmental suitability for O. monoceros is found in the coastal areas of sub-Saharan Africa.

== Description ==
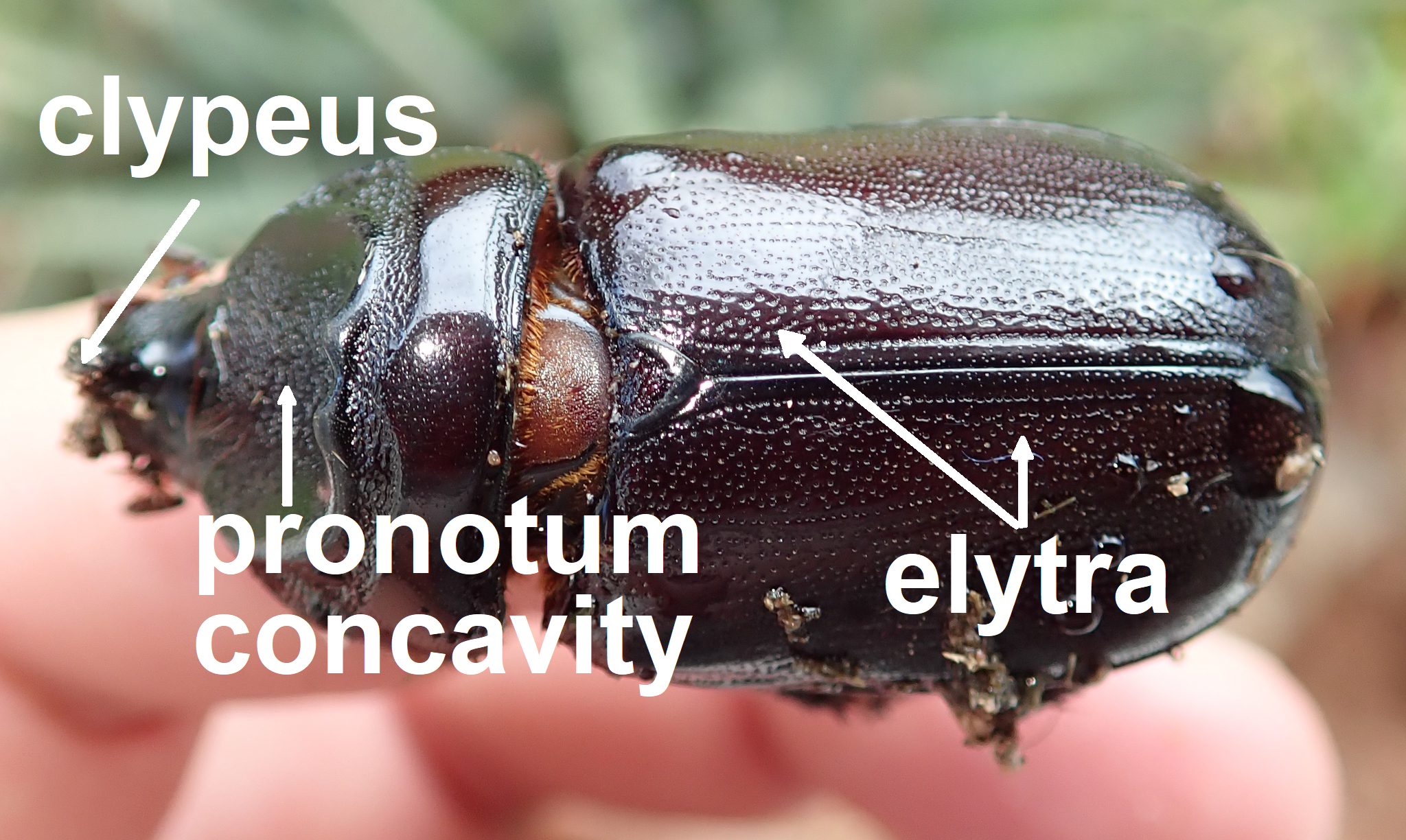
Dorsal view of Oryctes monoceros male with some features of this species labelled

Oryctes monoceros adults are around 4 cm long with a dark reddish brown to black colouration. On average, males are larger than females. The horn of males has a moderate length and is strongly curved to the rear, that of females is very short. O. monoceros belongs to the subgenus Rykanoryctes which is characterized by the end of the hindtibia having three fixed (immovable) spikes (prongs), It can be distinguished from other African species of this subgenus by:

- the shape of the male pronotum,
- the elytra are covered with pits, but have no longitudinal grooves,
- the depression of the pronotum of males has two knobs near the middle of its hind margin,
- the clypeus is broad with a deep rounded notch,
- the elytra are longer than their combined width,
- the foretibia has four teeth.

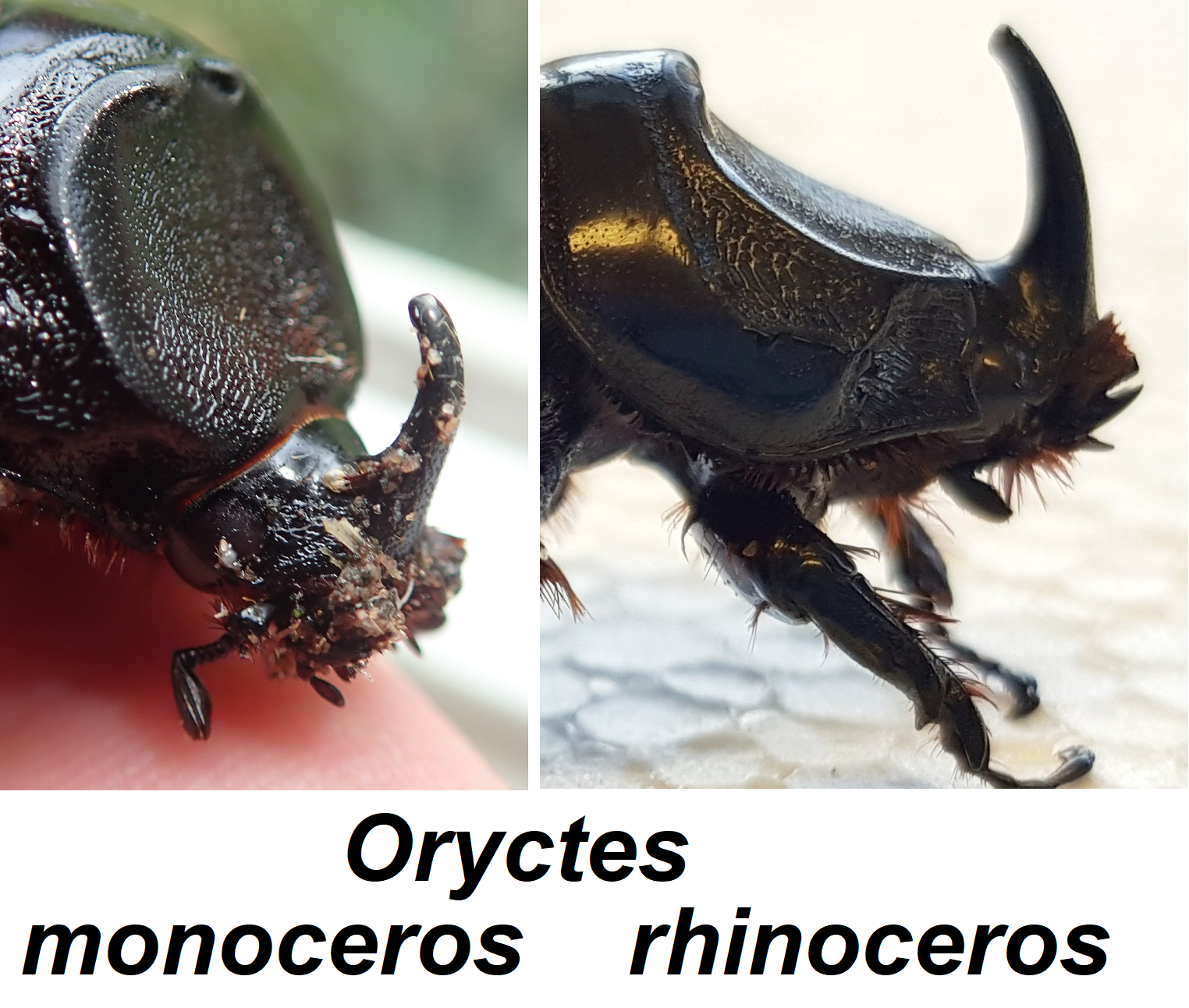
Head of male Oryctes monoceros (left) and that of male O. rhinoceros (right). The horn of O. monoceros is shorter and more curved to the rear.

The size, life cycle, host plants and status as an agricultural pest of O. monoceros are similar to that of Oryctes rhinoceros in the Asia/Pacific region. Because of these similarities, the morphological differences between both species are of interest. In addition, there is a slight overlap in the distribution of both species, e.g. in Réunion. In O. rhinoceros, the tip of the hind tibia has only two fixed spikes (subgenus Rykanes), while there are three in O. monoceros (subgenus Rykanoryctes). In addition, the horn of male O. monoceros is shorter than that of male O. rhinoceros and more curved to the rear. However, in both species, there is also a large variation in the length of the horn.

== Biology and life cycle ==
The biology of Oryctes monoceros is very similar to that of Oryctes rhinoceros in Asia and the Pacific. The main host plants of both species are coconut and oil palms where they can cause serious damage, particularly to young palms. Adult beetles of Oryctes monoceros attack these palms shortly after dark at night and bore into the centre of the palm crown starting from the axil of one of the younger leaves (fronds). Inside the palm crown they feed on the still undeveloped fronds. When the damaged fronds unfold, they show typical triangular cuts or parts of the fronds break off and wilt.

Oryctes monoceros breeds in decaying organic matter, like many other species in the genus Oryctes. The decaying trunks of coconut and oil palms are preferred, but other decaying wood like that of felled forest trees or compost heaps are also suitable for their development. The immature stages include the egg stage, three larval stages and the pupal stage. The development of all immature stages lasts around 4–5 months and the adult stage an additional 2 months.

Population levels of O. monoceros are mainly determined by the abundance and suitability of the available breeding places. Other factors like the presence of parasites, predators and diseases seem to be of lesser importance.

== Outbreaks and management ==
Oryctes monoceros populations and the damage they cause can reach high levels when abundant breeding places are available in form of decaying trunks of coconut palms, oil palms or forest trees. In West Africa for example, serious outbreaks have developed after forests were cleared for establishing palm plantations. A variety of measures are used to control such outbreaks. These include the burning of potential breeding sites, the use of insecticides, trapping the beetles with attractants, barriers to protect the palms from attacks, attempts to introduce a virus disease and the use of the vine Pueraria javanica to overgrow the trunks of the felled forest trees and hide them from the beetles.

In the Ivory Coast, the use of the vine Pueraria javanica was found to be the most effective control method and easier to implement compared to burning the trunks of felled trees and removing their stumps. During large-scale clearing of forests for planting coconut or oil palms, the felled trunks were piled up in windrows and seeds of Pueraria javanica were sown around the windrows. In the tropics, this vine quickly overgrows the trunks, hiding them from Oryctes monoceros and repelling beetles searching for breeding sites.

The use of attractant traps to reduce the number of O. monoceros beetles attacking palms has also given promising results. In the Pacific, ethyl chrysanthemate (also called ethyl chrysanthemumate) has been found to be attractive to male and female Oryctes rhinoceros. In West Africa, trapping with this chemical could reduce attacks on coconut palms by O. monoceros, but not prevent them completely. From the results it appeared that ethyl chrysanthemate mimics and competes with the attraction of beetles to breedings sites. In 1994, a male-produced aggregation pheromone, ethyl 4-methyloctanoate, was discovered that also attracts both males and females of O. monoceros and is more effective than ethyl chrysanthemate. The attraction of the aggregation pheromone was enhanced with a compound extracted from oil palm fruit bunches and could reduce the damage to coconut palms significantly. Another form of trapping is to place rolled up discarded fishing nets into the axils of young palms. Beetles visiting the palms get trapped in the fishing nets and in turn attract additional beetles.

In southern Asia and the Pacific, the Oryctes rhinoceros nudivirus has been shown to be the most important natural enemy of Oryctes rhinoceros and attempts have been made to use it also against Oryctes monoceros. When the larvae of both species were infected with the virus in laboratory experiments, the results suggested that O. monoceros is more resistant to the virus. Comparisons between Oryctes boas and O. monoceros gave similar results with O. boas being more susceptible. However, releases of the virus against O. monoceros populations in the Seychelles and in Tanzania successfully established the virus in O. monoceros populations, resulted in a high disease incidence among adult beetles (20–60% infections) and reduced the O. monoceros population by 30% in the Seychelles.

== Taxonomy ==
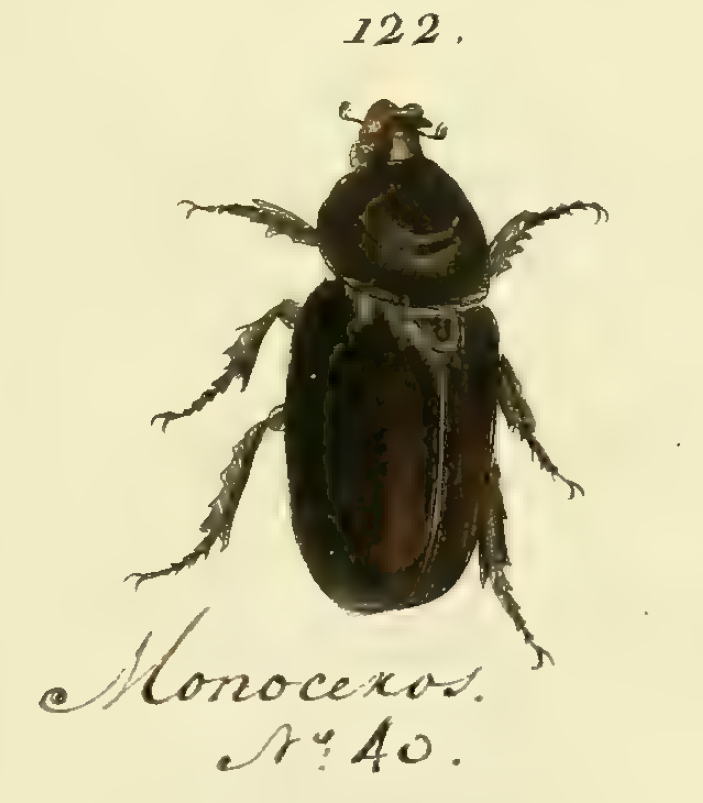
Original illustration of Scarabaeus monoceros by Olivier in 1789

Oryctes monoceros was described by Olivier under the name Scarabaeus monoceros before the genus Oryctes was introduced. However, among his listing of 241 species of Scarabaeus, Olivier placed the species monoceros next to the species nasicornis, the type species of Oryctes, noted the similarity to Oryctes rhinoceros (Scarabaeus rhinoceros) and grouped it together with three other species now assigned to Oryctes, O. boas, O. augias and O. tarandus. Hermann Burmeister assigned Scarabaeus monoceros to the genus Oryctes and Sebö Endrödi established that the subsequently described species Oryctes insularis and Oryctes blucheaui are synonyms of Oryctes monoceros.

== See also ==
- Oryctes agamemnon (Arabian rhinoceros beetle)
- Oryctes boas
- Oryctes elegans (date palm fruit stalk borer)
- Oryctes nasicornis (European rhinoceros beetle)
- Oryctes rhinoceros (coconut rhinoceros beetle)
