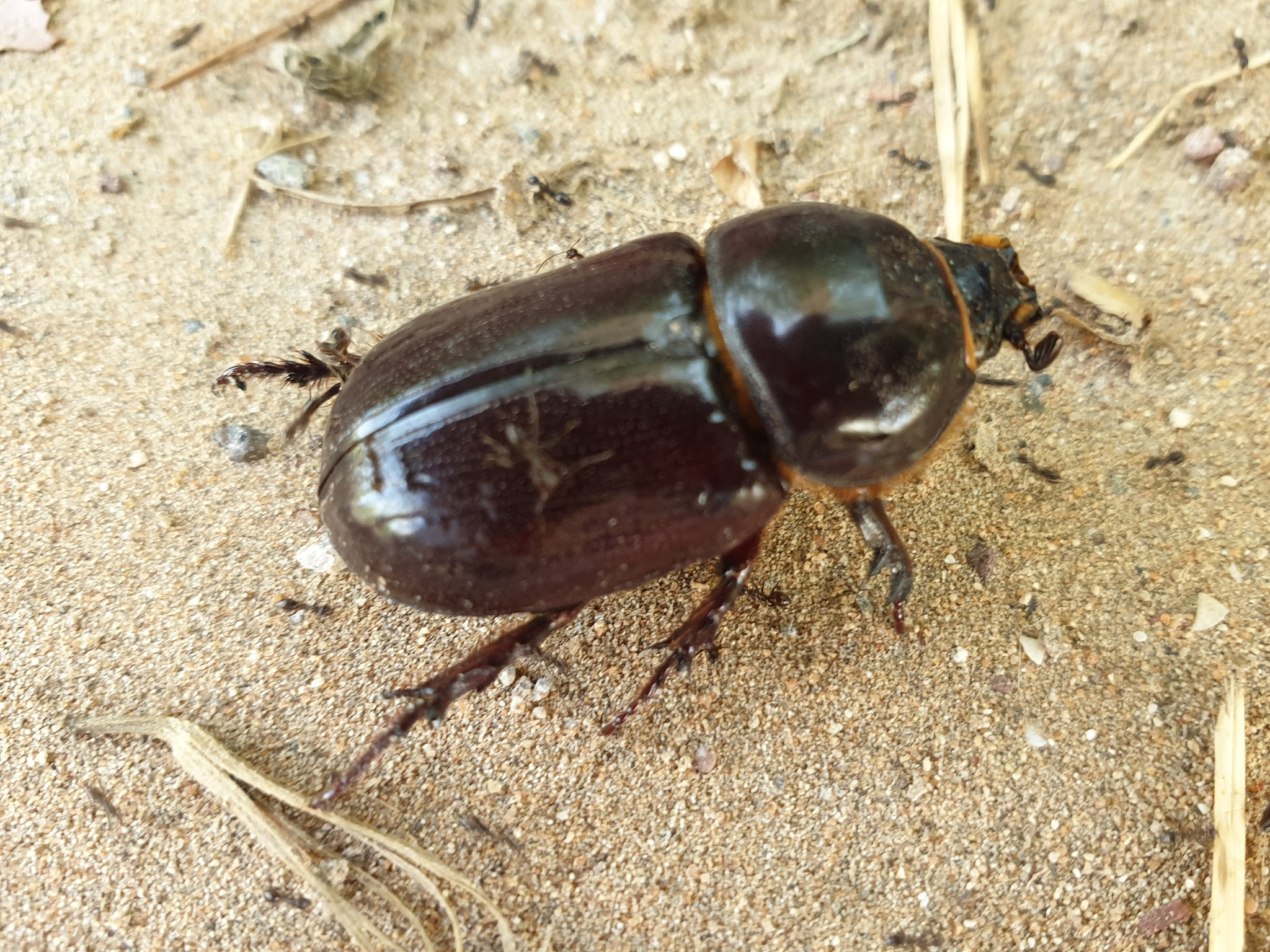
- Oryctes agamemnon female from Dubai (UAE)

Scientific classification
- Kingdom: Animalia
- Phylum: Arthropoda
- Clade: Pancrustacea
- Class: Insecta
- Order: Coleoptera
- Suborder: Polyphaga
- Infraorder: Scarabaeiformia
- Family: Scarabaeidae
- Subfamily: Dynastinae
- Tribe: Oryctini
- Genus: Oryctes
- Species: O. agamemnon

Binomial name
- Oryctes agamemnon Burmeister, 1847

Synonyms
- Oryctes sinaica Walker, 1871; Oryctes arabicus Fairmaire, 1896; Oryctes matthiesseni Reitter, 1907; Oryctes desertorum Arrow, 1910; Oryctes agamemnon persicus Endrödi, 1938

= Oryctes agamemnon =

Species of beetle

Oryctes agamemnon, commonly known as Arabian rhinoceros beetle, is a species of rhinoceros beetles from the subfamily Dynastinae (family: Scarabaeidae) in the Near East and northern Africa. The larval stages are serious pests of date palms and in particular damage the respiratory roots at the base of the palms which weakens the trees and can cause them to fall down. The adult beetles bore into the stalks of the date bunches or the base of the palm fronds (leaves), often causing these to break off. Compared to many other species of Oryctes, O. agamemnon adults are typically small (~ 30 mm long) and compact. They can be identified by the shape of the concavity on the pronotum, the hind tibia having three fixed spikes at the end (subgenus Rykanoryctes) and the foretibia lacking a strong tooth directed downwards before its end. Four subspecies are recognized which are geographically separated:

- subsp. agamemnon in north-eastern Africa, mainly in Sudan,
- subsp. arabicus in Saudi Arabia and neighbouring countries, but also introduced into Tunisia and Algeria,
- subsp. matthiesseni in Iran, Afghanistan and Pakistan.
- subsp. sinaicus in Egypt and Israel,

== Distribution ==
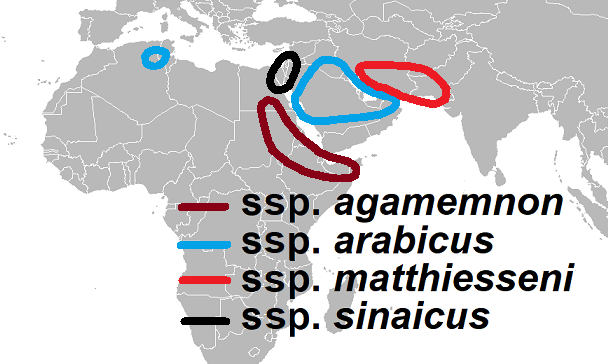
Distribution ranges of the subspecies of Oryctes agamemnon: ssp. agamemnon (brown outline), ssp. arabicus (blue outline), ssp. matthiesseni (red outline) and ssp. sinaicus (black outline)

The type locality for Oryctes agamemnon ssp. agamemnon has been only given as Africa. This subspecies is known mainly from Sudan and "Nubia", there is also a record from "Somali" probably referring to Somalia. The subspecies sinaicus (originally described as sinaica without type locality) is found in Egypt (Sinai Peninsula) and Israel. While the subspecies agamemnon and sinaicus are both uncommon, the subspecies arabicus is more common and regarded as a pest of date palms. Its type locality is Hejaz, the western coast of Saudi Arabia, but it has been also reported from other parts of Saudi Arabia, as well as from Iraq, the United Arab Emirates and Oman. Further, the subspecies arabicus has been accidentally introduced into Tunisia with date palm seedlings from the Near East and has spread further to Algeria. The subspecies matthiesseni is found in parts of Iran, Afghanistan and Pakistan.

== Description ==
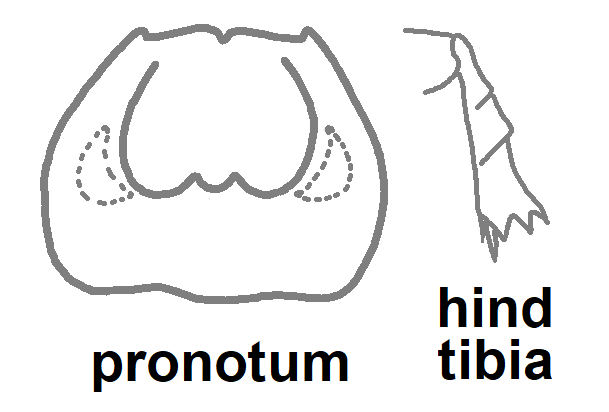
Oryctes agamemnon male - left: shape of pronotum with an outline of the depression (concavity), right: hind tibia showing three fixed (immovable) spikes and two movable processes at the tip

Compared to other species of Oryctes, Oryctes agamemnon is a smaller species with an average length of around 30 mm and a reddish brown colouration. It belongs to the subgenus Rykanoryctes which is characterized by the end of the hind tibia having 3 immovable spikes apart from some moveable processes (see illustration on the right). It can be distinguished from other members of that subgenus by a combination of different characteristics:

- The central depression (concavity) of the pronotum has an approximately circular outline. In males it covers about 60% of the length of the pronotum, but is smaller in females.
- The hind margin of the concavity of the pronotum has two knobs in males (see illustration on the right), but only one in females.
- The clypeus is very broad with a deep indent.
- The elytra are longer than their combined width. Their surface is mainly smooth and glossy, but can be covered with a varying density of small pits.

Like in other species of Oryctes, there are clear morphological differences between males and females. Males of Oryctes agamemnon have a medium-sized horn which is strongly curved backwards. Females have a very short horn or a knob, apart from the difference in the concavity mentioned above (smaller with only 1 knob at the hind margin). In both sexes, the last abdominal segment, the pygidium, has few if any hairs or bristles.

Four subspecies of Oryctes agamemnon are recognized, based mainly on their size and the surface of their elytra:

- subsp. agamemnon - the adults are large, usually more than 30 mm long; the surface of the elytra is mainly smooth with some very small pits;
- subsp. arabicus - the adults are smaller and more elongated; the surface of the elytra has larger pits compared to the ssp. agamemnon;
- subsp. matthiesseni - the pits on the surface of the elytra are dense and deep;
- subsp. sinaicus - this subspecies is very similar to the ssp. arabicus; the difference between both subspecies is not clear since Walker's type of Oryctes sinaica has been lost.

Oryctes agamemnon and Oryctes elegans have a similar size, biology and status as a pest of date palms. Both species also overlap in their distribution range. Therefore, the morphological differences between them are of interest:

- the fore tibia of Oryctes elegans has a sharp ventral, fixed tooth near its end, pointing downwards, which is missing in O. agamemnon,
- Oryctes agamemnon is broader than O. elegans.

== Biology and damage to date palms ==
Date palms are the only host plants for both larvae and adults of Oryctes agamemnon. The larvae live mainly in dead parts of the trees like the petioles of old, dead fronds, dead roots and debris at the base of the trees. However, they also damage live parts in the palm crown, the roots and the new shoots at the base of the palms which are used for planting. The immature stages are the egg stage (about 2 weeks), three larval stages (5, 7–9 and 15–23 weeks) and the pupal stage (3–4 weeks), giving a total of about 8–9 months for the development from egg to adult beetle.

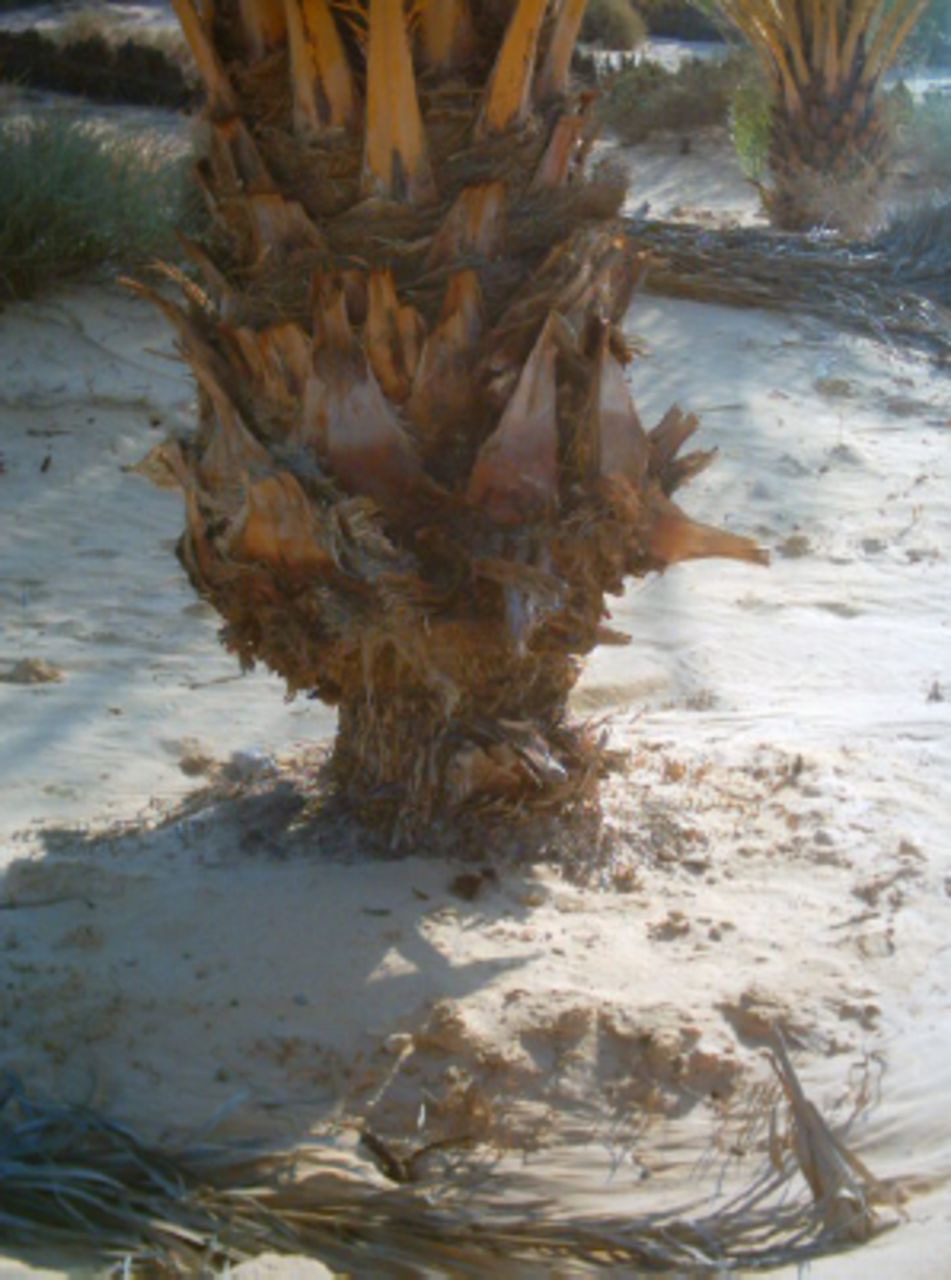
Base of date palm trunk, heavily damaged by Oryctes agamemnon larvae in Tunisia

Damage to date palms has been mainly reported by the subspecies arabicus in Tunisia, Algeria and in parts of the Arabian Peninsula. The damage by the larvae to the roots near the soil surface, the respiratory roots, as well as to the recently planted young date palms is most destructive. Young date palms often die due to the attacks and mature date palms are seriously weakened by larval feeding on the respiratory roots which often causes the trees to fall down.

In Tunisia and Algeria, the adults of Oryctes agamemnon have not been observed to cause any significant damage. However, in the Arabian Peninsula, the adults attack the stalks of the date bunches, similar to the damage done by Oryctes elegans. The infested fruit bunches can break off. The adults might also tunnel into the base of the fronds.

== Management ==
Regular, annual cleaning of the date palms is the most important control method against Oryctes agamemnon infestations. This involves removing old and dead fronds from the crowns, pruning the dead fronds at their base, cleaning the axils from debris and Oryctes larvae and removing dead fronds and debris from the base of the palms. The dead fronds and plant debris are the oviposition sites for the female beetles and serve as food for the young larvae. Only the older larvae damage the living tissue.

Oryctes agamemnon was introduced into Tunisia with date palm seedlings from the Near East. It further spread within Tunisia and to Algeria in the same manner. Therefore, it is important to prevent the movement of date palm seedlings out of the infested areas with effective quarantine procedures. Additional control methods include light traps to reduce the population of adult beetles. There is also evidence that some date palm varieties are more susceptible to beetle attacks.

== Taxonomy ==
Oryctes agamemnon shows considerable variation in some characters like the density of small pits on the surface of the elytra. This has resulted in the species having been described repeatedly and has led to divergent views on which forms are separate species and which forms should be regarded as subspecies. Currently, the taxonomic system established by Sebö Endrödi in 1973 is accepted. That system recognizes the following four subspecies (they are not separate species because intermediate forms exist):

1. Oryctes agamemnon subsp. agamemnon Burmeister, 1847
2. Oryctes agamemnon subsp. sinaicus Walker, 1871 (syn. Oryctes sinaica Walker, 1871)
3. Oryctes agamemnon subsp. arabicus Fairmaire, 1896 (syn. Oryctes arabicus Fairmaire, 1896)
4. Oryctes agamemnon subsp. matthiesseni Reitter 1907 (syn. Oryctes matthiesseni Reitter 1907; Oryctes desertorum Arrow,1910; Oryctes agamemnon persicus Endrödi, 1938)

== See also ==
- Oryctes elegans (date palm fruit stalk borer)
- Oryctes monoceros (African rhinoceros beetle)
- Oryctes nasicornis (European rhinoceros beetle)
- Oryctes rhinoceros (coconut rhinoceros beetle)
