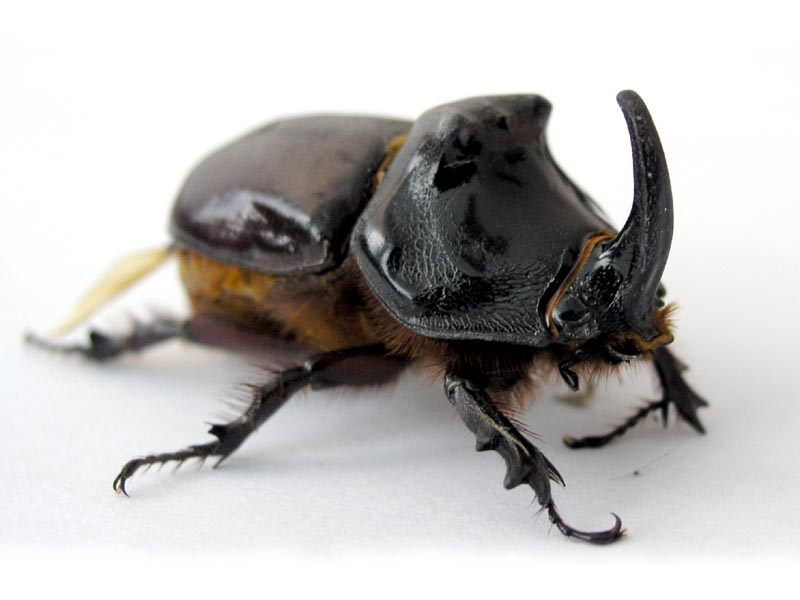

Scientific classification
- Kingdom: Animalia
- Phylum: Arthropoda
- Clade: Pancrustacea
- Class: Insecta
- Order: Coleoptera
- Suborder: Polyphaga
- Infraorder: Scarabaeiformia
- Superfamily: Scarabaeoidea
- Family: Scarabaeidae
- Subfamily: Dynastinae
- Tribe: Oryctini
- Genus: Oryctes; Hellwig, 1798

= Oryctes =

Genus of beetles

Oryctes is the economically most important genus of rhinoceros beetles in the subfamily Dynastinae (family: Scarabaeidae) and includes serious pests of palm trees. A total of 47 species have been assigned to the genus, including 2 fossil ones. The extant species are widely distributed in Africa, as well as in Europe, Asia and the Pacific. No established populations are known from the Americas. The species are typically between 30 and 60 mm long, dark brown to black, with a robust body and a strong cuticle. They can be distinguished from other genera in the tribe Oryctini by the structure of the pronotum, the horn on the head, the mouthparts and other features.

Type species: Scarabaeus nasicornis Linnaeus, 1758, a synonym of Oryctes nasicornis

== Distribution ==
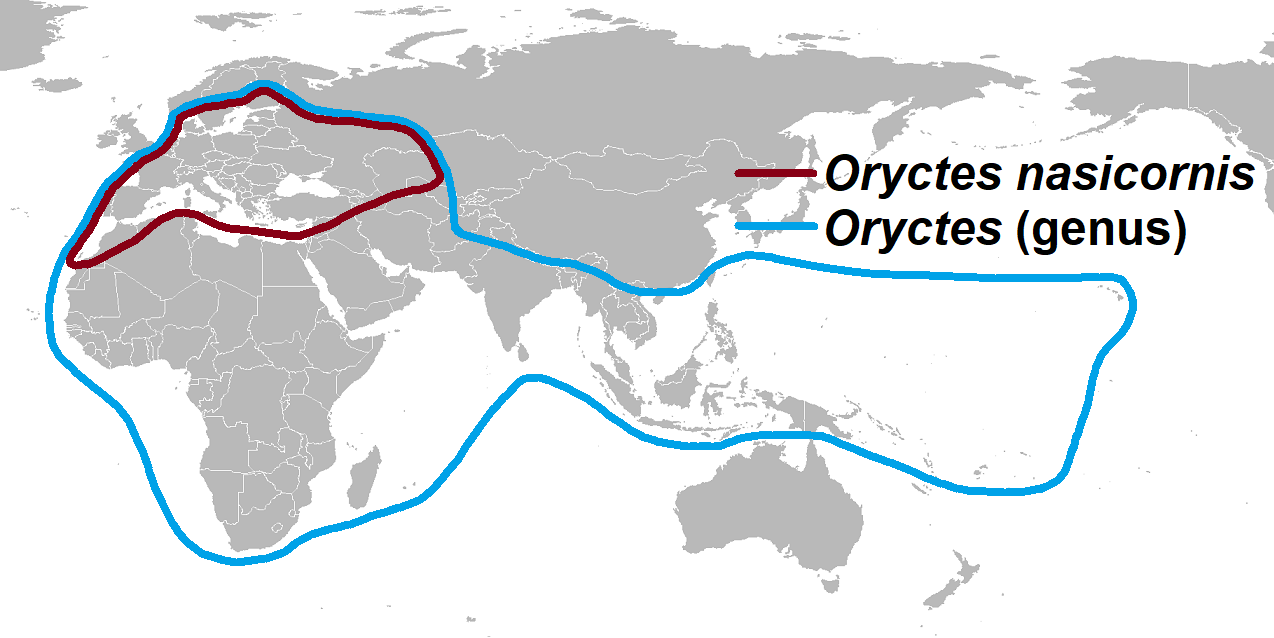
Distribution ranges of the species in the genus Oryctes (blue outline) and that of Oryctes nasicornis, the type species (brown outline)

Most of the extant species of Oryctes are found in Africa with only 8 species in Asia and the Pacific, 3 in the Near East and 1 in Europe. The 33 African species are mainly distributed in sub-Saharan countries, with 18 of them found in Madagascar and surrounding islands like Réunion, Mayotte, Mauritius, the Comoros and the Island of Rodrigues. Eight species (Oryctes amberiensis, O. anguliceps, O. augias, O. clypealis, O. colonicus, O. dollei, O. politus and O. ranavalo) are endemic to Madagascar and occur nowhere else.

O. nasicornis is the only European species. It is widespread in most European countries and has been also reported from some of the neighbouring regions like parts of northern Africa, the Near East and Turkey. Two species (Oryctes agamemnon and O. elegans) are common in the Near East region. A third one, Oryctes richteri, has been reported only from Iran. Oryctes rhinoceros is widespread in southern Asia and the Pacific. Other Asia/Pacific species include Oryctes ata in Turkmenistan, O. centaurus in Papua New Guinea, O. forceps in northern India ("British Bootan, Padong"), O. gnu (Malaysia, Indonesia, Thailand, the Philippines, and southern China), O. heros in Timor, O. hisamatsui in Japan, and O. nudicauda in Myanmar. No established populations are known from the Americas. Two extinct species, described from German deposits, are also sometimes assigned to Oryctes.

== Description ==
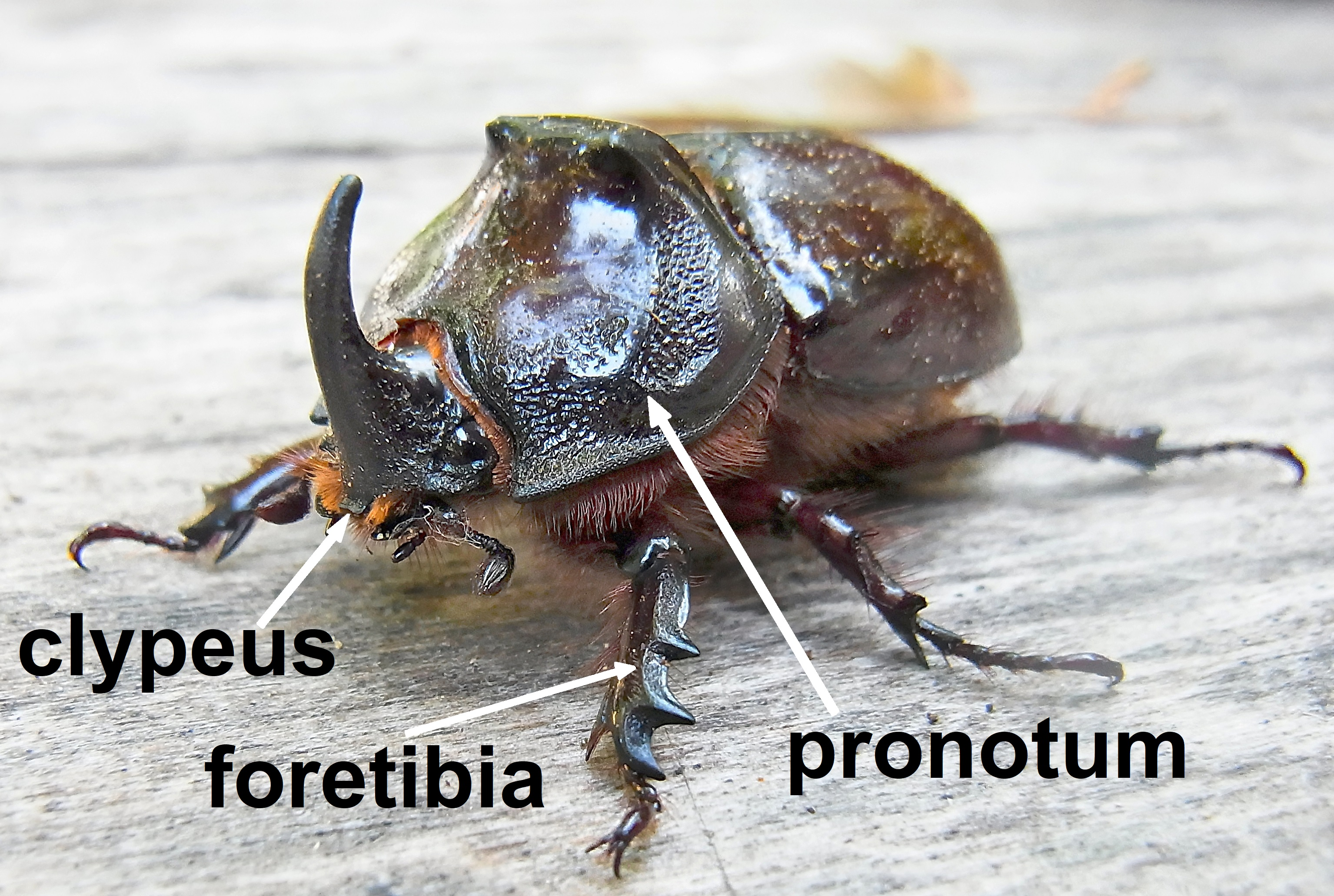
Frontal view of Oryctes nasicornis male with some characteristic features of the genus Oryctes labelled

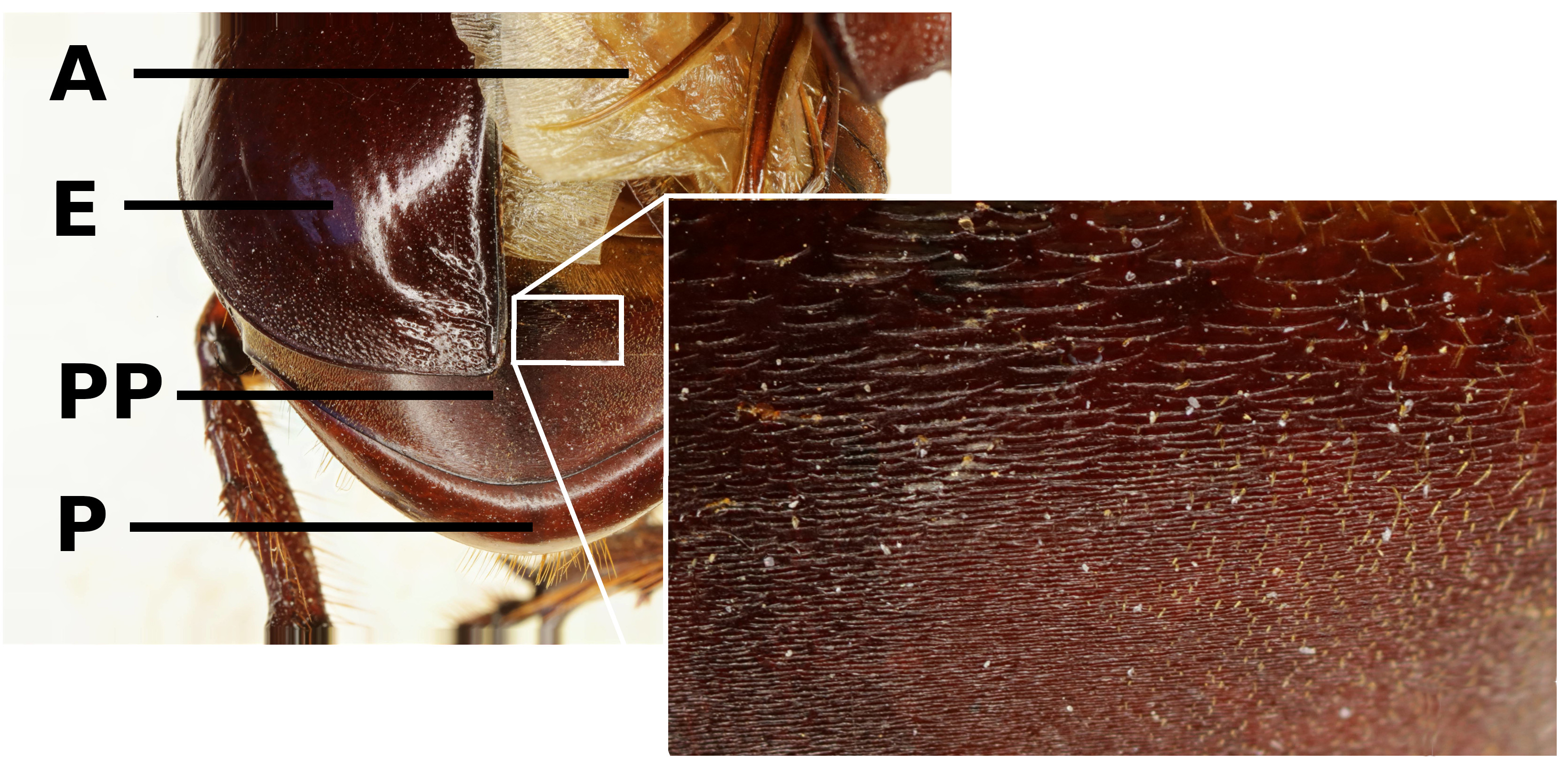
Tip of the abdomen of Oryctes nasicornis with the right elytron removed to show the stridulation area with a section enlarged. A = right hindwing (ala), E = left elytron, PP = propygidium, P = pygidium

The species of Oryctes can be distinguished from other genera in the subfamily Dynastinae and the tribe Oryctini by a combination of different morphological features. These include:

- Medium-sized to large rhinoceros beetles, typically between 30 and 60 mm long, and dark reddish brown to black.
- The head has a single horn in males. Females have a short horn or a knob.
- The antennae have 10 segments with the segments of the terminal club having a similar length in both males and females.
- The clypeus often has a central notch which can be quite deep, the clypeus may be broad.
- The mandibles are broad without an outer tooth, their ends are rounded or obliquely cut off.
- The pronotum of males has a large central depression (concavity) usually covering more than half the pronotum, typically with two knobs or humps (but not horns) near the middle of the hind margin of the concavity. Some species have only one knob and Oryctes nasicornis has three. The morphology of the sides of the pronotum is also characteristic. Females have a smaller and shallower depression with no or small knobs at the hind margin.
- The dorsal part of the pre-last abdominal segment, the propygidium, has a stridulatory area, both in males and females. Adults can communicate by rubbing this area over the tips of their elytra.

Within a given species, there can be a considerable variation in size, length of the horn and structure of the pronotum. In some species, such variation may be due to the suitability of the breeding substrate. However, in the type species, Oryctes nasicornis, such variation is often genetic and is linked to different subspecies.

The subgenera and individual species of Oryctes are characterized, among others by:

- the length of the adult beetle,
- the size and shape of the horn,
- the structure of the clypeus,
- the detailed structure of the pronotum,
- the teeth on the foretibia,
- the teeth on the tip of the hind tibia,
- the shape of the elytra,
- the presence/arrangement of pits or grooves on the elytra.

== Biology ==
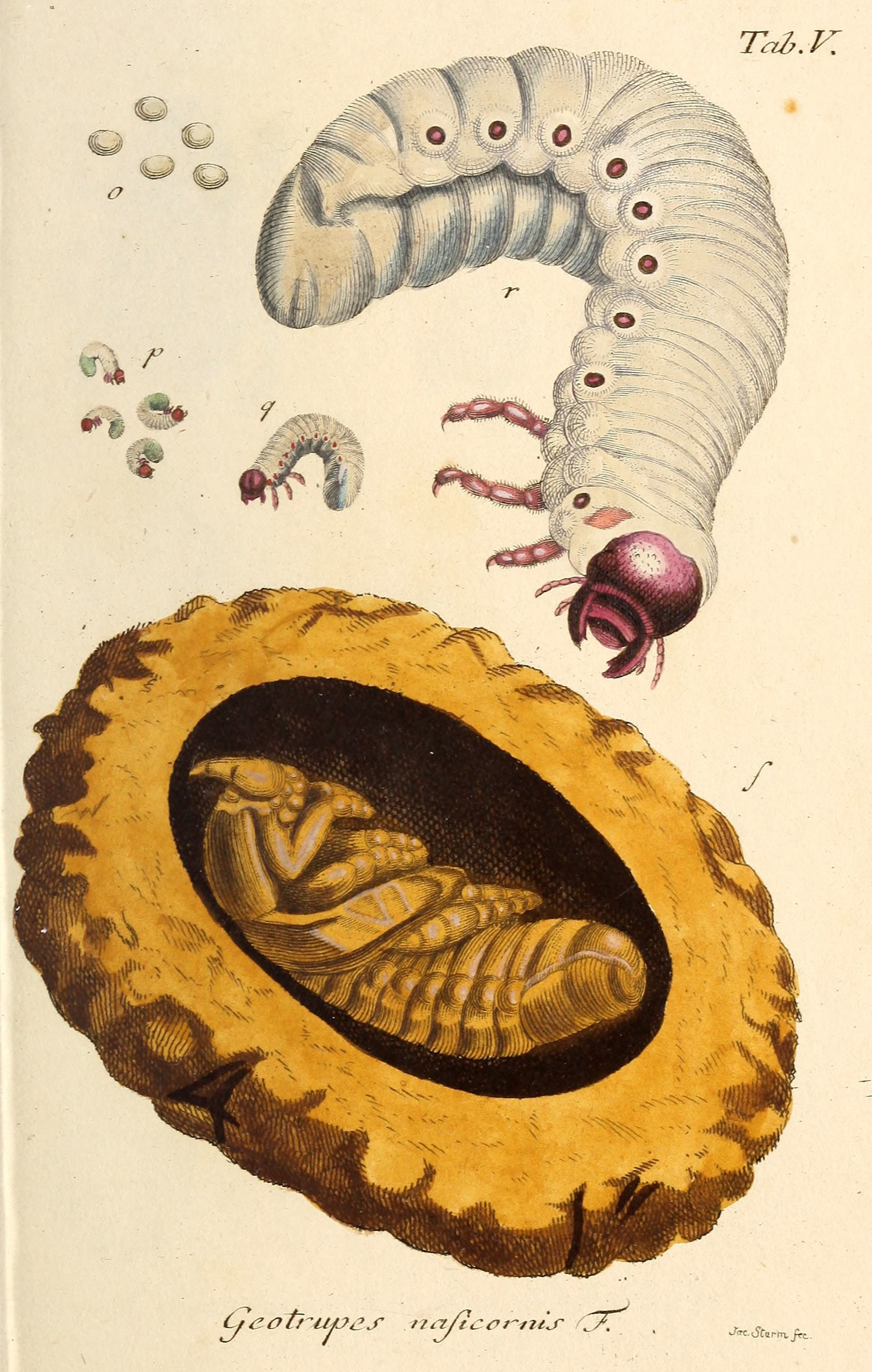
Immature stages of Oryctes nasicornis

Species of Oryctes typically breed in decaying wood like rotting tree trunks or other decaying organic matter. While a given species might have a preference for a certain type of wood, there seems to be some flexibility. Females of several species readily lay eggs in old sawdust heaps near sawmills or compost heaps in gardens. For example, decaying coconut trunks are the preferred and traditional breeding sites for Oryctes rhinoceros in Asia and decaying oak bark and wood for Oryctes nasicornis in Europe, but both species often breed in old sawdust heaps, compost heaps and other decaying organic matter. In some species, the larvae can also feed on the living tissue of tree trunks and roots. The immature stages include the egg stage, three larval stages and the pupal stage. The development from egg to adult may be completed in about half a year, but can also extend over several years.

Oryctes adults are nocturnal and are often attracted to light. Except for the pest species, little else is known about the adult behaviour of many species, including their feeding habits. Adult beetles from the subfamily Dynastinae typically wound the bark of tree trunks (bark-carving) and feed on the sap which is excreted from the damaged trunk. Such a behaviour is also suspected for some species of Oryctes, while others might not feed at all in the adult stage. As described in the next section, the adults of pest species feed by boring into living palms.

== Agricultural pests ==
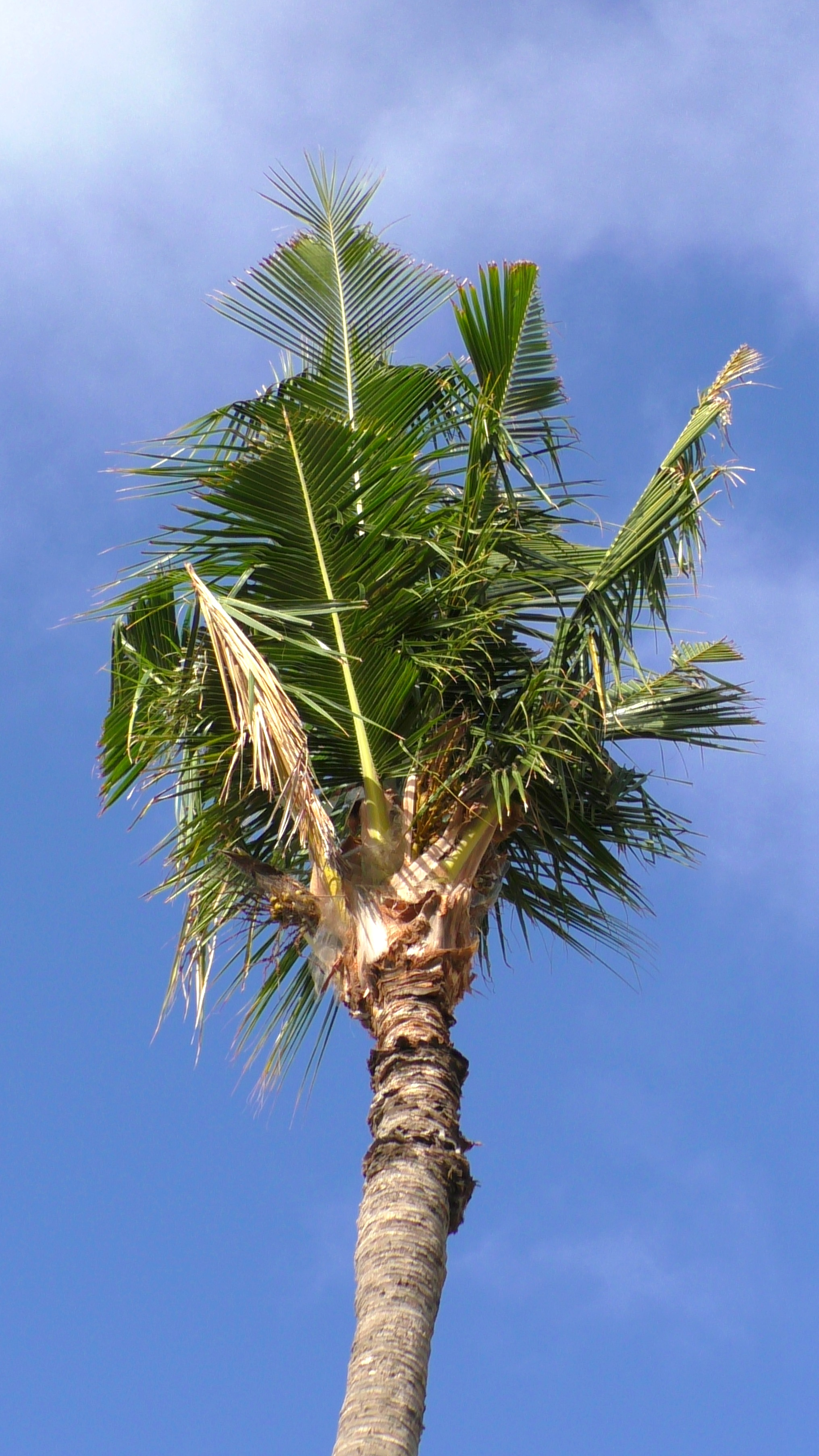
Coconut palm in Hawaii, heavily damaged by Oryctes rhinoceros attacks.

A number of Oryctes species cause damage to palm trees and are regarded as agricultural pests. The four species discussed in the following paragraphs are the most destructive:

Adult beetles of Oryctes rhinoceros and Oryctes monoceros attack coconut and oil palms in the Asia/Pacific region, and in Africa respectively. The beetle bore into the centre of the palm crown, starting at one of the middle leaf axils. They then feed on the very young, still developing leaves (fronds), usually cutting off a significant part of the leaflets or parts of the whole fronds. Triangular cuts on the fronds are typical signs of Oryctes attacks. Damaged palms have a reduced nut production and young palms often die after heavy attacks. The larval stages of both species do not cause any damage.

Oryctes elegans and Oryctes agamemnon are pests of date palms in the Near East and in northern Africa. In both species the larval as well as the adult stage can cause significant damage. The adults of Oryctes elegans bore into the stalks of the date bunches, often causing the bunches to break off. They may also bore into the base of the fronds, causing these to break off. The larvae of O. elegans live in the palm crown and at the base of the palms feeding on dead old fronds and other decaying matter but may also damage live tissue. For example, they may invade and damage the top part of the trunk or feed on the roots and the new shoots at the base of the palm.

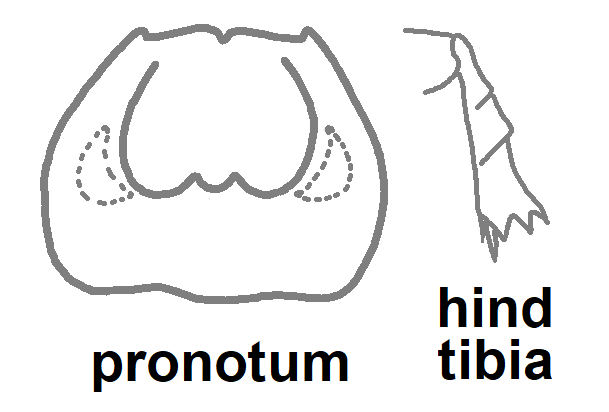
Oryctes agamemnon male - Left: shape of pronotum with central depression (concavity) and two knobs at the hind margin - Right: hind tibia showing 3 fixed (immovable) spikes and 2 movable processes (subgenus Rykanoryctes).

Oryctes agamemnon has a similar biology, but in this species, the larval stages cause most of the damage. The larvae can be very destructive when they destroy the respiratory roots near the base of the date palm which weakens the tree and can cause the palm to fall down after heavy attacks. Damage to the new shoots at the palm base which are used for planting can be also severe. Damage by larvae is particularly serious in Tunisia and Algeria which were invaded by O. agamemnon starting in the 1990s. In the Near East, adults of O. agamemnon also infest the stalks of the fruit bunches like O. elegans. However, such damage was not observed in Tunisia and Algeria.

== Taxonomy and species ==
For many years, the authorship of the genus Oryctes has been cited as "Illiger, 1798" who described the genus in his book "Verzeichniss der Käfer Preussens" [Catalogue of the beetles of Prussia]. However, the name was first used by Hellwig in a note a few months earlier who wrote that he initiated the work on the beetles of Prussia, but did not have time to complete it and handed it over to Illiger. Illiger worked under him for several years and the book was apparently a collaborative effort by both authors. However, Hellwig is now regarded as the sole author of Oryctes since he made the name first available and mentioned the names of several species (like rhinoceros or nasicornis) that are part of the genus. According to Illiger, the genus name Oryctes was derived from Ancient Greek ὀρυκτήρ (oruktḗs), meaning "digger".

In 1888, Paul Oppenheim introduced the genus Oryctites when he described the fossil species Oryctites fossilis and Oryctites is sometimes cited as a synonym of Oryctes. However, the genus name Oryctites has been considered to be taxonomically invalid and there are doubts if the species fossilis belongs to Oryctes.

A number of subgenera have been described under the genus Oryctes and the following species are currently (2025) recognized:

1. Oryctes agamemnon Burmeister, 1847 - Arabian rhinoceros beetle
2. Oryctes amberiensis Sternberg, 1910
3. Oryctes anguliceps Fairmaire, 1901
4. Oryctes ata Semenov & Medvedev, 1932
5. Oryctes augias (Olivier, 1789)
6. Oryctes boas (Fabricius, 1775)
7. Oryctes borbonicus Dechambre, 1982
8. Oryctes capucinus Arrow, 1937
9. Oryctes centaurus Sternberg, 1910
10. Oryctes cherlonneixi Dechambre, 1996
11. Oryctes chevrolatii Guérin-Méneville, 1844
12. Oryctes clypealis Fairmaire, 1897
13. Oryctes colonicus Coquerel, 1852
14. Oryctes comoriensis Fairmaire, 1893
15. Oryctes congonis Endrödi, 1969
16. Oryctes curvicornis Sternberg, 1910
17. Oryctes dollei Fairmaire, 1897
18. Oryctes elegans Prell, 1914 - date palm fruit stalk borer
19. Oryctes erebus Burmeister, 1847
20. Oryctes forceps Dechambre, 1980
21. †Oryctes fossilis (Oppenheim, 1888)
22. Oryctes gigas Castelnau, 1840
23. Oryctes gnu Mohnike, 1874 - Malaysian rhinoceros beetle
24. Oryctes gracilis Prell, 1934
25. Oryctes heros Endrödi, 1973
26. Oryctes hisamatsui Nagai, 2002
27. Oryctes latecavatus Fairmaire, 1891
28. Oryctes mayottensis Dechambre, 1982
29. Oryctes minor Waterhouse, 1876
30. Oryctes monardi Beck, 1942
31. Oryctes monoceros (Olivier, 1789) - African rhinoceros beetle
32. Oryctes nasicornis (Linnaeus, 1758) type species (as Scarabaeus nasicornis L.) - the European rhinoceros beetle
33. Oryctes nudicauda Arrow, 1910
34. Oryctes ohausi Minck, 1913
35. Oryctes owariensis (Palisot de Beauvois, 1806)
36. †Oryctes pluto Weyenbergh, 1869
37. Oryctes politus Fairmaire, 1901
38. Oryctes prolixus Wollaston, 1864
39. Oryctes pyrrhus Burmeister, 1847
40. Oryctes ranavalo Coquerel, 1852
41. Oryctes rhinoceros (Linnaeus, 1758) - coconut rhinoceros beetle, Asiatic rhinoceros beetle
42. Oryctes richteri Petrovitz, 1958
43. Oryctes sahariensis Bruneau de Miré, 1960
44. Oryctes simiar Coquerel, 1852
45. Oryctes sjoestedti Kolbe, 1905
46. Oryctes tarandus (Olivier, 1789)
47. Oryctes vicinus Gahan, 1900
