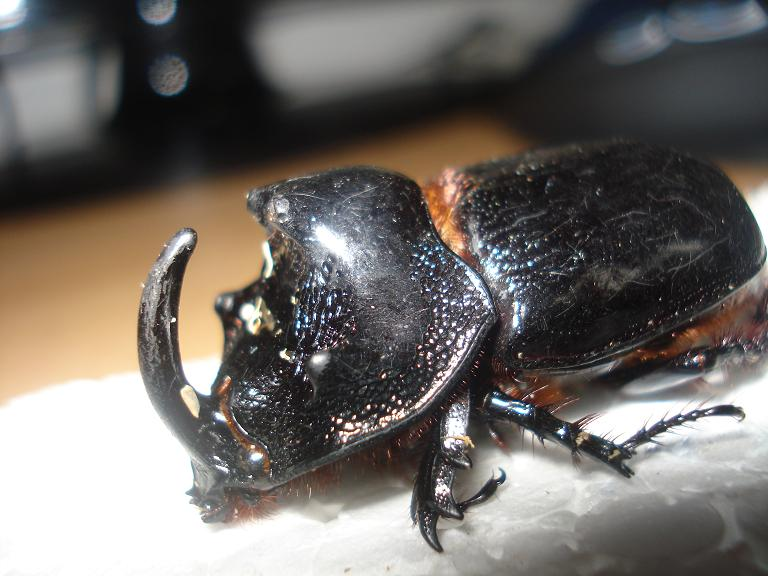
- Trichogomphus mongol

Scientific classification
- Kingdom: Animalia
- Phylum: Arthropoda
- Class: Insecta
- Order: Coleoptera
- Suborder: Polyphaga
- Infraorder: Scarabaeiformia
- Family: Scarabaeidae
- Subfamily: Dynastinae
- Tribe: Oryctini
- Genus: Trichogomphus; Burmeister, 1847

= Trichogomphus =

Genus of beetles

Trichogomphus is a genus of Asian beetles in the family Scarabaeidae and tribe Oryctini.

== Species ==
BioLib lists:

1. Trichogomphus acuticollis Arrow, 1908
2. Trichogomphus bronchus (Herbst, 1785)
  type species (as Scarabaeus milo Olivier, 1789)
3. Trichogomphus dechambrei Dupuis, 2003
4. Trichogomphus excavatus Mohnike, 1874
5. Trichogomphus galeatus Dechambre, 1996
6. Trichogomphus kobayashii Yamaya, 2002
7. Trichogomphus lunicollis Burmeister, 1847
8. Trichogomphus martabani (Guérin-Ménéville, 1834)
9. Trichogomphus mongol Arrow, 1908
10. Trichogomphus pistiloides Voirin, 1996
11. Trichogomphus quadridentatus Dechambre, 1981
12. Trichogomphus robustus Arrow, 1930
13. Trichogomphus rongi Dechambre & Drumont, 2002
14. Trichogomphus simson Snellen van Vollenhoven, 1864
15. Trichogomphus vicinus Dechambre, 1995
16. Trichogomphus zangi Sternberg, 1907
