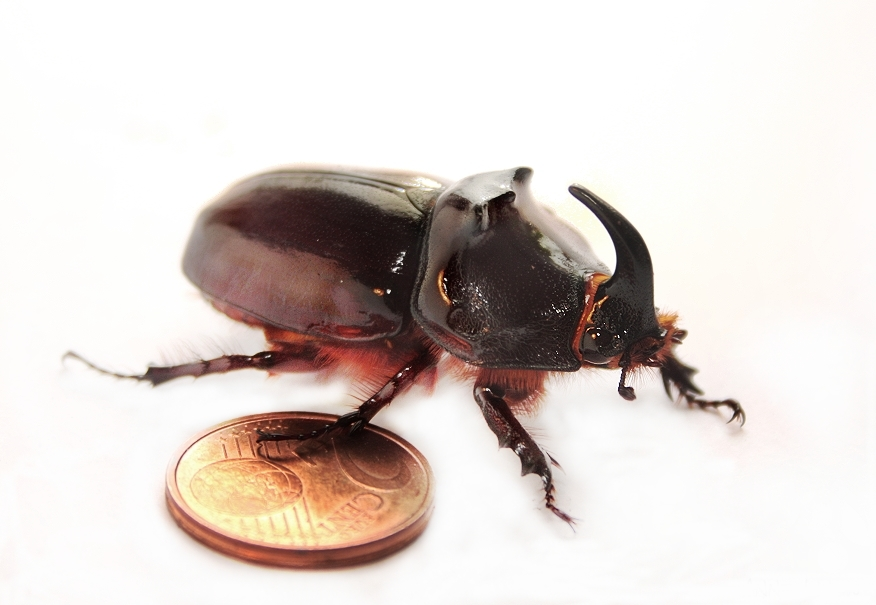
- Oryctes nasicornis

Scientific classification
- Kingdom: Animalia
- Phylum: Arthropoda
- Clade: Pancrustacea
- Class: Insecta
- Order: Coleoptera
- Suborder: Polyphaga
- Infraorder: Scarabaeiformia
- Family: Scarabaeidae
- Subfamily: Dynastinae
- Tribe: Oryctini; Mulsant, 1842

Synonyms
- Megaceridae HCC Burmeister, 1847; Megacerini Burmeister, 1847; Oryctésaires Mulsant, 1842; Strategidae HCC Burmeister, 1847; Strategini Burmeister, 1847

= Oryctini =

Tribe of beetles

Oryctini is a tribe of beetles in the Dynastinae (family Scarabaeidae).

This tribe perhaps best describes the term "rhinoceros beetles" and includes important pest species in the type genus Oryctes. However, the name may also be applied to genera in the Phileurini and related tribes.

Members of the tribe Oryctini are large, strongly build beetles with a thick cuticle. The adults are typically between 25 and 60 mm long and most often dark brown to black. The size and also the structures on the head and pronotum of males can depend on the suitability of the breeding medium where the larvae develop.

More specifically, the members of the tribe can be separated from other tribes of dynastid beetles by a combination of features. The most important ones are:

- They have an elongated body with the sides being nearly parallel, in contrast to more rounded forms in other tribes.
- Like in some other groups of dynastids, there is a clear difference between the morphology of males and females with males having more armoured structures on head and pronotum.
- The labial palps arise from the sides of the labium.
- The tibiae of the fore legs have a normal length, are not extended and are armed with three or four large teeth.
- The tibiae of the hind legs end in several processes, which can be teeth-like or finger-like.

Among the Dynastinae, the tribe Pentodontini is most similar to the Oryctini. However, both tribes can usually be separated by the tip of the tibiae on the hind legs.

The genera and species of Oryctini are widely distributed around the world but are especially common in the neotropical region. They often breed in decaying organic matter like rotting tree trunks or accumulations of compost. The adults feed on rotting fruits or tunnel into the stems of monocots like sugarcane or palm trees. They are active during the night and are often attracted by light.

== Genera ==
The following are included by BioLib:

1. Anomacaulus Fairmaire, 1878
2. Blabephorus Fairmaire, 1898
3. Calypsoryctes Howden, 1970
4. Ceratoryctoderus Arrow, 1908
5. Coelosis Hope, 1837
6. Clyster Arrow, 1908
7. Cyphonistes Burmeister, 1847
8. Dichodontus Burmeister, 1847
9. Dinoryctes Felsche, 1906
10. Enema Hope, 1837
11. Gibboryctes Endrödi, 1974
12. Heterogomphus Burmeister, 1847
13. Hispanioryctes Howden & Endrödy-Younga, 1978
14. Hoploryctoderus Prell, 1933
15. Irazua Ratcliffe, 2003
16. Licnostrategus Prell, 1933
17. Megaceras Hope, 1837
18. Megaceropsis Dechambre, 1976
19. Oryctes Hellwig, 1798
20. Podischnus Burmeister, 1847
21. Scapanes Burmeister, 1847
22. Strategus Kirby, 1828
23. Talautoclyster Yamaya, 2001
24. Tehuacania Endrödi, 1975
25. Trichogomphus Burmeister, 1847
26. Xenodorus Brême, 1844
27. Xyloryctes Hope, 1837
