= Heinrich Prell =

German zoologist (1888–1962)

Heinrich Bernward Prell (11 October 1888 – 25 April 1962) was a German zoologist.

== Biography ==
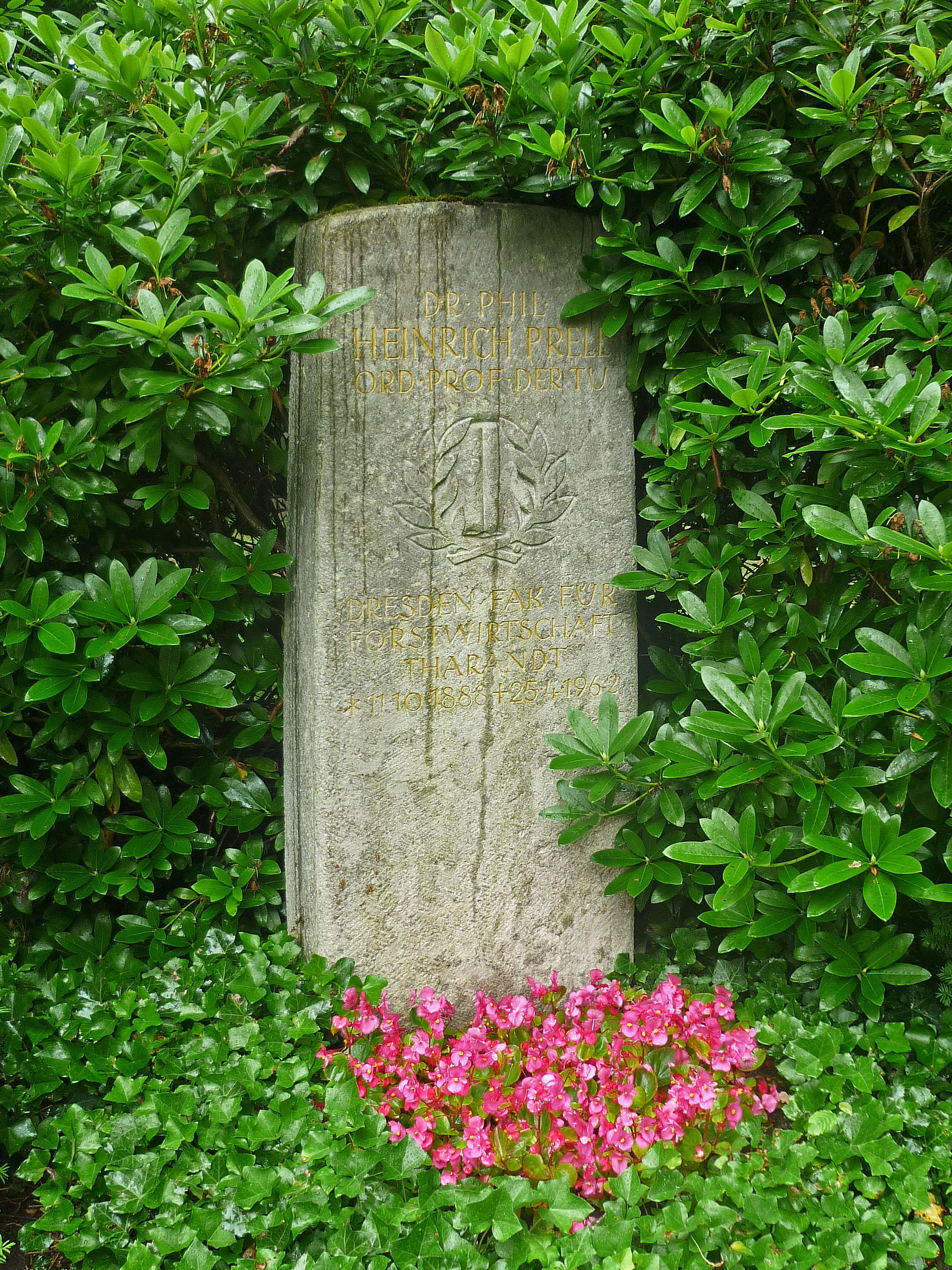
Heinrich Prell's grave in the Loschwitz Cemetery

Heinrich Prell came from a family of artists. His father Hermann Prell received a professorship at the Dresden Academy of Fine Arts in 1892. After graduating from high school in 1907, Prell studied medicine and natural sciences at the University of Freiburg, the Ludwig-Maximilians-Universität München, and Marburg University, specializing in zoology. After receiving his doctorate in Marburg in 1913, with a dissertation titled Das Chitinskelett von Eosentomon, ein Beitrag zur Morphologie des Insektenkörpers ("The chitinous skeleton of Eosentomon, a contribution to the morphology of the insect body"), he worked as an assistant to Karl Escherich at the Royal Saxon Academy of Forestry in Tharandt. After Escherich left Tharandt, Prell moved to the University of Tübingen with Friedrich Blochmann. In the summer of 1914, Prell presented his thesis "On the relationships between primary and secondary sexual characters in butterflies" and became a private lecturer in zoology and comparative anatomy. Among other things, he also gave lectures on fish science, fisheries and the history of the evolution of animals. After serving as a junior field doctor in the Wehrmacht's bacteriological laboratories during World War I, he was appointed associate professor at the University of Tübingen in 1919. In 1923 he accepted a position as full professor at the Forestry University of Tharandt. During this time he married the zoologist Adrienne Renée Koehler. From 1927 Prell was rector of the forestry college in Tharandt. By connecting to the Technische Hochschule Dresden in 1929 he saved the facility in Tharandt, which was threatened by austerity measures. In November 1933 he signed the commitment required of professors at the German universities and colleges to Adolf Hitler.

After the end of World War II, in addition to his duties in Tharandt, Prell took over the chair for general zoology in the mathematics and natural sciences faculty in Dresden until it was replaced in 1954. He also saved the Tharandt site again. In 1951 his scientific work was honored with a membership in the Saxon Academy of Sciences and Humanities in Leipzig. After retirement in 1957, he continued to hold the chair at the request of the faculty, despite several serious illnesses. During his career, Prell "co-edited the Zeitschrift für Parasitenkunde and published numerous treatises, in particular on applied zoology".

== Scientific fields of work ==
Prell's scientific work mainly involved entomology. He dealt with the morphology of protura and butterflies, with viral infections in forest pests, the silk moth (Bombyx mori) and the honey bee (Apis mellifera), with bee losses due to industrial exhaust gases and with gradations of the gray larch moth (Zeiraphera griseana) and the Nun (Lymantria monacha). He also dealt with fur animal science and was a member of the special committee for fur animal breeding of the German Agricultural Society in Berlin from 1927 to 1933 and became a member of the expert committee for fur animal breeding at the Reich Center for Fur Animal and Smoked Products Research in Leipzig in 1931. He also dealt with historical zoology, with the mating and gestation periods of some wild species (deer, brown bear, some species of marten) and with the influence of components of hut smoke on the hair loss of red deer.
