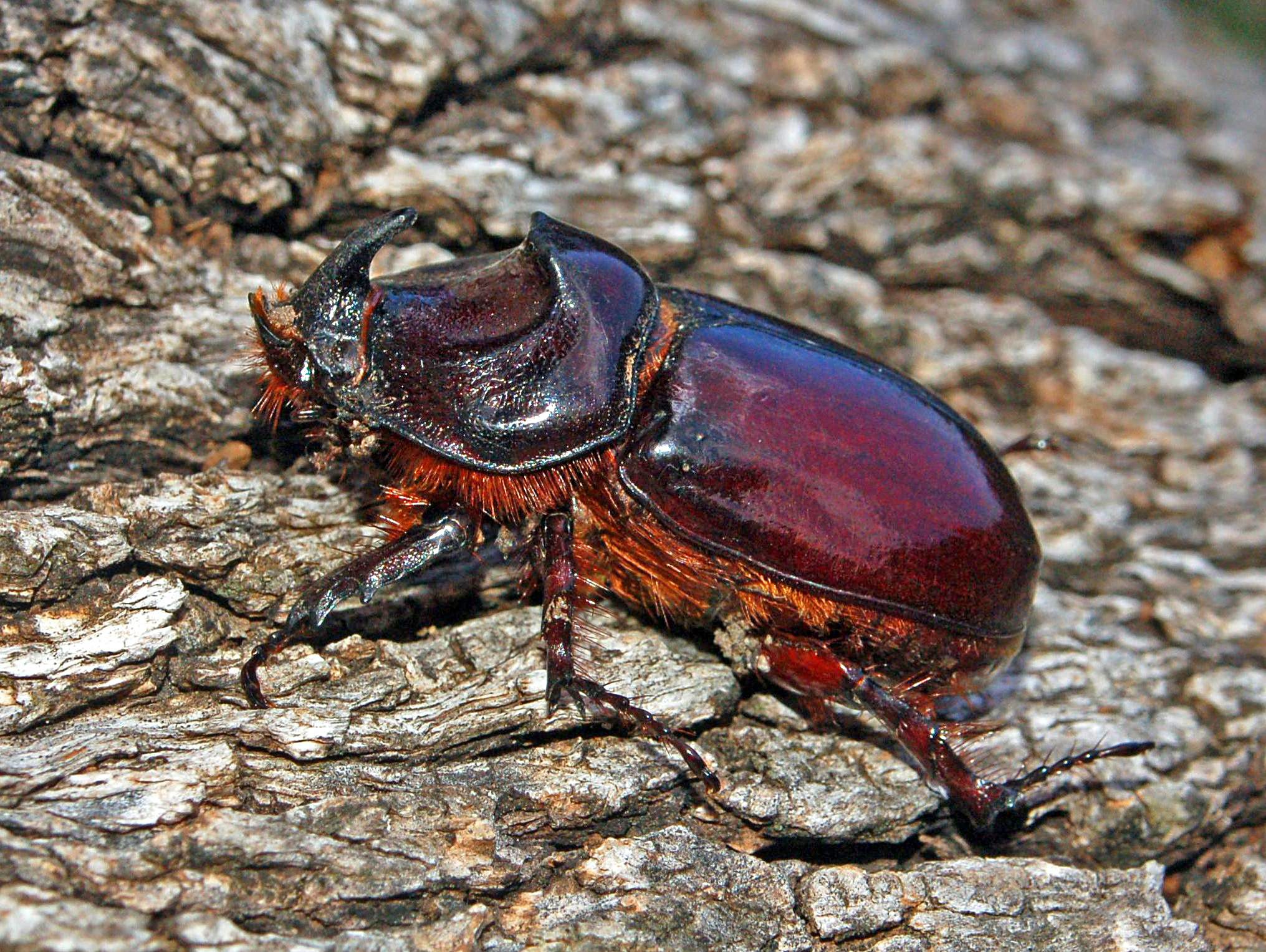
- Oryctes nasicornis. Male, side view
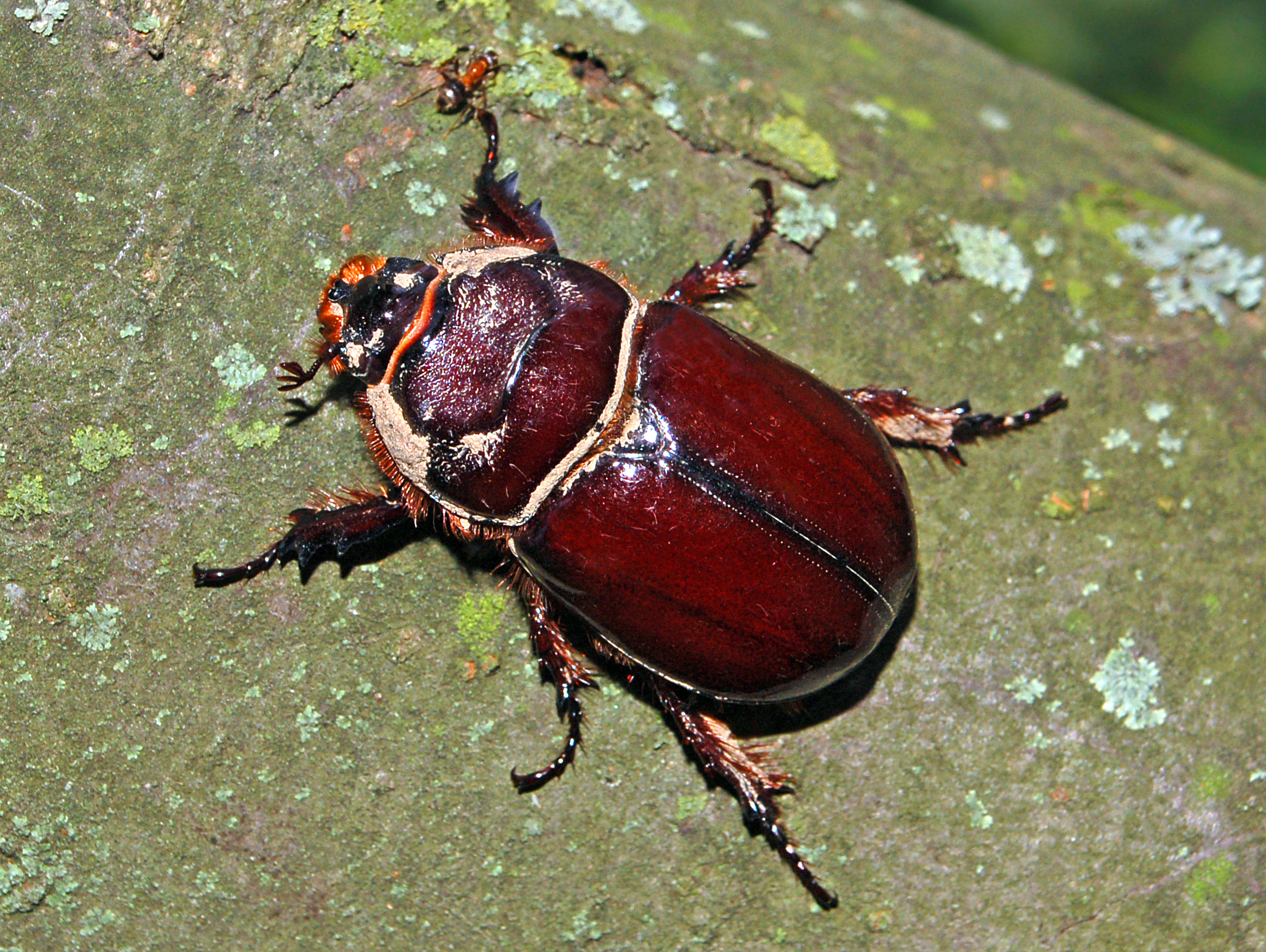
- Dorsal view

Scientific classification
- Kingdom: Animalia
- Phylum: Arthropoda
- Clade: Pancrustacea
- Class: Insecta
- Order: Coleoptera
- Suborder: Polyphaga
- Infraorder: Scarabaeiformia
- Family: Scarabaeidae
- Genus: Oryctes
- Species: O. nasicornis

Binomial name
- Oryctes nasicornis (Linnaeus, 1758)

= European rhinoceros beetle =

Species of beetle

The European rhinoceros beetle (Oryctes nasicornis) is a large flying beetle belonging to the subfamily Dynastinae.

== Subspecies ==
- Oryctes nasicornis afghanistanicus Endrödi, 1938
- Oryctes nasicornis chersonensis Minck, 1915
- Oryctes nasicornis corniculatus Villa & Villa, 1833
- Oryctes nasicornis edithae Endrödi, 1938
- Oryctes nasicornis grypus (Illiger, 1803)
- Oryctes nasicornis hindenburgi Minck, 1915
- Oryctes nasicornis holdhausi Minck, 1914
- Oryctes nasicornis illigeri Minck, 1915
- Oryctes nasicornis kuntzeni Minck, 1914
- Oryctes nasicornis latipennis Motschulsky, 1845
- Oryctes nasicornis mariei (Bourgin, 1949)
- Oryctes nasicornis nasicornis (Linnaeus, 1758)
- Oryctes nasicornis ondrejanus Minck, 1916
- Oryctes nasicornis polonicus Minck, 1916
- Oryctes nasicornis przevalskii Semenow & Medvedev, 1932
- Oryctes nasicornis punctipennis Motschulsky, 1860
- Oryctes nasicornis shiraticus Endrödi & Petrovitz, 1974
- Oryctes nasicornis transcaspicus Endrödi, 1938
- Oryctes nasicornis turkestanicus Minck, 1915

== Description ==
One of the largest beetles found in Europe, Oryctes nasicornis reach a length of 20–42 millimetres (3/4–1 3/4 inches), with a maximum of 47 mm (1 7/8 in). The elytra are reddish brown with a glazed appearance, while the head and pronotum are slightly darker. The underside of the body and the legs are covered with long red hair. It is a sexually dimorphic species. The male's head is topped by a long curved horn (hence its common name), while the females have no horns.

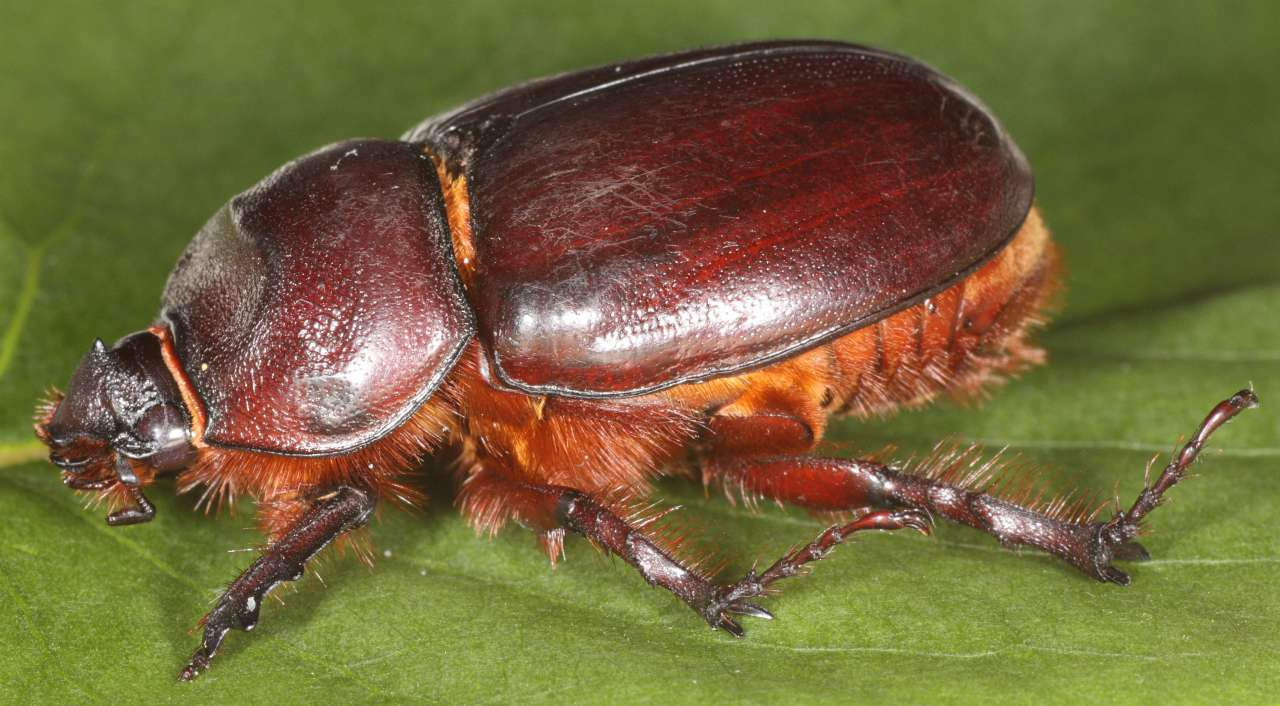
Female specimen

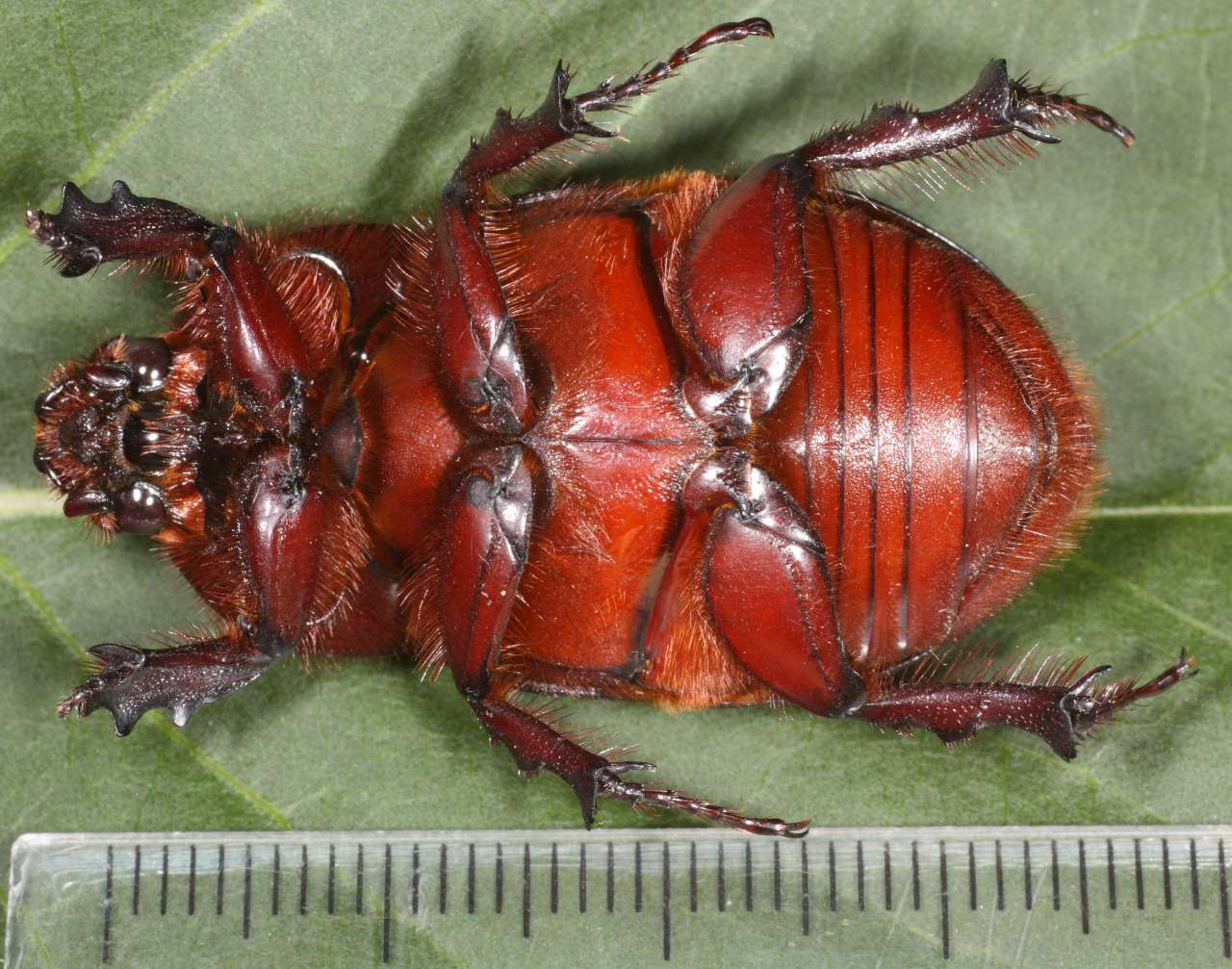
With metric ruler for scale

=== Life cycle ===
The larvae grow in decaying plants feeding on woody debris (xylophagy), generally non-resinous. They can reach a length of 60–100 mm (2 1/4–4 in). The development period lasts 2 to 4 years. The adult’s size is influenced by the quality and abundance of food.

The mammoth wasp Regiscolia maculata is a parasitoid of O. nasicornis larvae. The female wasp lays one egg inside the beetle larva; when the egg hatches, the wasp larva will feed on the host.

The adult beetle emerges between the end of March to May, and lives for a few months until autumn. It occurs mainly during the months of June and July and is very active, flying at dusk and by night, attracted by lights. In this stage they do not feed, consuming only the reserves accumulated during the larval stages.

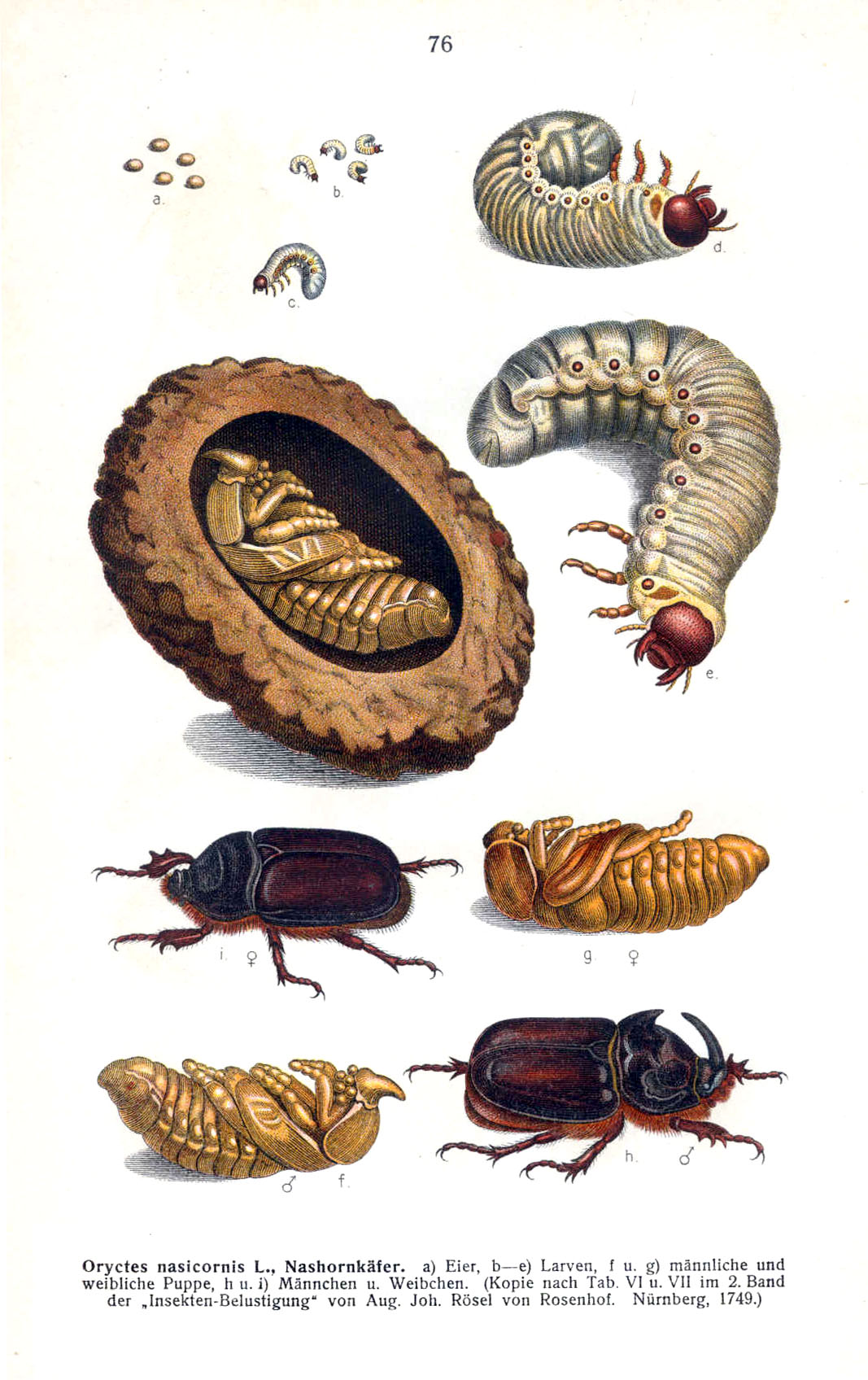
Illustration of life cycle

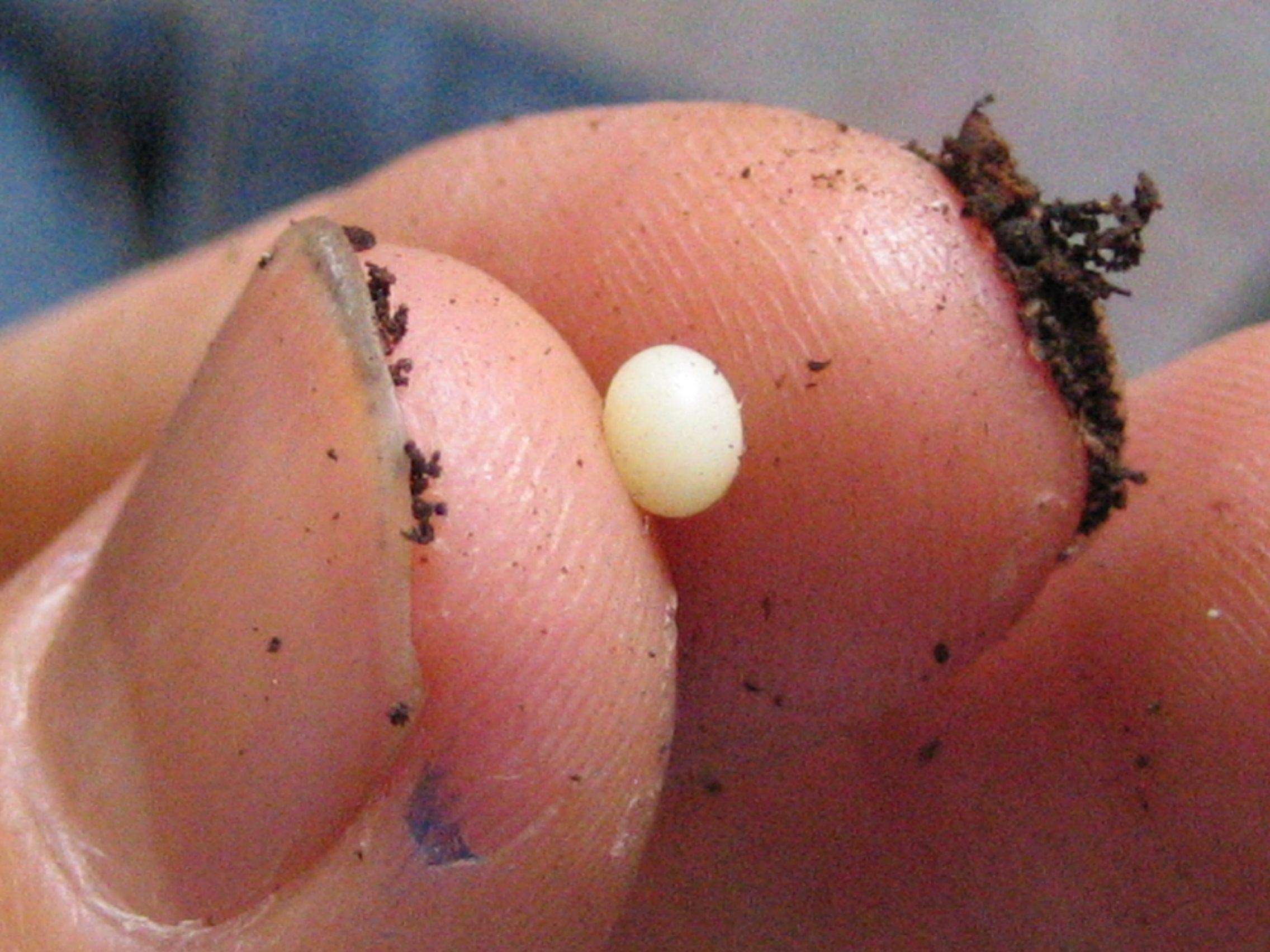
Egg

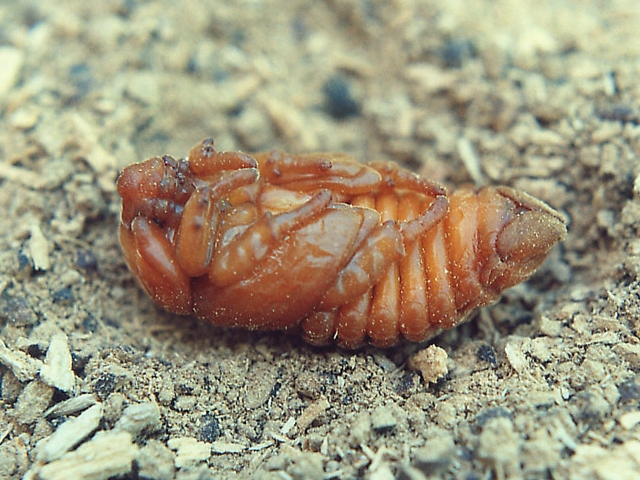
Pupa

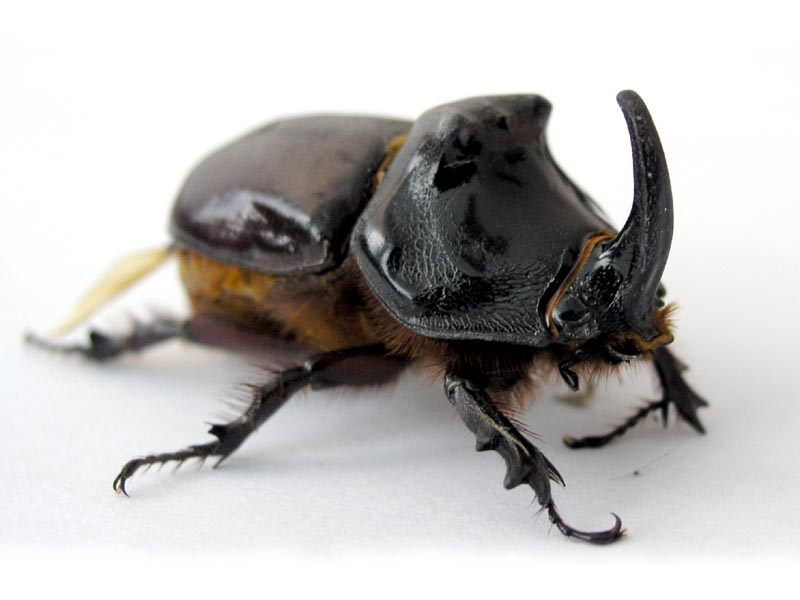
Adult

== Distribution and habitat ==
Oryctes nasicornis inhabits the Palaearctic region, excluding the British Isles. It is the only representative of the Dynastinae family found in Northern Europe. It is widespread in the Mediterranean basin up to Pakistan, the Near East and North Africa.

The rhinoceros beetle lives on wood, and the large larvae can be found in rotting wood stumps and around sawdust. At the margin of its distribution, the beetle is often found in connection with sawmills and horse racing tracks.

== In popular culture ==
This insect is well-known because Dim from A Bug's Life is a European rhinoceros beetle.
