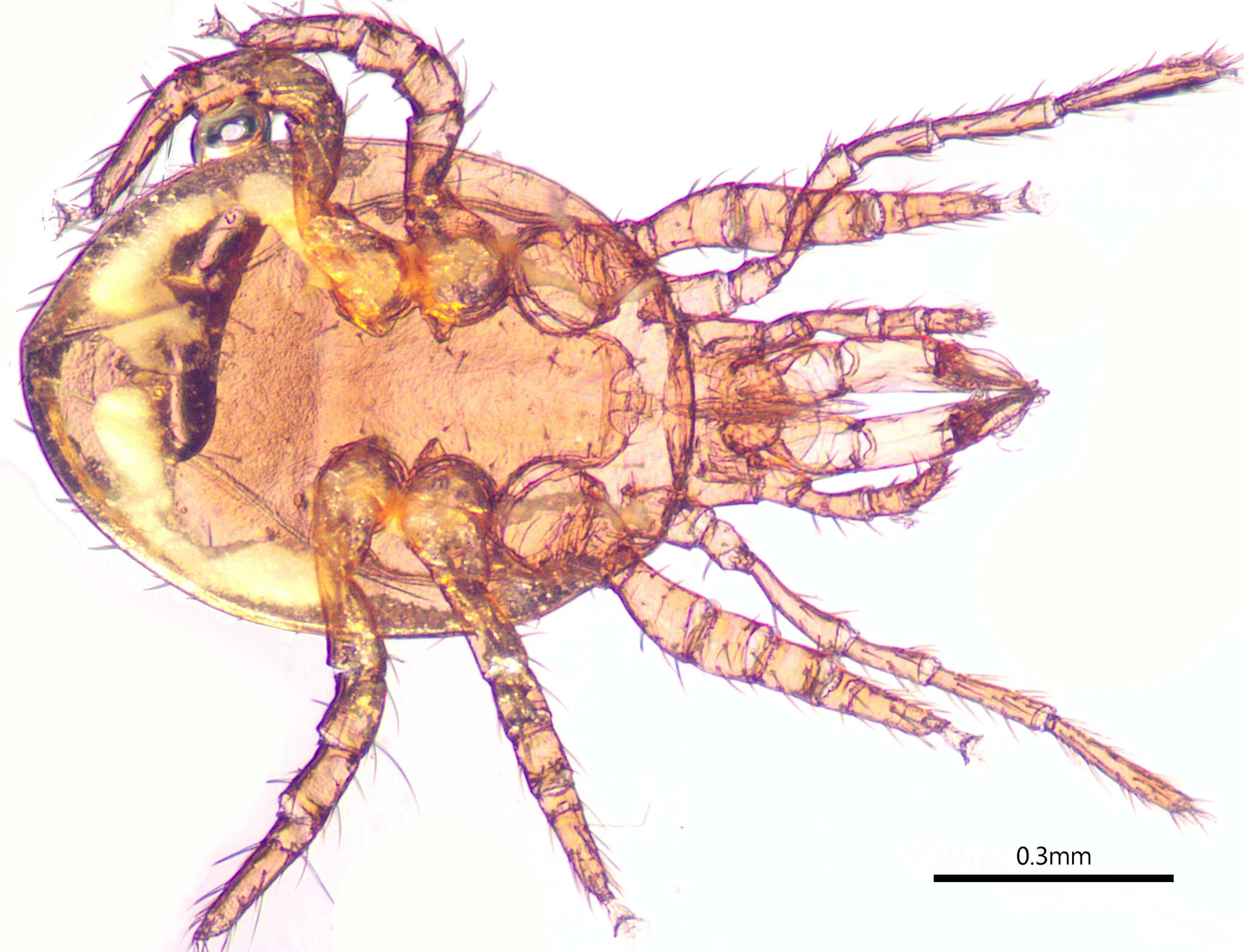
- Cryptometasternum queenslandense

Scientific classification
- Kingdom: Animalia
- Phylum: Arthropoda
- Subphylum: Chelicerata
- Class: Arachnida
- Order: Mesostigmata
- Superfamily: Celaenopsoidea
- Family: Diplogyniidae; Trägårdh, 1941

Genera
- See text

Diversity
- 40 genera, > 60 species

= Diplogyniidae =

Family of mites

Diplogyniidae is a family of parasitic mites belonging to the order Mesostigmata. Many are parasites on beetles but some live on larger animals (e.g., rats).

== Taxonomy ==
This is a list of the described species. The data is taken from Joel Hallan's Biology Catalog.

- Bilongicauda Elsen, 1975
  - Bilongicauda brevis Elsen, 1981 — host unspecified beetle; Ivory Coast
  - Bilongicauda gigantica Elsen, 1981 — host unspecified beetle; Congo: Kinshasa
  - Bilongicauda microseta Elsen, 1981 — host Didimus aloysi sabandiae (Coleoptera: Passalidae); Congo Kinshasa
  - Bilongicauda modesta Elsen, 1981 — host Pentalobus barbatus (Coleoptera: Passalidae); Congo Kinshasa
  - Bilongicauda triseta Elsen, 1981 — host unspecified beetle; Congo Kinshasa
- Bingervillia P. Elsen, 1981
  - Bingervillia hirsuta P. Elsen, 1981
- Burgeonium Elsen, 1975
  - Burgeonium latipecten Elsen, 1975
  - Burgeonium megabasis Elsen, 1981 — host Pentalobus simia (Coleoptera: Passalidae); Congo Kinshasa
  - Burgeonium prolongus Elsen, 1981 — host Coleoptera; Ivory Coast
  - Burgeonium retrolongus Elsen, 1981 — host Coleoptera; Ivory Coast
- Brachysternum Trägårdh, 1950
  - Brachysternum acuminatum Trägårdh, 1950
- Brachysternopsis P. E. Hunter, 1993
  - Brachysternopsis flechtmanni P. E. Hunter, 1993
- Ceratocelaenopsis Trägårdh, 1950
  - Ceratocelaenopsis womersleyi Trägårdh, 1950
- Cingulacarus Elsen, 1975
  - Cingulacarus gangeticus Elsen, 1975
- Crassoseta P. E. Hunter, 1993
  - Crassoseta cornutum (Hyatt, 1964)
  - Crassoseta fonsecai Hunter, 1993 — host Passalus coniferus (Coleoptera: Passalidae); Brazil
  - Crassoseta roseae Hunter, 1993 — host Passalus convexus; Brazil
  - Crassoseta starri P. E. Hunter, 1993
- Crenamargo Hicks, 1958
  - Crenamargo binuseta Hicks, 1958
- Cryptometasternum Trägårdh, 1950
  - Cryptometasternum aequalis Karg, 1997 — host Passalidae (Coleoptera); Irian Jaya
  - Cryptometasternum derricki Womersley, 1958
  - Cryptometasternum eboris Elsen, 1981 — host Coleoptera; Ivory Coast
  - Cryptometasternum natalense Trägårdh, 1950
  - Cryptometasternum queenslandense Womersley, 1958
- Diplogyniella Trägårdh, 1950
  - Diplogyniella gayi Womersley, 1958
  - Diplogyniella levinseni Trägårdh, 1950
- Diplogyniopsis Trägårdh, 1950
  - Diplogyniopsis fluctuosum Sun, Seeman, Jin & Yi, 2024
  - Diplogyniopsis multidentata Trägårdh, 1950
- Diplogynium G. Canestrini, 1888
  - Diplogynium acuminatum G. Canestrini, 1888
  - Diplogynium oryctae Vishnupriya & Mohanasundaram, 1988 — host Oryctes rhinoceros (Coleoptera: Dynastinae); India
- Discretoseta P. Elsen, 1981
  - Discretoseta cochlearia P. Elsen, 1981
- Eboriella P. Elsen, 1981
  - Eboriella globuloseta P. Elsen, 1981
- Forkosclerite A. Kumar-Datta, 1985
  - Forkosclerite assamensis A. Kumar-Datta, 1985
- Heveacarus Elsen, 1974
  - Heveacarus splendidus Elsen, 1974
- Heterodiplogynium Trägårdh, 1950
  - Heterodiplogynium vestitum Trägårdh, 1950
- Hirsutocapillus P. Elsen, 1981
  - Hirsutocapillus lukombensis P. Elsen, 1981
- Lobogyniella Krantz, 1958
  - Lobogyniella Trägårdhi Krantz, 1958
- Lobogynium Trägårdh, 1950
  - Lobogynium rotumdtum Trägårdh, 1950
- Brachylobogynium Bhattacharyya, 1969
  - Brachylobogynium setosum Bhattacharyya, 1969
- Lobogynoides Trägårdh, 1950
  - Lobogynoides andreinii (Berlese, 1909)
  - Lobogynoides obtusum Trägårdh, 1950
- Megachaetochela Trägårdh, 1950
  - Megachaetochela warreni Trägårdh, 1950
- Microdiplogynium Trägårdh, 1950
  - Microdiplogynium reticulatum Trägårdh, 1950
- Monodiplogynium Womersley, 1958
  - Monodiplogynium carabi Womersley, 1958
- Neolobogynium Hicks, 1957
  - Neolobogynium lateriseta Hicks, 1957
- Neodiplogynium Trägårdh, 1950
  - Neodiplogynium schubarti Trägårdh, 1950
  - Neodiplogynium eusetosum Karg, 1997 — New Caledonia
  - Neodiplogynium vallei Fox, 1959 — host is Rattus norvegicus (Brown rat); Puerto Rico
- Ophiocelaeno Johnston & Fain, 1964
  - Ophiocelaeno sellnicki Johnston & Fain, 1964
  - Ophiocelaeno sudhiri Kumar-Datta, 1985 — India
- Paradiplogynium Womersley, 1958
  - Paradiplogynium nahmani Seeman, 2007 — host is Titanolabis colossea
  - Paradiplogynium panesthia Womersley, 1958
- Passalacarus Pearse & Wharton, 1936
  - Passalacarus brooksi Womersley, 1958
- Pseudodiplogyniopsis P. Elsen, 1981
  - Pseudodiplogyniopsis garba P. Elsen, 1981
- Pseudofusio P. Elsen, 1981
  - Pseudofusio hulstaerti P. Elsen, 1981
  - Pseudofusio membranus Elsen, 1981 — host unspecified beetle; Ivory Coast
  - Pseudofusio microcorniculus Elsen, 1981 — host unspecified beetle; Ivory Coast
- Pyramidogynium Elsen, 1974
  - Pyramidogynium etataensis Elsen, 1974
- Quadristernoseta Elsen, 1975
  - Quadristernoseta schoutedeni Elsen, 1975
  - Quadristernoseta intermedia Elsen, 1981 — host Pentalobus barbatus (Coleoptera); Congo Kinshasa
  - Quadristernoseta longigynium Elsen, 1981 — host Tenebrionidae (Coleoptera); Congo Kinshasa
- Schizodiplogynium Trägårdh, 1950
  - Schizodiplogynium capillatum Trägårdh, 1950
- Spatulosternum Elsen, 1974
  - Spatulosternum microspinosus Elsen, 1974
- Trichodiplogynium Trägårdh, 1950
  - Trichodiplogynium hirsutum Trägårdh, 1950
  - Trichodiplogynium mesoamericanum Wisniewski & Hirschmann, 1993 — host Veturius platyrhinus (Coleoptera: Passalidae); Central America
- Tridiplogynium Trägårdh, 1950
  - Tridiplogynium inexpectatum Trägårdh, 1950
- Weiseronyssus Samsinak, 1962
  - Weiseronyssus mirus Samsinak, 1962
