= Neodiplogynium =

Scientific classification
- Domain: Eukaryota
- Kingdom: Animalia
- Phylum: Arthropoda
- Subphylum: Chelicerata
- Class: Arachnida
- Order: Mesostigmata
- Family: Diplogyniidae
- Genus: Neodiplogynium; Trägårdh, 1950

Species include
- Neodiplogynium eusetosum Neodiplogynium schubarti Neodiplogynium vallei

Genus of mites

Neodiplogynium is a genus of parasitic mites belonging to the family Diplogyniidae. Members of this genus can be distinguished from related mites by the sclerotized anal and ventral plates being completely separated.
