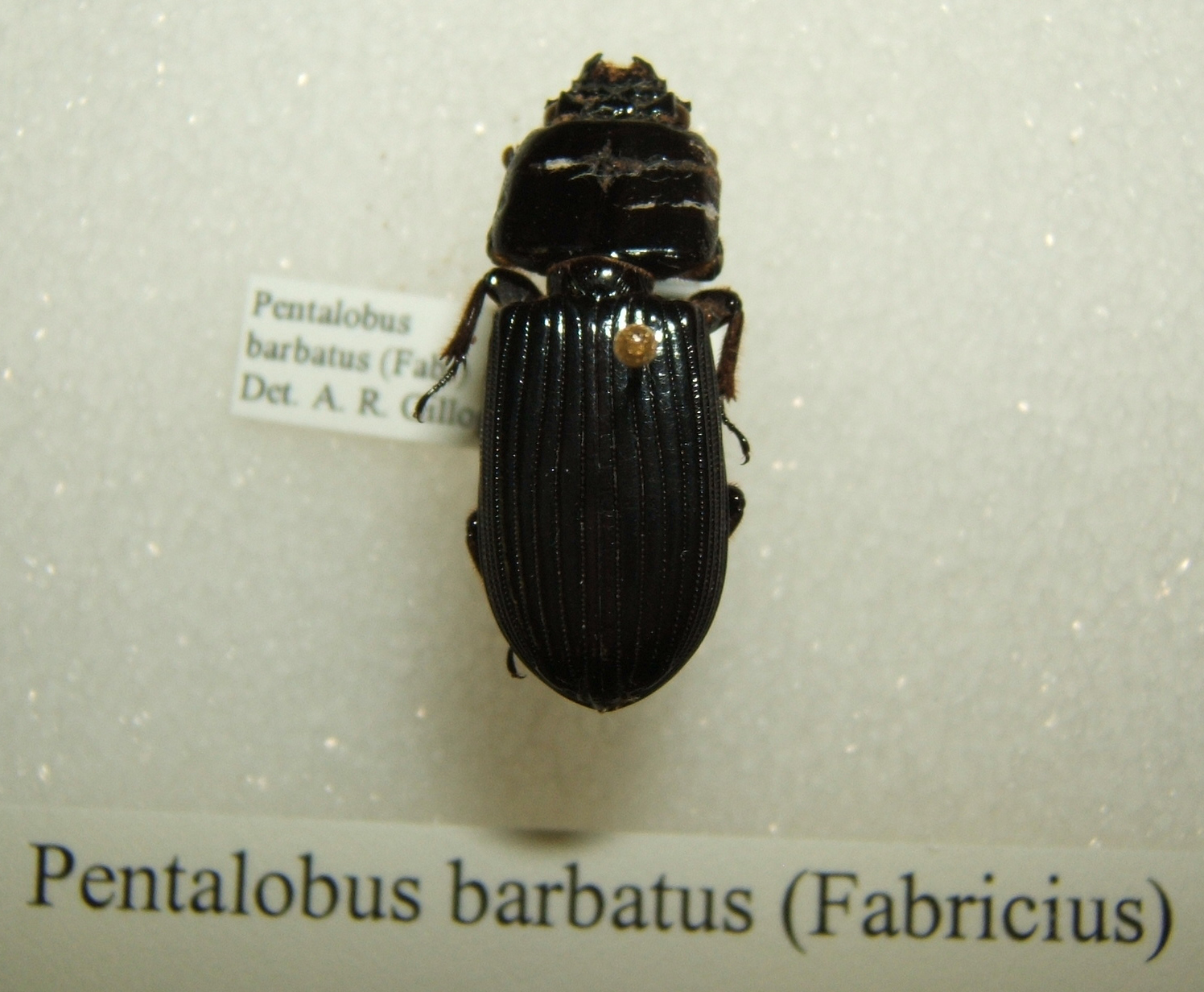
- Pentalobus barbatus, adult - type species

Scientific classification
- Kingdom: Animalia
- Phylum: Arthropoda
- Class: Insecta
- Order: Coleoptera
- Suborder: Polyphaga
- Infraorder: Scarabaeiformia
- Family: Passalidae
- Genus: Pentalobus; Kaup, 1868

Synonyms
- Epeus Kuwert, 1896

= Pentalobus =

Genus of beetles

Pentalobus is a genus of beetles in the family Passalidae.

== Species ==
- Pentalobus barbatus (Fabricius, 1801) - type species
- Pentalobus kaupi Boucher, 2005
- Pentalobus minimus Corella, 1941
- Pentalobus palinii (Percheron, 1844)
- Pentalobus savagei (Hope, 1844)
