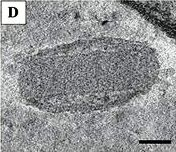
- particle of Oryctes rhinoceros nudivirus showing the capsid surrounded by a thick envelope (scale bar = 50 nm)

Virus classification
- (unranked): Virus
- Class: Naldaviricetes
- Order: Lefavirales
- Family: Nudiviridae
- Genus: Alphanudivirus
- Species: Alphanudivirus oryrhinocerotis

Member virus
- Oryctes rhinoceros nudivirus

Synonyms
- Rhabdionvirus oryctes; Oryctes rhinoceros virus; OrNV; OrV

= Oryctes rhinoceros nudivirus =

Alphanudivirus oryrhinocerotis

Virus and biocontrol agent of Oryctes rhinoceros

The Oryctes rhinoceros nudivirus (OrNV) is a member of the species Alphanudivirus oryrhinocerotis in the family Nudiviridae. It causes lethal infections in larvae and adults of the coconut rhinoceros beetle (Oryctes rhinoceros), a serious pest of coconut and oil palms in tropical Asia and the Pacific. The virus was discovered by Alois Huger in 1963 while searching for diseases of O. rhinoceros in Malaysia. It has been demonstrated to be an effective biological control agent against this beetle pest.

== Description and biology ==
The Oryctes rhinoceros nudivirus develops in the nuclei of infected cells, where the rod-shaped capsids are assembled to a size of 180 x 65 nm. Like in other nudiviruses, the capsids have a characteristic thread-like tail. They acquire an envelope and the final virus particles have a size of 220 x 120 nm.

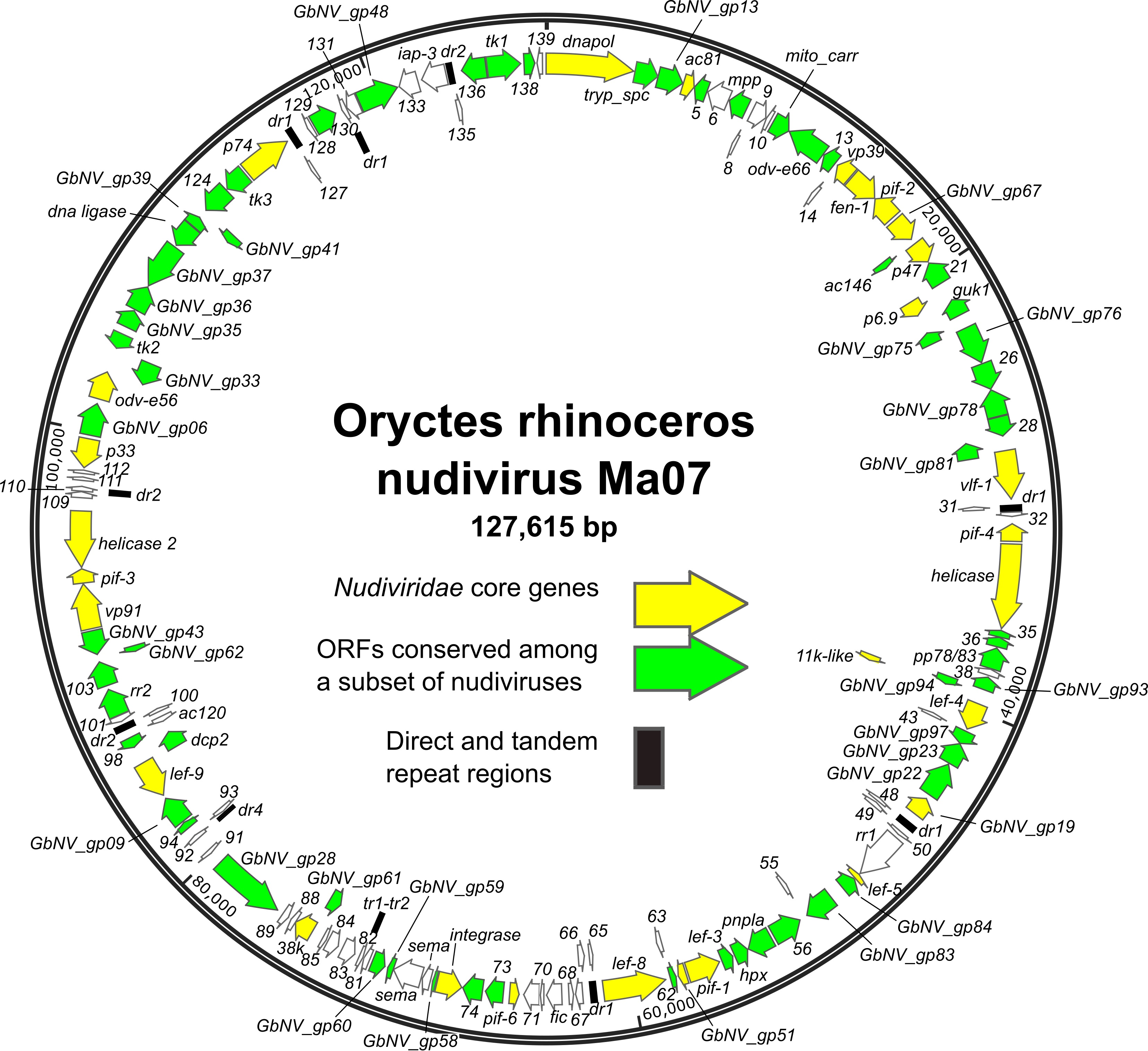
Genome map of Oryctes rhinoceros nudivirus (click on image to enlarge it)

The Oryctes rhinoceros nudivirus is a double-stranded DNA virus with a large circular DNA molecule. The example (representative) isolate Ma07 has 127,615 base pairs and 139 open reading frames. Among others, the genes are associated with DNA replication and virus structure.

The virus is transmitted perorally in O. rhinoceros larvae and adults. In O. rhinoceros larvae, the virus multiplies mainly in the fat body. As a result, the fat body disintegrates and the infected larvae have a transparent appearance. In O. rhinoceros adult beetles, the virus infects mainly the cells of the midgut. Midgut cells killed by the virus are discharged into the gut lumen. The gut becomes filled with virus particles and the infected adult beetles excrete the virus, transmitting it efficiently within the O. rhinoceros population. Transmission of the virus is important for maintaining it within the beetle population, since it does not persist for long outside its beetle host.

Infected third instar larvae typically die after around 3 weeks, 1st and 2nd instars earlier. Virus infections are, however, not transmitted to the pupal stage and adult beetles emerging from the pupae are always uninfected. They acquire infections through contact with infected larvae or adult beetles in breeding sites, or during mating and feeding in coconut palms. Virus infections reduce the lifespan and fecundity of the adult beetles. Infected females stop laying eggs and there is no transmission through the egg stage.

== Taxonomy ==
Alois Huger described the virus as being similar to viruses from the family Baculoviridae, but lacking the proteinaceous crystals which surround and protect baculovirus particles. He named it Rhabdionvirus oryctes, however it became subsequently mainly known as Oryctes rhinoceros virus (OrV). A genomic analysis in 2007 revealed similarities to another unassigned and non-occluded baculovirus, the Heliothis zea virus 1, but significant differences to other baculoviruses. Therefore, the new genus Nudivirus was proposed for both viruses within the Baculoviridae.

Further studies on the Oryctes rhinoceros nudivirus and other non-occluded baculoviruses led to the conclusion that they are significantly different from other members of the family Baculoviridae. Therefore, in 2012/2013, the creation of a new family, the Nudiviridae, was proposed with several new genera replacing the genus Nudivirus. The Oryctes rhinoceros nudivirus was regarded as the type species (now called 'example') for the first genus, the genus Alphanudivirus, and for the new family. Since the introduction of the binomial system in virus taxonomy, the species Alphanudivirus oryrhinocerotis is recognized with the Oryctes rhinoceros nudivirus belonging to this species.

== Prevalence and introduction ==
The Oryctes rhinoceros nudivirus has been found to be naturally present in Malaysia, Indonesia, the Philippines and India. It appears to be widely distributed in tropical parts of Asia, that is the native distribution range of its host, the coconut rhinoceros beetle. However, it was absent in the Pacific Islands invaded by O. rhinoceros and in the islands of the Maldives. Releases of the virus into virus-free islands resulted in a significant reduction of the beetle population.

The virus affects mainly the population of O. rhinoceros adults, spreading easily among adult beetles and reducing their lifespan and fecundity. In Samoa and the Maldives, where the virus was introduced, the infection rate among adult beetles was typically between 30 and 40% after its introduction, whereas the virus was only found in 10% or less of the larval breeding sites. In countries where the virus is naturally present (Philippines, Indonesia) the incidence of virus infections among adult beetles is also usually higher than the number of breeding sites containing the virus.

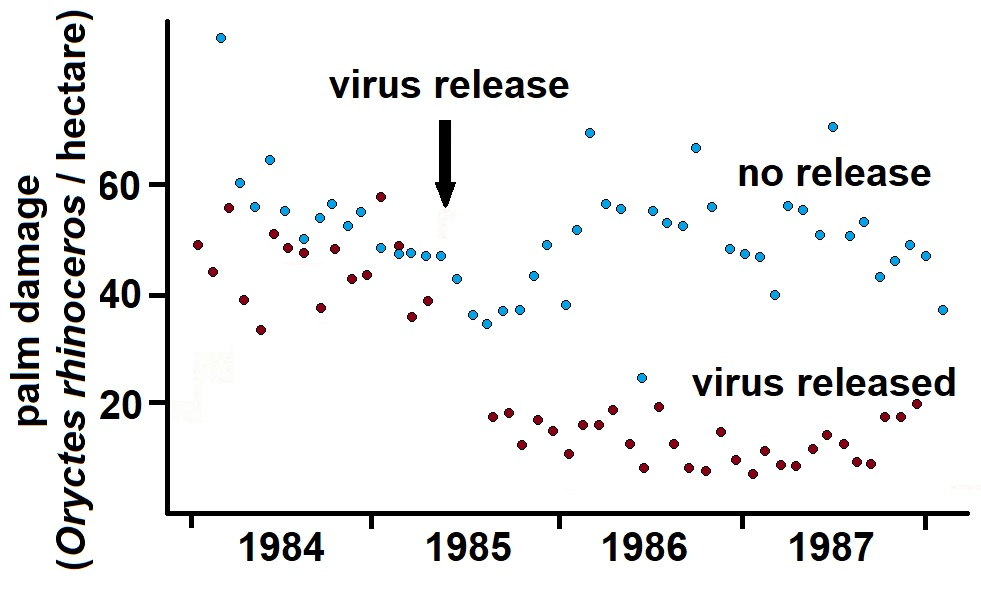
Effect of the introduction of the Oryctes rhinoceros nudivirus on the populations of Oryctes rhinoceros in the Maldives over 4 years. The damage on marked coconut palms has been converted into estimates of number of monthly O. rhinoceros attacks per hectare. Data from islands of Hukurudhoo Atoll (no virus release) are shown as blue dots, those from islands of Ari Atoll (virus released) as brown dots.

Comparing O.rhinoceros populations before and after the introduction of the virus in the Maldives as well as populations in the Philippines and in Indonesia with different levels of virus prevalence showed that the average lifespan of adult beetles was reduced to less than one half in populations with a high level of virus infections. This corresponds well to the reduced palm damage following the introduction of the virus. This reduction of palm damage was well documented in Samoa, American Samoa, Tonga and Fiji.

The palm damage depends on the density of palms, since the same number of O. rhinoceros adults per hectare will cause less damage in areas with a high palm density compared to areas with a low palm density. For accurate comparison of the effect of the virus on the O. rhinoceros population, it is therefore necessary to account for the density of the palms and convert the palm damage into an estimate of the number of feeding O. rhinoceros adults per hectare. In the Maldives, such a conversion showed that the introduction of the virus often reduced the number of O. rhinoceros adults attacking coconut palms to less than one quarter of the level before the release.

== Resistance to the virus ==
There is evidence that some O. rhinoceros populations have developed resistance to the Oryctes rhinoceros nudivirus. This is reflected in a natural low level of virus infections in some populations (e.g. South Sulawesi and Java in Indonesia), combined with a high level of palm damage, as well as high resistance to artificial virus inoculations in the invasive O. rhinoceros population in Guam. In Guam, the resistant population was found to belong to a specific haplotype (haplotype G) of O. rhinoceros which is also present in Indonesia, the Philippines, Palau, Papua New Guinea and the Solomon Islands.

At the same time it was shown in laboratory experiments that O. rhinoceros larvae and adults have different sensitivities to different strains of the virus. Virus releases with different strains in the Maldives supported these laboratory results. Therefore, resistance to the virus seems to be a combination of a general insensitivity to virus inoculations and differences in the virulence of different virus strains.

This was also supported by virus releases in coconut plantations in Central Java, Indonesia. In Java, the O. rhinoceros population was initially thought to be virus free, but was later found to have an extremely low level of natural virus infections, suggesting resistance to the virus. In 1976 and 1977, O. rhinoceros adult beetles infected with a virus strain from Sumatra were released in 8 locations in Java, while keeping 4 nearby locations untreated for comparison. Three years after the release, the palm damage in the treated areas had declined from 67.5% to 20.8%, expressed in % of fronds damaged. In the untreated areas the damage had not changed significantly (69.4% before and 76.5% after the release). Resurveying the treated and untreated areas in 1987, 10 years after the virus release, still showed a low damage level in the treated areas (17.1%) and some reduction in the untreated areas (41.8%).

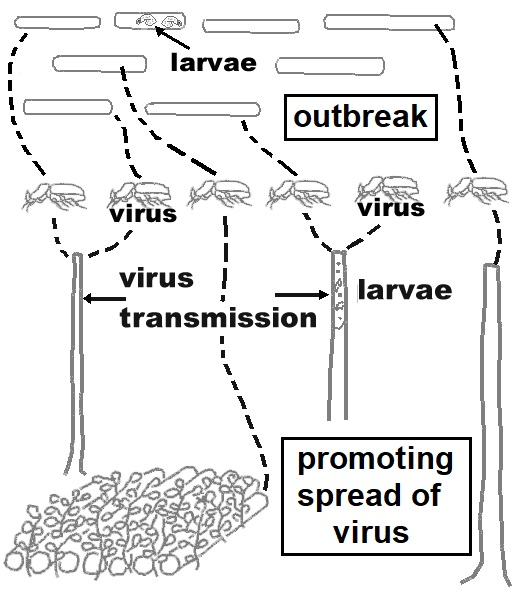
Disruption of the transmission of the Oryctes rhinoceros nudivirus during Oryctes rhinoceros outbreaks. The O. rhinoceros population is illustrated by 6 adult beetles, 2 of them infected with the virus. During replanting of a coconut plantation, many potential breeding places become available to O. rhinoceros and contact and virus transmission among adult beetles and between adults and larvae is reduced, resulting in an outbreak situation (upper part). The outbreak can be avoided/reduced by hiding the felled coconut trunks under covercrop and promoting the spread of the virus by a few dead standing palms per hectare (lower part).

== Ecology of the virus ==
Although the Oryctes rhinoceros nudivirus has been demonstrated to be able to suppress O. rhinoceros populations effectively, outbreaks by the beetle can still develop during replanting of coconut or oil palms, even in the presence of the virus. Under such conditions many breeding sites become available and transmission of the virus is often interrupted. Transmission of the virus occurs when infected adult beetles come in contact with healthy larvae and adults in breeding sites, apart from contact between adults in palm trees.

During replanting, when many breeding places become available, the contact between adults and larvae is reduced, because many potential breeding places are not yet occupied. Under such conditions it is advisable to hide the decaying coconut or oil palm trunks by planting cover crops around them. Cover crops not only hide the decaying palm trunks from the beetle, they also have a repellent effect on O. rhinoceros. In addition, the spread of the virus can be promoted by leaving a few dead standing coconut palms in the replanted area. Dead standing coconut palms are the most preferred breeding places, there is frequent contact between adult beetles and larvae in dead standing palms and they are hot spots for virus transmission. As pointed out above, other factors like the density of palms or resistance to the virus can also influence the ecology of the virus.
