= Alois M. Huger =

German insect pathologist (1928–2023)

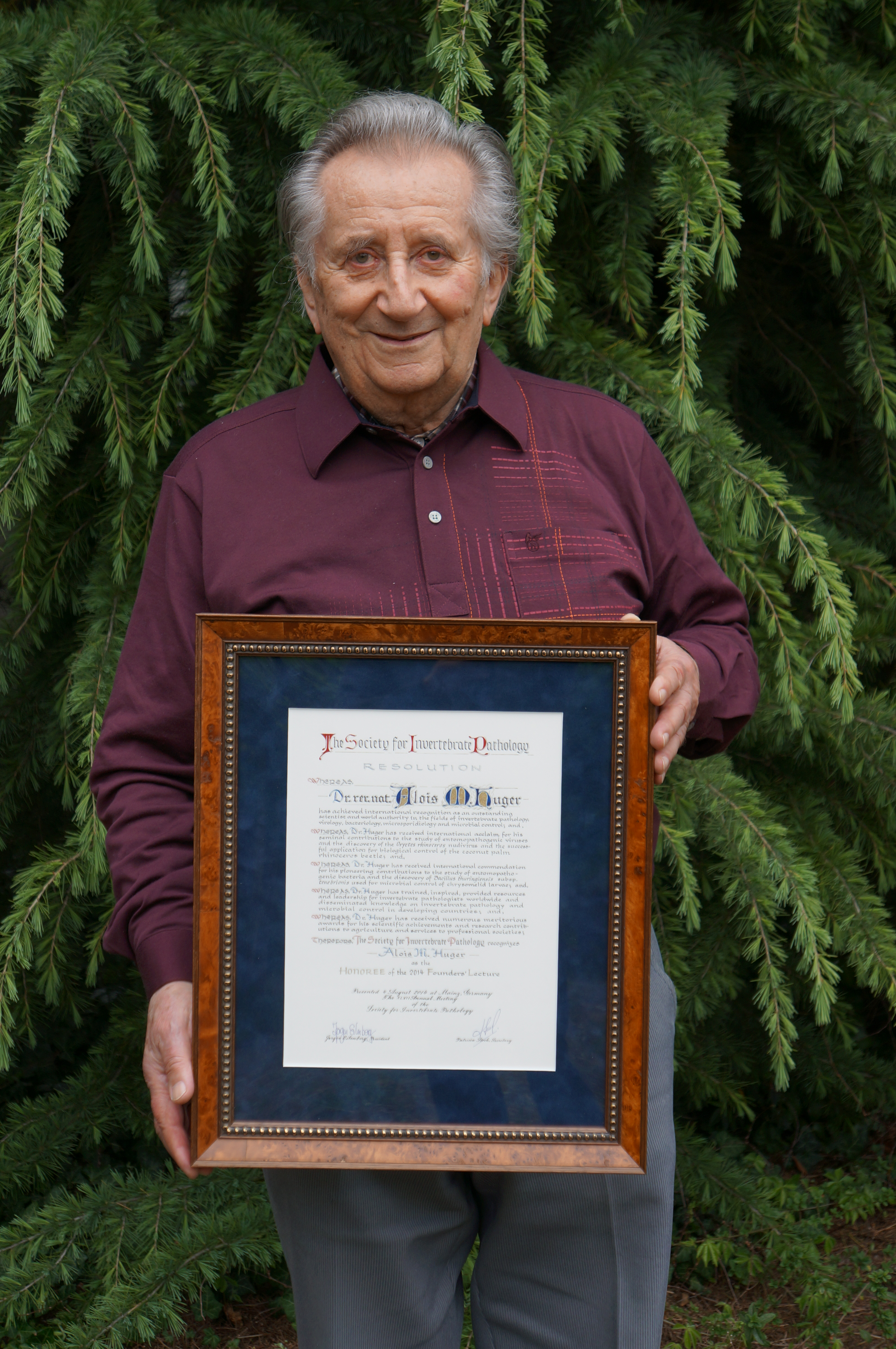
- Alois Huger in 2014 with Founders' Honoree award of the Society for Invertebrate Pathology
- Born: 23 June 1928; Pittersberg, Germany
- Died: 19 September 2023 (aged 95); Darmstadt, Germany
- Education: LMU Munich (Dr. rer. nat. 1956)
- Known for: Discovery of the Oryctes rhinoceros nudivirus and the Nudiviruses
- Spouse: Margot Schmidt (died 2006)
- Awards: Bundesverdienstkreuz (Order of Merit of the Federal Republic of Germany) (1989); Founders' Honoree award of the Society for Invertebrate Pathology (2014)
- Scientific career
- Fields: Insect pathology
- Workplaces: German Federal Research Centre for Cultivated Plants

Alois M. Huger (23 June 1928 – 19 September 2023) was a German entomologist and a pioneer in insect pathology as well as in the use of insect pathogens for the biological control of pest insects. He worked mainly on the diagnosis of insect diseases in Darmstadt, Germany. Among others, he discovered a virus disease of the coconut palm rhinoceros beetle (Oryctes rhinoceros) in Malaysia from a previously unknown group of viruses which provided long-term control of this pest when introduced into islands invaded by the beetle.

== Biography ==
Alois Huger was born on 23 June 1928 in Pittersberg, near Amberg in Bavaria, Germany. He studied at the Ludwig-Maximilians-Universität München (LMU) in Munich. One of his professors was Karl von Frisch, Nobel laureate who discovered how bees communicate among each other. His PhD thesis on the symbionts of stored product pests was supervised by Anton Koch.

In 1957, after completing his studies he joined the Institut für biologische Schädlingsbekämpfung, Biologische Bundesanstalt für Land- und Forstwirtschaft (Institute for Biological Pest Control, Federal Research Centre for Agriculture and Forestry) in Darmstadt, where he worked for his entire professional career.

His research focused mainly on insect diseases and he became an expert on a wide range of microorganisms causing such diseases, including microsporidia, bacteria, viruses and fungi. He was a founding member of the Society for Invertebrate Pathology and soon became well known in this field. His laboratory was specialized on identifying insect diseases and he was asked to diagnose disease outbreaks in insect cultures of research institutes and commercial companies. His work led to the discovery of various new disease agents, several of them of scientific and practical significance.

== Research highlights ==
One of his first research topics on insect diseases involved studies on microsporidia infecting insects. He was one of the first to study the morphology of these disease agents using an electron microscope. For example, his detailed morphological studies on the locust pathogen Nosema locustae (now called Antonospora locustae) helped to clarify the structure, function and life cycle of microsporidia spores.

Alois Huger studied various virus diseases of insects like a granulovirus causing lethal infections in the European fir budworm (Choristoneura murinana) which multiplies in the fat body of the insect. In 1963, during a mission in Malaysia to search for diseases of the coconut rhinoceros beetle (Oryctes rhinoceros), Alois Huger discovered a completely new type of insect virus. This beetle is an important pest of coconut palms and was introduced accidentally into Samoa from where it spread to other parts of the South Pacific. Electron microscopic images from O. rhinoceros larvae infected with this new virus showed virus particles similar to baculoviruses. However, the Oryctes virus lacked the proteinaceous crystals which surround and protect baculovirus particles. Huger named the new virus Rhabdionvirus oryctes. It is now called Oryctes rhinoceros nudivirus and belongs to the family Nudiviridae. In adult beetles, the virus multiplies mainly in the gut and infected beetles excrete virus particles continuously, transmitting the disease to healthy adults and to larvae in breeding sites.

The Oryctes virus turned out to be a very effective biological control agent of the rhinoceros beetle when introduced into virus-free beetle populations. Especially in adult populations, infections by the virus can exceed one third of the population and these epizootics result in significant declines of the palm damage. For example, the release of the virus into the islands of the Maldives, reduced the pest population considerably, often to less than a quarter of the level before the introduction.

Alois Huger also participated in the discovery of a strain of the bacterium Bacillus thuringiensis (Bt) which is now an important pathogen of leaf beetles from the family Chrysomelidae, including the notorious Colorado potato beetle (Leptinotarsa decemlineata). He first noticed highly unusual symptoms in diseased mealworm larvae (Tenebrio molitor) which turned out to be caused by a new type of Bacillus thuringiensis. He and his colleagues, named the new strain Bacillus thuringiensis var. tenebrionis. Unlike other Bt strains it infects exclusively beetles and this strain is now used in various biological control products which are active against leaf beetle pests. Other bacterial diseases studied by Alois Huger included the mysterious male-killing (or son-killing) trait in some insect groups like parasitic wasps. He helped to show that this trait is associated with bacteria which are transmitted by the females to their offspring during oviposition.

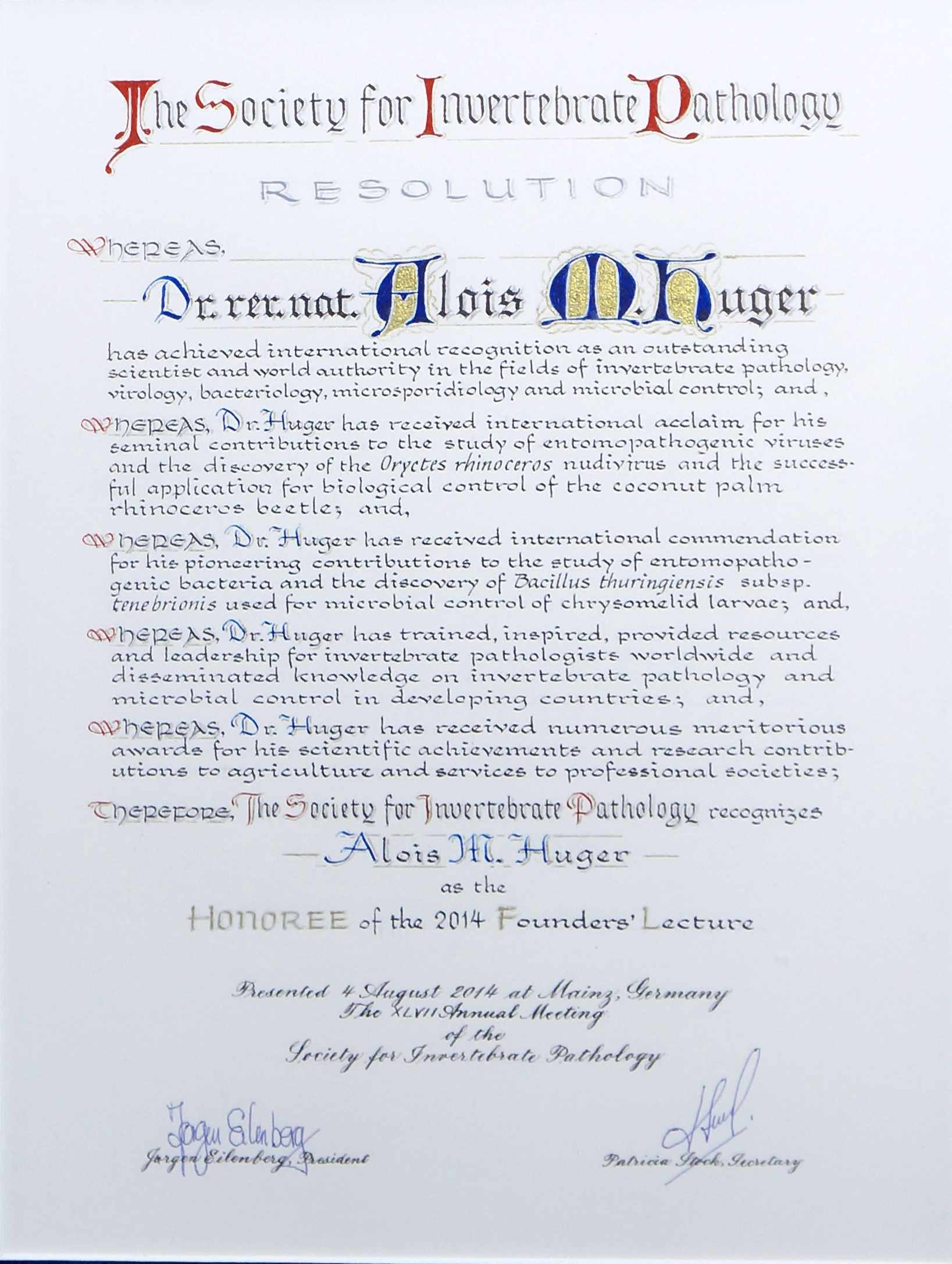
Award by the Society for Invertebrate Pathology (click to enlarge image)

=== Awards ===
- 1989 - Bundesverdienstkreuz (Order of Merit of the Federal Republic of Germany)
- 2014 - Founders' Honoree award of the Society for Invertebrate Pathology
