= Pentalobus kaupi =

Scientific classification
- Kingdom: Animalia
- Phylum: Arthropoda
- Class: Insecta
- Order: Coleoptera
- Suborder: Polyphaga
- Infraorder: Scarabaeiformia
- Family: Passalidae
- Genus: Pentalobus
- Species: P. kaupi

Binomial name
- Pentalobus kaupi Boucher, 2005

Species of beetle

Pentalobus kaupi is a beetle species of the genus Pentalobus of the family Passalidae. It occurs in São Tomé and Príncipe. The species was described in 2005.
