= Neodiplogynium vallei =

Scientific classification
- Domain: Eukaryota
- Kingdom: Animalia
- Phylum: Arthropoda
- Subphylum: Chelicerata
- Class: Arachnida
- Order: Mesostigmata
- Family: Diplogyniidae
- Genus: Neodiplogynium
- Species: N. vallei

Binomial name
- Neodiplogynium vallei Fox, 1959

Species of mite

Neodiplogynium vallei is a species of parasitic mite belonging to the family Diplogyniidae. This is an oval species with a length of around 3/4 mm. It is an ectoparasite found on brown rats (Rattus norvegicus) in Puerto Rico. It can be distinguished from its congeners by the presence of a sclerotized epigynal plate.
