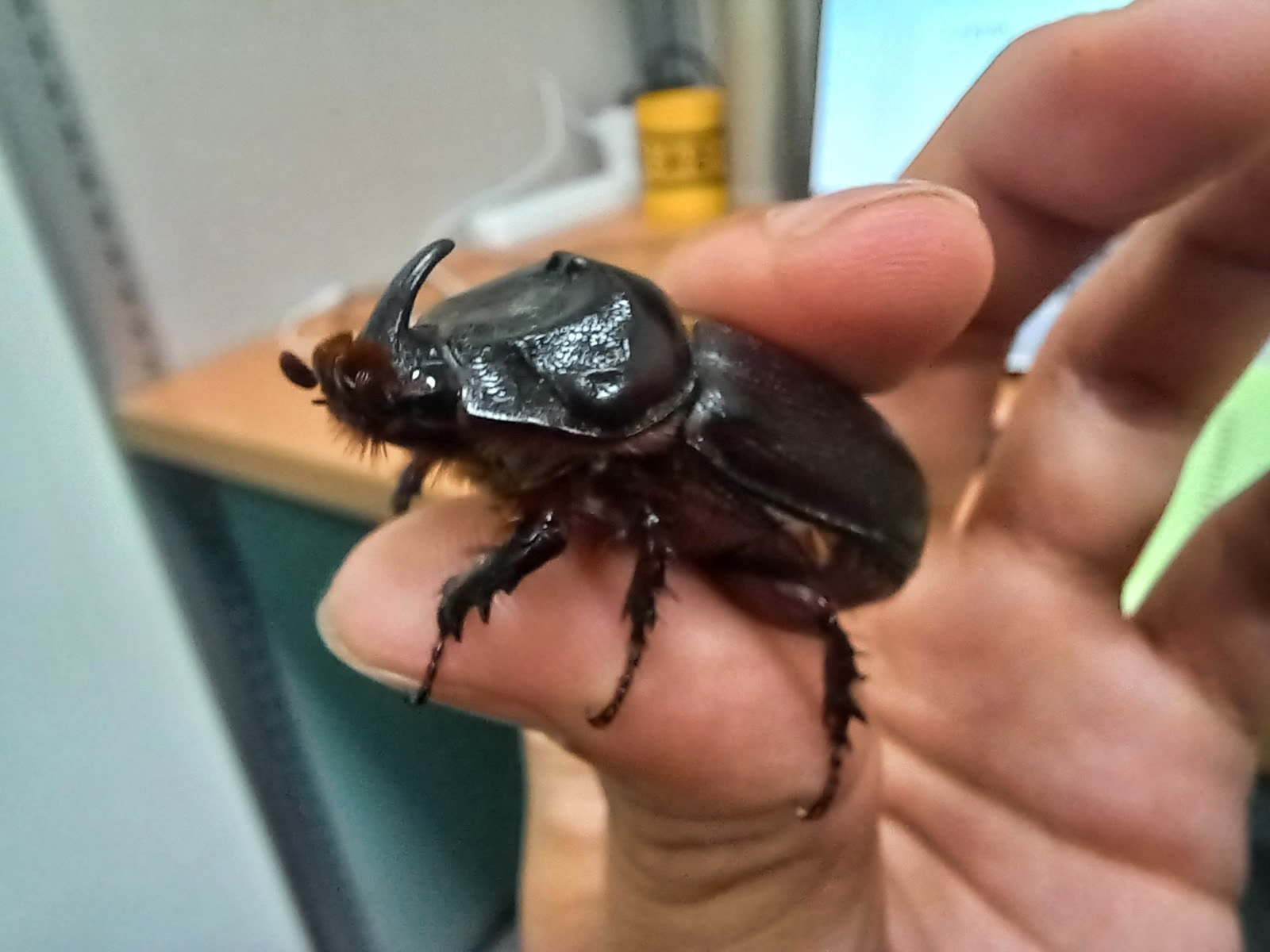
- Male Oryctes rhinoceros

Scientific classification
- Kingdom: Animalia
- Phylum: Arthropoda
- Clade: Pancrustacea
- Class: Insecta
- Order: Coleoptera
- Suborder: Polyphaga
- Infraorder: Scarabaeiformia
- Family: Scarabaeidae
- Subfamily: Dynastinae
- Tribe: Oryctini
- Genus: Oryctes
- Species: O. rhinoceros

Binomial name
- Oryctes rhinoceros (Linnaeus, 1758)

Synonyms
- Scarabaeus rhinoceros Linnaeus, 1758; Oryctes stentor Castelnau, 1840

= Oryctes rhinoceros =

Pest of coconut/oil palms in Asia/Pacific

Oryctes rhinoceros, also known as coconut rhinoceros beetle, Asiatic rhinoceros beetle, and coconut palm rhinoceros beetle, is a large species of beetle (typically 4–5 cm long), belonging to the rhinoceros beetles subfamily Dynastinae. Oryctes rhinoceros attacks coconut palms and other palms such as the economically important oil palm. It can cause serious damage to the developing fronds (leaves) up to death of the palm. The beetle breeds in decaying palm trunks or other organic matter like sawdust or compost heaps.

== Distribution ==
The native distribution of this beetle covers most parts of tropical Asia, from India and the Maldives in the west to countries like Myanmar, Thailand, Malaysia, Vietnam, most parts of Indonesia, the Philippines, Taiwan and southern China in the east. Through human activity, it has been accidentally introduced into a larger number of tropical islands in the Pacific starting with Samoa where larvae arrived in 1909 with the soil of rubber seedlings from Ceylon (Sri Lanka). From Samoa, the coconut rhinoceros beetle spread to many others parts of the Pacific. Its distribution range also expanded to several islands in the Indian Ocean, in the Western Pacific, e.g. to Palau and New Britain, and most recently, the beetle invaded Guam, Hawaii, the Solomon Islands and Vanuatu.

== Description ==
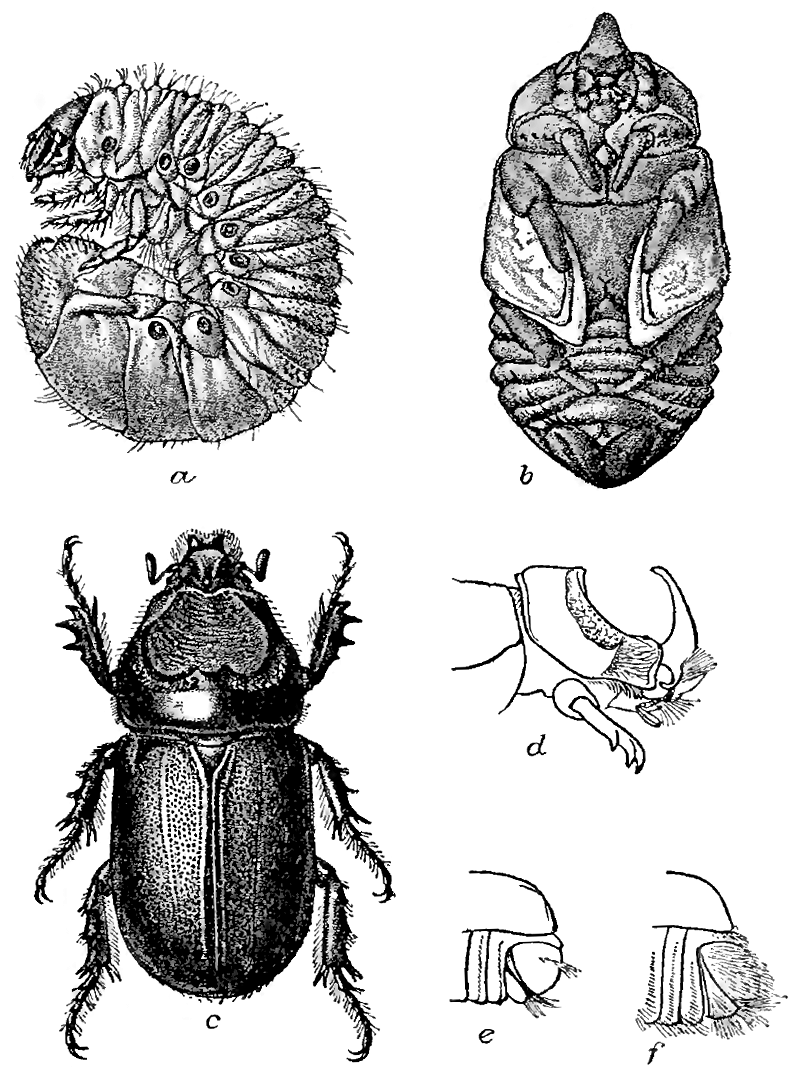
Oryctes rhinoceros larva and pupa (top row), adult male dorsal view (bottom left), bottom right: profile of male head and thorax (top) and end of abdomen (bottom) of male (e) and female (f)

Oryctes rhinoceros is a large dynastid beetle with a length of 35–50 mm and a dark-brown to black colour. The head has a horn which is more prominently developed in males and in larger specimens. The pronotum has a large central depression with two humps at the hind margin and the tibia of the foreleg has three large teeth. Male beetles can be reliably distinguished from females by the tip of the abdomen which is rounded, shiny and hairless in males. In females the tip is more pointed and densely covered with hair.

The eggs are white and about 3 mm in diameter. The larvae are the typical C-shaped white grubs of scarab beetles. The three larval stages can be separated by the size of their head capsule which is around 2.5–3 mm (first instar), 5–6 mm (second instar) and 10–11 mm (third instar), respectively.

== Biology and life cycle ==
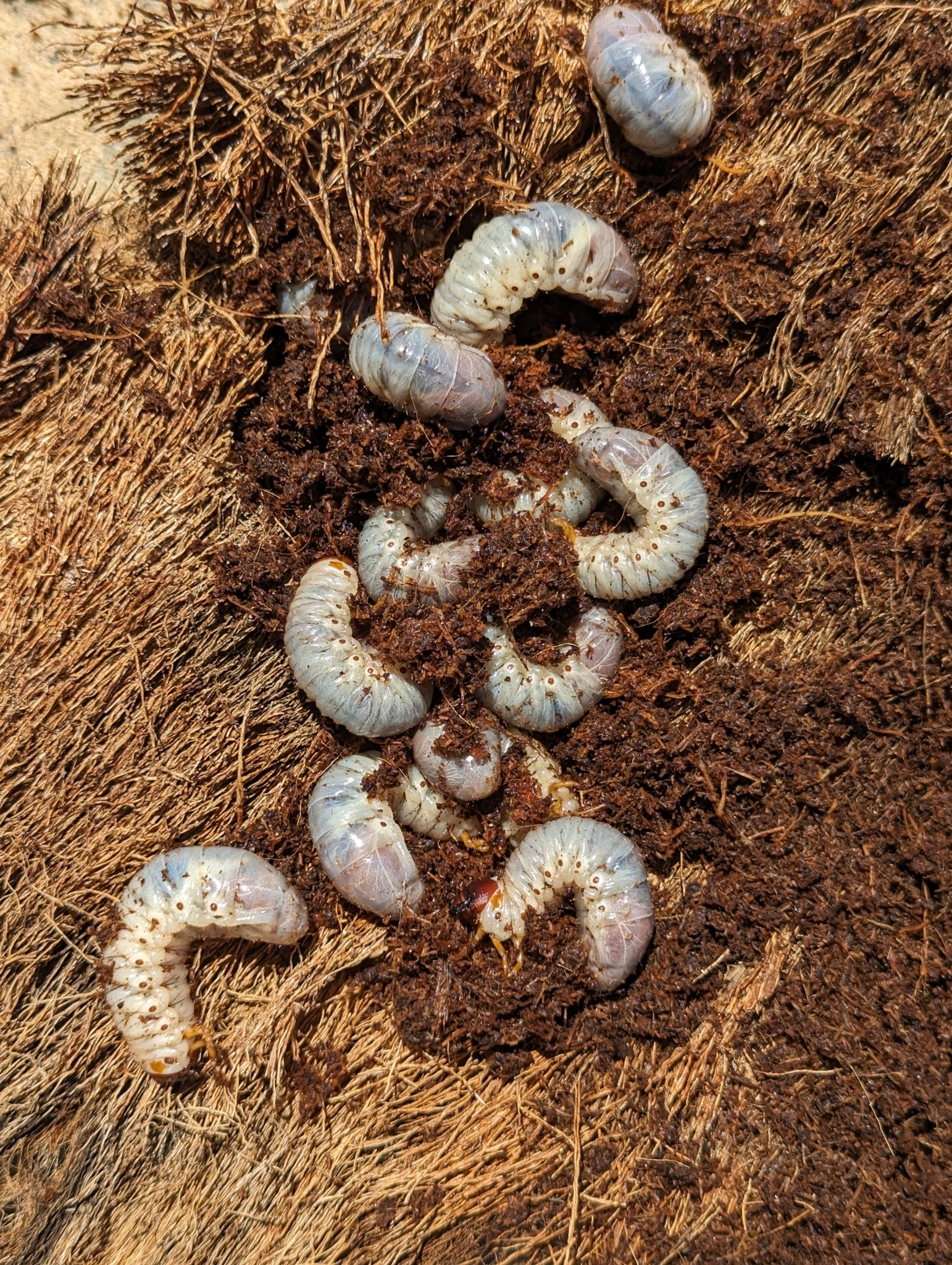
Group of third instar larvae of Oryctes rhinoceros in a decaying coconut trunk

The coconut rhinoceros beetle is nocturnal and flies only during the night. Its main host is the coconut palm, but other palms, especially the economically important African oil palm are also hosts. Attacks are occasionally also reported from various other crops like banana plants or screw palms.

The beetle most often breeds in the decaying trunks of coconut or oil palm. These trunks become suitable for breeding after palms are felled for replanting or when the palm dies of old age. The dead standing palms are the most preferred breeding places. Other breeding sites are sawdust heaps around sawmills, compost heaps in gardens, stumps of rubber trees, and other decaying organic matter such as heaps of cocoa (cacao) pods. The breeding substrate must have reached a certain degree of decay for the females to accept it.

Female beetles typically arrive first at a decaying coconut trunk for breeding and start preparing the trunk for egg laying by breaking up the wood into small particles, suitable for consumption by the freshly hatched first instar larvae. A male beetle often follows the female for mating and to help the female with preparation of the breeding site. Females deposit eggs, packing the wood particles tightly around the eggs. Males often stay behind in the trunk, breaking up additional wood.

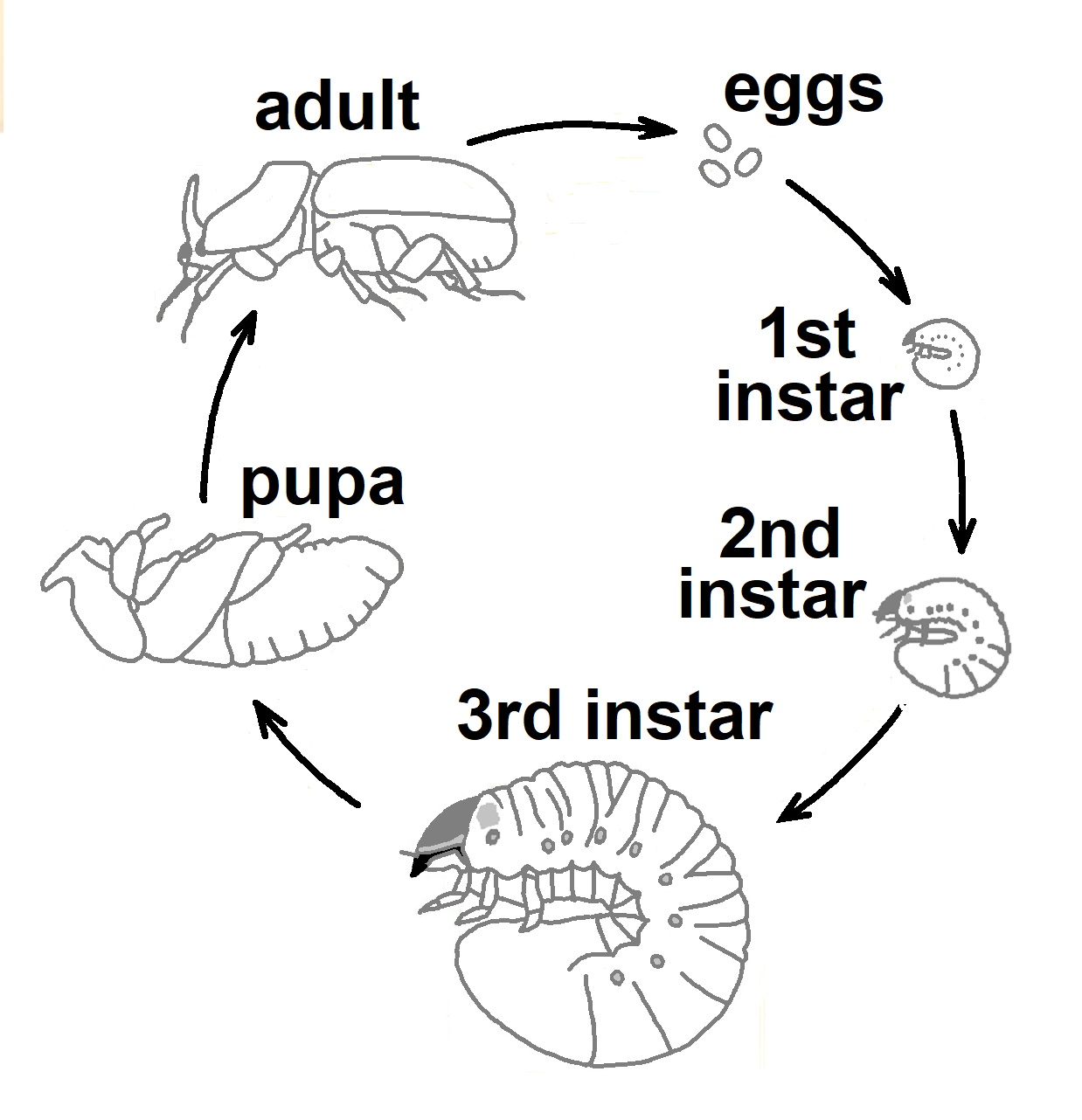
Illustration of life cycle of Oryctes rhinoceros with egg, 3 larval stages (instars) and pupa spent in decaying coconut trunks or other decaying organic matter, and adult stage spent in live coconut or oil palms

The eggs hatch after 1.5–2 weeks and under favourable conditions, the three larval stages are completed after 1.5–2 weeks (first instar), 2–3 weeks (second instar) and 13–17 weeks (third instar). This adds up to around 22 weeks or 5 months for the average duration of the egg and three larval stages under favourable conditions. However, the development of the larvae can be significantly delayed by unsuitable conditions like low temperatures or a sub optimal breeding substrate.

The young adults emerge from the pupae after around three weeks. They remain at the breeding site for an additional three to four weeks until their cuticle is hardened and their flight muscles and reproductive organs are fully developed. They then leave the breeding site and fly to a nearby coconut palm, where they feed and mate. Breeding starts after the first feeding, only two to three weeks after the young adults have emerged from the breeding site. Therefore, the total duration of one generation (egg to egg) adds up to around seven months under favourable conditions. Adult beetles live up to six months and during this period they attack palm trees, mate and lay eggs several times. During its lifetime, one female can lay up to 150 eggs with a typical total average of 90–100 eggs per female.

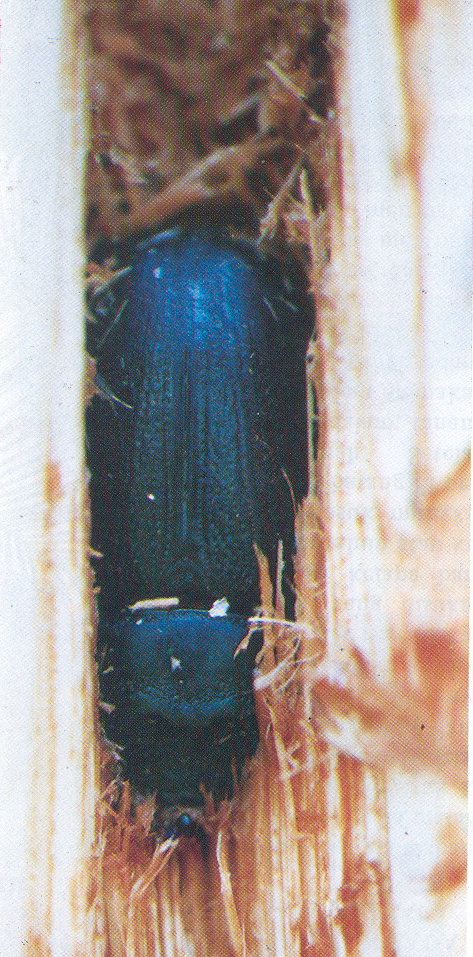
Oryctes rhinoceros feeding in the heart of a young coconut palm (Indonesia)

== Damage and economic losses ==
The coconut rhinoceros beetle attacks a palm at the base of the fronds (leaves) where they are attached to the growing trunk. They start at one of the middle leaf axils, boring through the base of other fronds into the centre of the crown, the palm heart, where the young, still white fronds develop. The beetle feeds on the undeveloped fronds, causing major damage to the palm. While the damaged fronds still continue to grow, become green and unfold, they typically have parts cut off. Most often the damaged fronds show triangular cuts, or when the fronds unfold, parts break off and wilt.

Attacks by Oryctes rhinoceros on coconut palms can affect the palms in two different ways. The reduction in leaf area on the damaged fronds results in a reduction of the number of nuts produced, and in newly planted palms the beetle can destroy the growing point of the palm resulting in its death. Mature palms may also die after extremely heavy attacks.

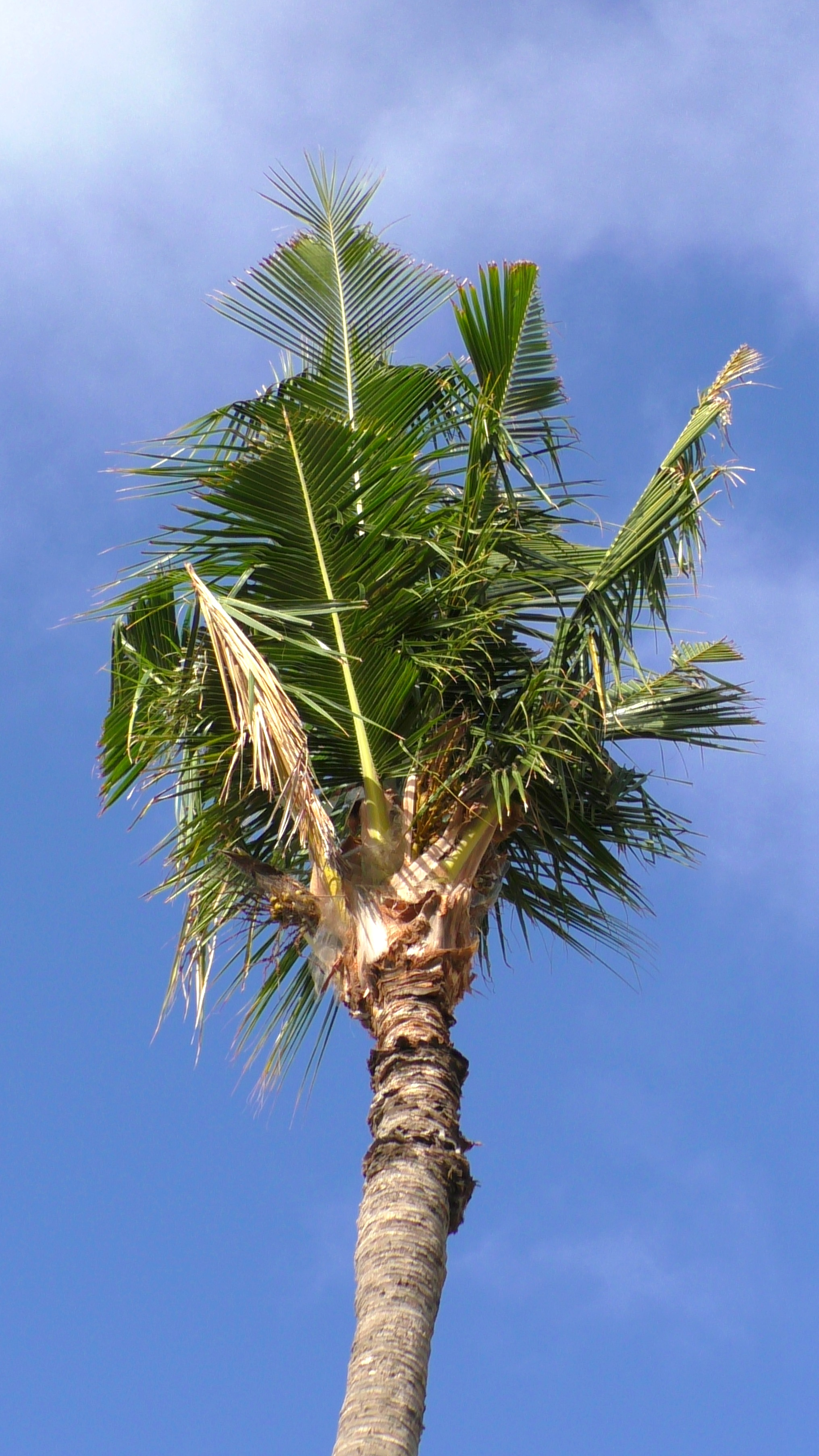
Coconut palm in Hawaii, heavily damaged by Oryctes rhinoceros attacks.

There have been few studies on quantifying the economic losses caused by O. rhinoceros to coconut palms, but the following costs and effects are generally attributed to the presence of the beetle in invaded areas:

- Reduction of coconut yield due to O. rhinoceros attacks, resulting in lower production of copra, desiccated coconut or young nuts for fresh consumption.
- Costs for quarantine or control operations like removal of breeding sites.
- Costs of replanting young palms killed by O. rhinoceros attacks.
- Environmental damage like the destruction of native palm species or changes to the coastal vegetation.
- Costs of converting heavily damaged and unproductive plantations of mature (bearing) coconut palms into other uses.

After spreading to a new island, damage by O. rhinoceros is often particularly serious. In the Palau Islands, the beetle was reported to have killed about half of all palms within 10 years of its introduction, and on the island of Diego Garcia up to one third of the young trees needed to be replanted after being killed during beetle attacks in newly planted coconut plantations. Substantial resources are often allocated to O. rhinoceros quarantine and control operations. For example, in Hawaii the budget for fiscal 2025 provides support for the control of 6 specific invasive species with the largest amount ($ 2.4 million) being allocated to the fight against the coconut rhinoceros beetle.

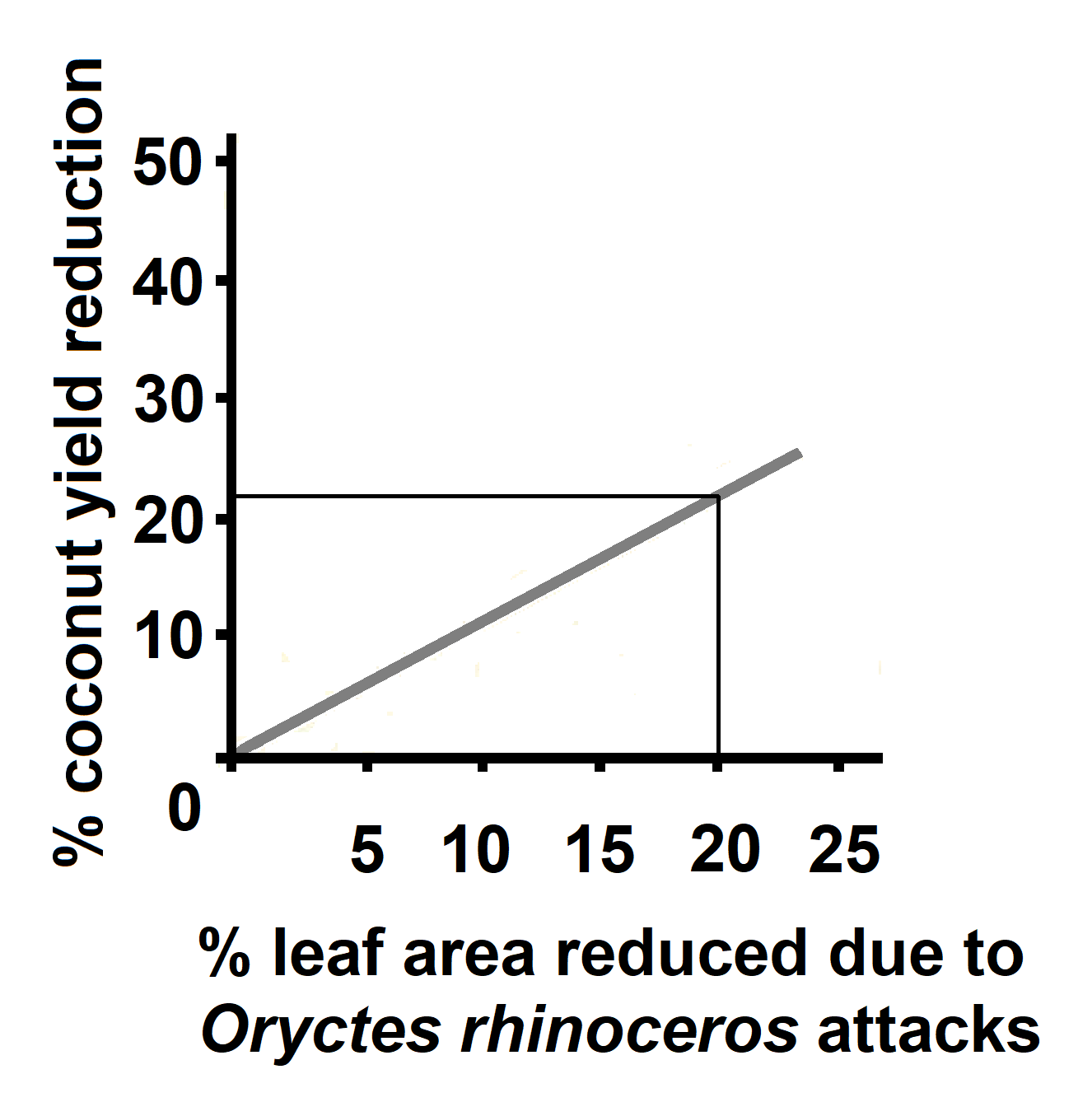
Coconut yield reduction due to Oryctes rhinoceros attacks, estimated by comparing undamaged palms with groups of palms naturally damaged by the beetle to different degrees.

The correlation between Oryctes rhinoceros damage and coconut yield has been estimated in Samoa with two different approaches. Firstly, damage by O. rhinoceros was simulated by cutting off parts of the new fronds as soon as they unfolded. Secondly, the leaf area naturally reduced through O. rhinoceros attacks was estimated in groups of palms damaged to different degrees. The leaf area reduced was then correlated with the number of nuts produced by these palms (see illustration on the right). For example, a reduction of the leaf area by 20% resulted in slightly more than a 20% reduction of coconuts produced. However, the natural variation in coconut yield among the studied palms was high and the reduction in coconut yield was higher in artificially pruned palms, slightly more than 30% for a 20% leaf area reduction.

== Outbreaks and management ==
Coconut rhinoceros beetle outbreaks are always associated with an abundance of breeding sites. These are usually created during replanting of coconut and oil palm plantations, when large numbers of palms are felled. The trunks decay and become available for breeding over a period of several years. At the same time, the young, replanted coconut or oil palms are particularly vulnerable to attacks by the beetle.

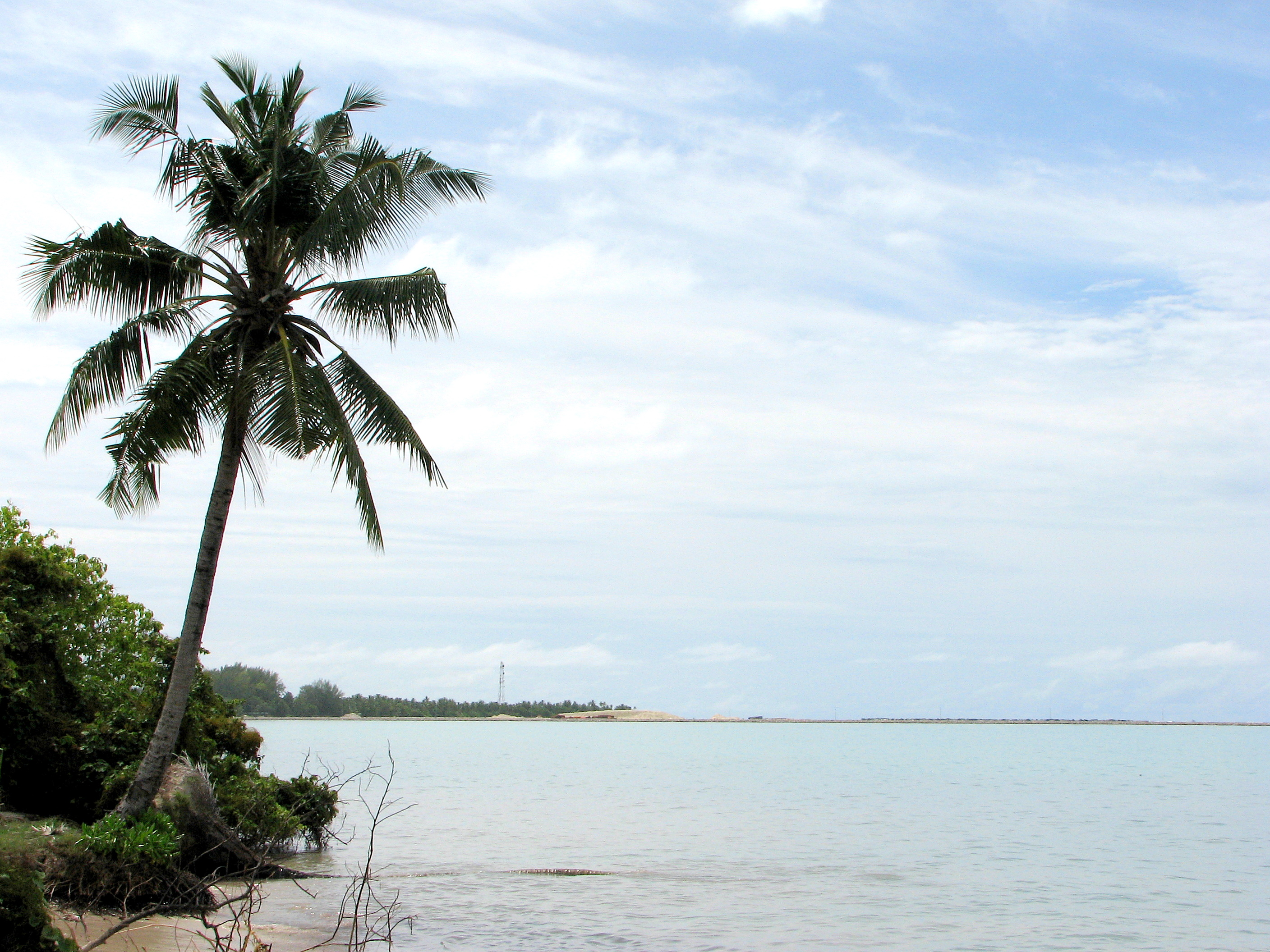
Coconut palm in the Maldives showing typical triangular cuts on the fronds caused by Oryctes rhinoceros (click on image to enlarge it)

Apart from how abundant breeding sites are, the severity of an outbreak depends mainly on two factors, on the ground vegetation, as well as the presence/absence of the most important natural control agent, the Oryctes rhinoceros nudivirus (see below). During large scale replanting, like in oil palm plantations in Indonesia, the trunks are often piled up high in large heaps, exposing them to beetles searching for breeding sites. Attempts to burn them is often not successful and creates air pollution. On the other hand, if the trunks lie on the ground and are hidden by vegetation (e.g. overgrown by a cover crop), most beetles will not find them. In addition, dense ground vegetation can also reduce the damage on young palms. In West Africa the fast-growing vine Pueraria javanica has been used very successfully to prevent breeding by Oryctes monoceros in coconut and oil palm trunks.

In Indonesia, hand-picking of beetles from the axils of palms is often practised in newly planted oil palm plantations. Pheromone traps have been also used for control, as well as for monitoring and for determining the incidence of virus infections in O. rhinoceros populations.

== Natural enemies and biological control ==
Since chemical control of Oryctes rhinoceros is not feasible, research on effective biological control agents has received special attention for many years. This included searching within the native distribution of the beetle for suitable predators, parasitoids and diseases.

=== Predators and parasitoids ===
Many species of predators and parasitoids were identified over the years and a variety of species were introduced into the invaded Pacific islands. However, there is little evidence that native or introduced predators and parasitoids cause a significant impact on the populations of the coconut rhinoceros beetle. For example, during a field survey of 600 breeding sites in the Philippines, <5% contained elaterid predators and only ~1% a predatory shrew. Parasitoids like Scolia ruficornis can be common in sawdust heaps where the adult wasps can find and reach the larvae relatively easily. However, Scolia wasps rarely reach larvae in coconut trunks.

=== Oryctes rhinoceros nudivirus ===
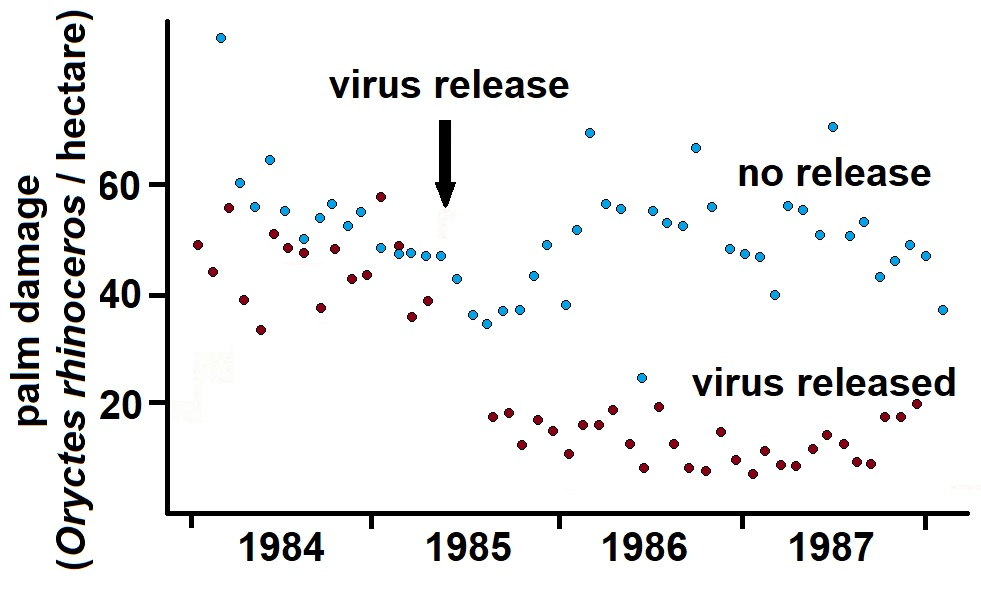
Effect of the introduction of the Oryctes rhinoceros nudivirus on the populations of Oryctes rhinoceros in the Maldives over 4 years. The damage on marked coconut palms has been converted into estimates of number of monthly O. rhinoceros attacks per hectare. Data from islands of Hukurudhoo Atoll (no virus release) are shown as blue dots, those from islands of Ari Atoll (virus released) as brown dots.

A virus disease of O.rhinoceros, the Oryctes rhinoceros nudivirus, turned out to be the most effective natural control agent. This virus was discovered by Alois Huger in Malaysia in 1963. It was later found to occur naturally in other countries within the native range of the beetle like the Philippines, Indonesia and India. However, the introduced beetle populations in the Pacific and those in the Maldives were found to be virus-free.

Introduction of the virus into virus-free populations caused a significant decline of the O. rhinoceros population. For example, virus releases in the islands of the Maldives typically reduced the beetle populations to less than one quarter of the level before the release. The virus effects mainly the population of adult O. rhinoceros beetles. It spreads easily among adults, reducing their life span and the fecundity of females.

However, during replanting of palms, when many breeding sites become available, transmission of the virus is often interrupted and outbreaks still occur, even with the presence of the virus. Under such conditions it is recommended to grow a cover crop over the breeding sites and under the palms, as well as to use a few dead standing palms to promote the spread of the virus. There is also evidence of resistance to the virus in some O.rhinoceros populations. See the separate article for more details on this virus disease.

=== Metarhizium majus ===
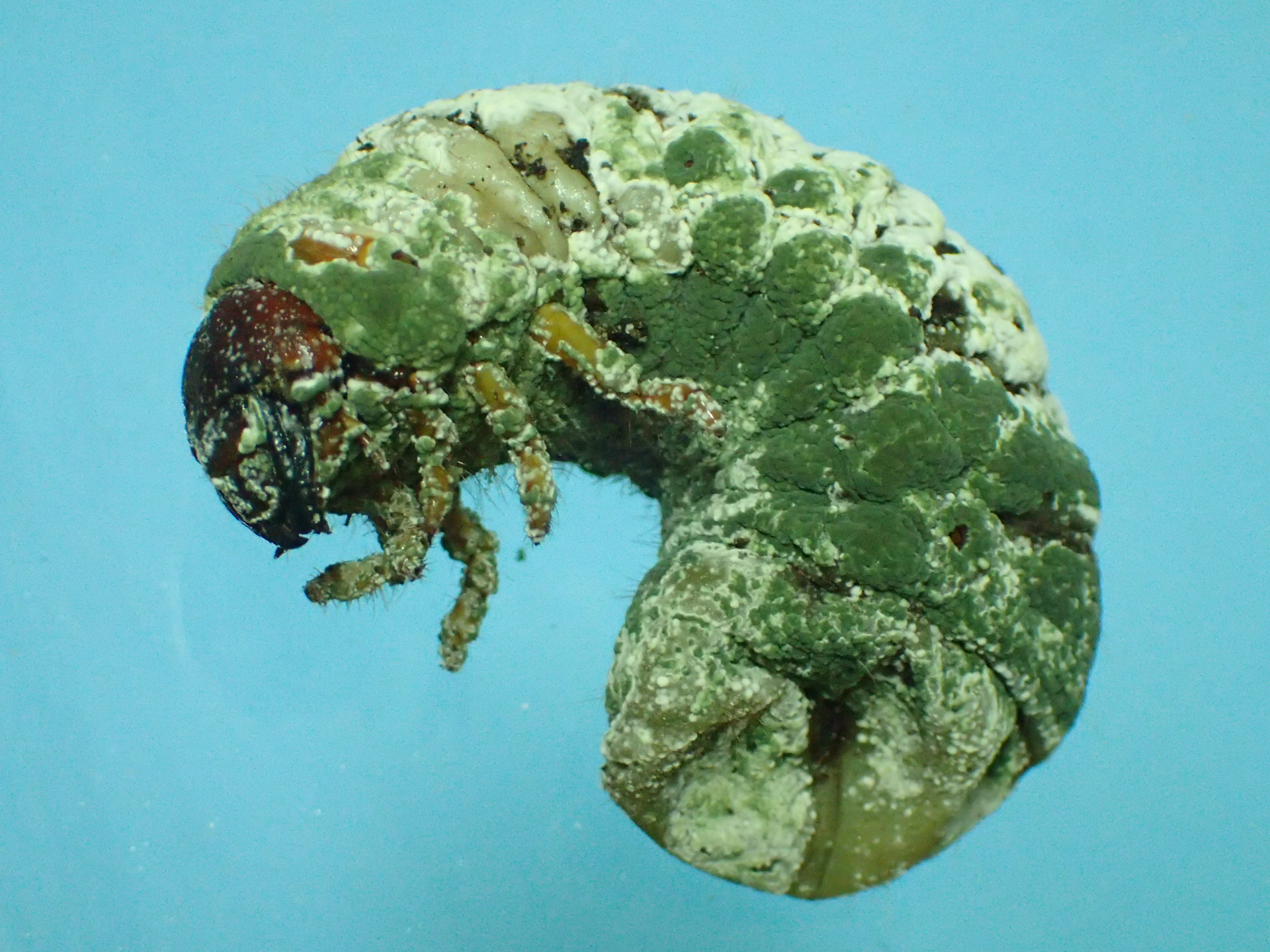
3rd instar O. rhinoceros larva killed by the fungus Metarhizium majus (click on image to enlarge it)

A second disease agent the fungus Metarhizium majus is also effective in controlling coconut rhinoceros beetles in breeding sites. However, unlike the virus disease, it does not spread very well by itself within an O. rhinoceros population. In the Philippines, only about 10% of the breeding sites naturally contained this fungus, and the effect of the fungus on the population of adult beetles is negligible.

Still, once established in a breeding site, this fungus provides long-term control of larvae in this particular site. Unlike the virus, the fungus survives for some time outside its host (as conidia). It can be an effective control agent if applied manually to each breeding site.

=== Rearing for laboratory studies ===
For research on biological control agents and for other studies, mass rearing of the beetle is required to provide healthy larvae and/or adult beetles of known age. Rearing in the natural preferred breeding media, decaying coconut trunks, is impractical, but the following method has given good results:
For larval food, dried cow dung, collected from cattle farms, is ground und mixed with heat-treated decaying sawdust or decaying wood using a suitable hammer mill. In Samoa, the very soft decaying wood from the large trunks of kapok trees (Ceiba) has given good results. Contamination with Metarhizium or the Oryctes virus can be a problem. Dried cow dung and decaying kapok wood do not contain these diseases, but decaying sawdust needs to be treated with steam to remove them. Adult beetles will lay eggs in heat-treated, decaying sawdust and are fed with ripe bananas, sliced lengthwise and left peel down on top of the sawdust. Eggs are then transferred to the above larval food.

== See also ==
- Oryctes agamemnon (Arabian rhinoceros beetle)
- Oryctes elegans (date palm fruit stalk borer)
- Oryctes monoceros (African rhinoceros beetle)
- Oryctes nasicornis (European rhinoceros beetle)
