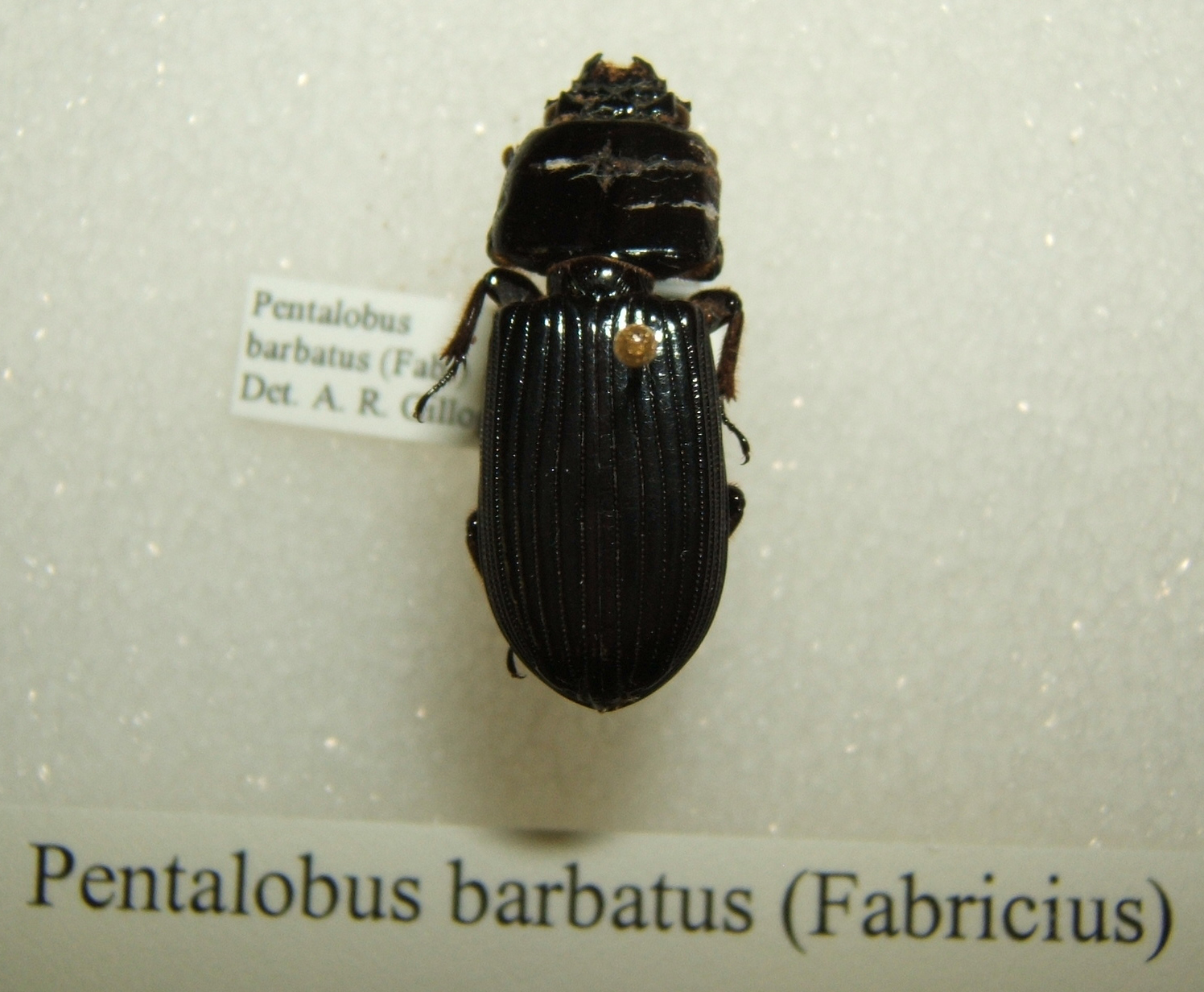
- Pentalobus barbatus, adult

Scientific classification
- Kingdom: Animalia
- Phylum: Arthropoda
- Clade: Pancrustacea
- Class: Insecta
- Order: Coleoptera
- Suborder: Polyphaga
- Infraorder: Scarabaeiformia
- Family: Passalidae
- Genus: Pentalobus
- Species: P. barbatus

Binomial name
- Pentalobus barbatus (Fabricius, 1801)

= Pentalobus barbatus =

Species of beetle

Pentalobus barbatus is a beetle species of the genus Pentalobus of the family Passalidae.
