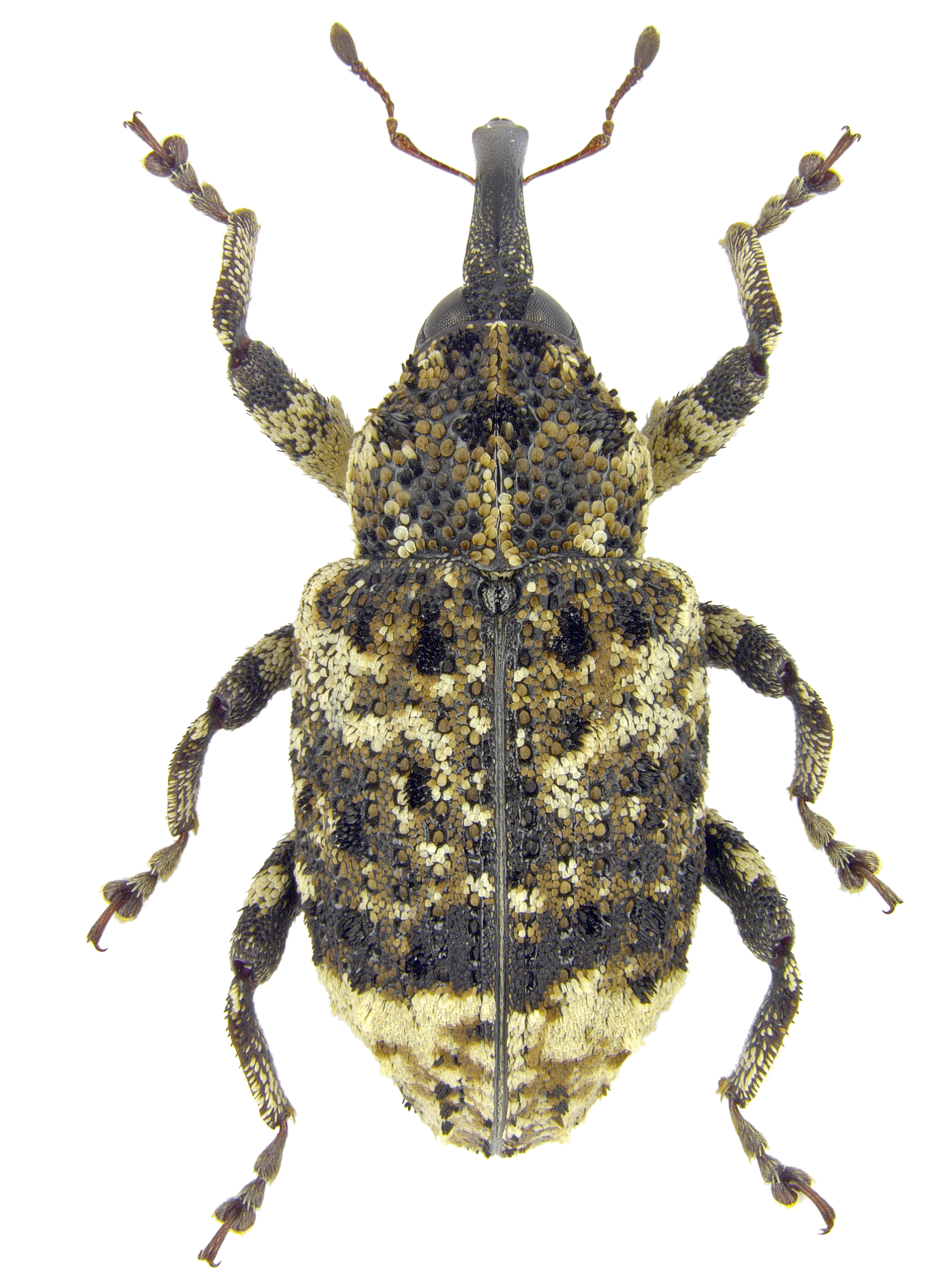
- Cryptorhynchus lapathi

Scientific classification
- Kingdom: Animalia
- Phylum: Arthropoda
- Class: Insecta
- Order: Coleoptera
- Suborder: Polyphaga
- Infraorder: Cucujiformia
- Family: Curculionidae
- Subfamily: Cryptorhynchinae; Schönherr, 1825

= Cryptorhynchinae =

Subfamily of beetles

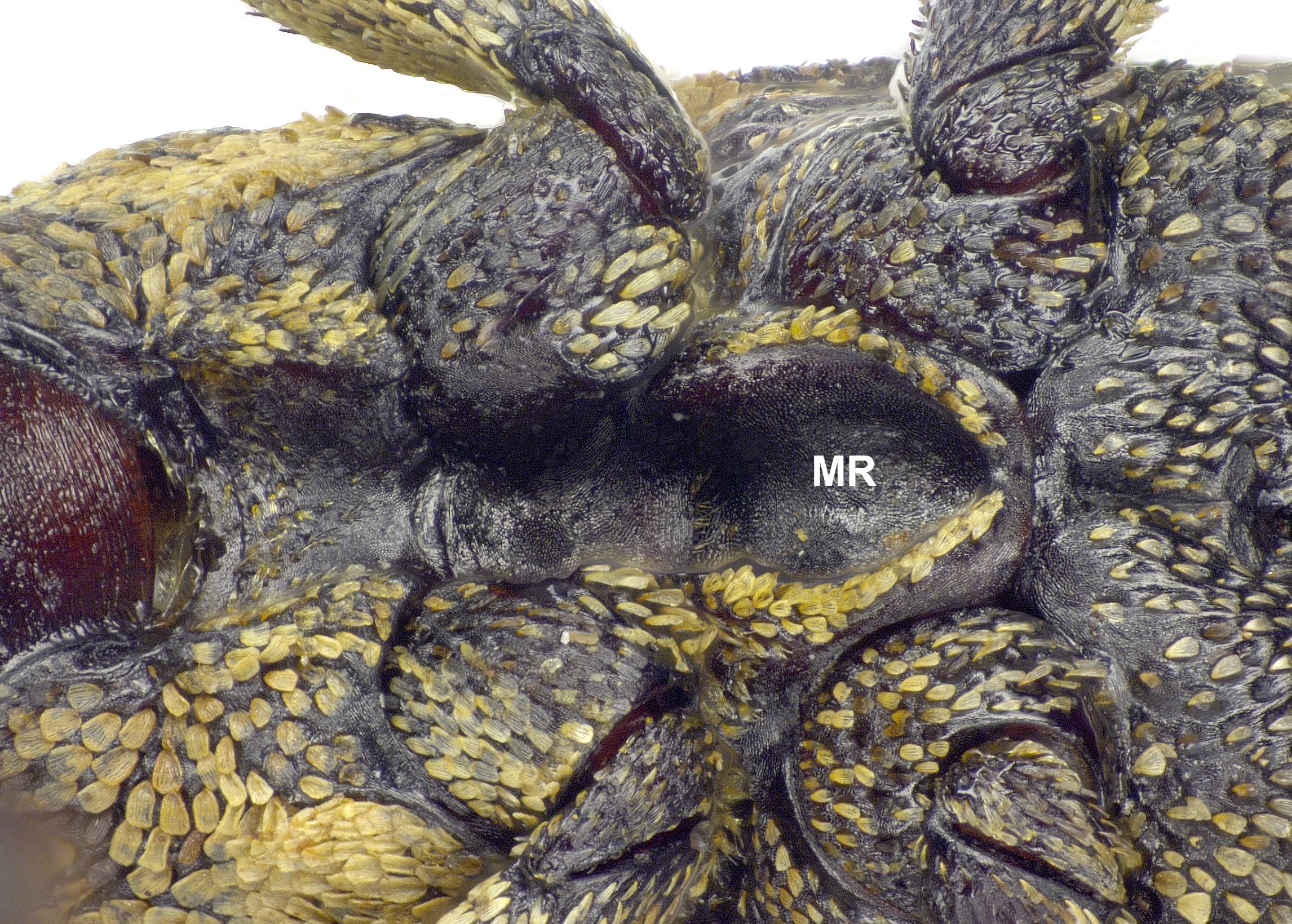
Cryptorhynchus lapathi, rostral furrow with mesoventral receptacle (MR), the diagnostic character of the Cryptorhynchinae sensu stricto

Cryptorhynchinae, from Ancient Greek κρυπτός (kruptós), meaning "hidden", and ῥύγχος (rhúnkos), meaning "snout", is a large subfamily of weevils (Curculionidae), with some 6000 species. They are found in most zoogeographic regions, although they are most diverse in the Neotropics, Australia, and Oceania.

They are distinguished by having their rostrum (snout) backwardly directed between their fore coxae in repose, and fitting within a protective channel that usually ends in a cup-like structure on the mesoventrite (ventral mid thoracic segment). The ends of the tibiae also bear an uncus (small hook-like extensions), a character they share with many other groups of Curculionidae that use woody plants for oviposition. They are merged into the Molytinae in some treatments, but a recent molecular study shows that Cryptorhynchinae sensu stricto are monophyletic and best kept as an independent subfamily.

Some species of the Cryptorhynchinae are considered agricultural pests, such as the mango seed weevil Sternochetus mangiferae, but the great majority of species lives in primary forests, often on deadwood and are threatened by habitat loss. In Europe, the flightless genus Acalles is most diverse, and restricted to woodlands of long-lasting habitat continuity.

According to a biogeographical analysis Cryptorhynchinae s.s. originated in the Late Cretaceous in South America. Within the Acalles group and the Cryptorhynchus group, several independent dispersal events to the Western Palaearctic via the Nearctic occurred in the Late Cretaceous and Early Paleogene. A southern route via Antarctica allowed the colonization of Australia in the Late Cretaceous, where a diverse Indo-Australian clade probably emerged about 73 million years ago.

== Selected genera ==
- Acalles Schönherr, 1825^{i c g b}
- Acallocrates Reitter, 1913^{i c g b}
- Achopera Pascoe, 1870^{a}
- Anaballus Blanchard, 1849^{c g}
- Apteromechus Faust, 1896^{i c g b}
- Asytesta Pascoe, 1865^{c g}
- Blepiarda Pascoe, 1865^{c g}
- Calles Kissinger, 1964^{i c g b}
- Canistes Casey, 1892^{i c g b}
- Cedilaus Lea, 1912^{c g}
- Cnemidoprion Marshall, 1933^{c g b}
- Cophes Champion, 1905^{i c g b}
- Cryptorhynchus Illiger, 1807^{i c g b}
- Didymus Kuschel, 1982^{c g}
- Episcirrus Kuschel, 1958^{i c g b}
- Eubulus Kirsch, 1870^{i c g b}
- Eurhoptus LeConte, 1876^{i c g b}
- Euscepes Schönherr, 1844^{i c g b}
- Eutinobothris^{b}
- Faustinus Berg, 1898^{i c g b}
- Gasterocercus de Laporte Castelnau La Ferté-Sénectère & Brullé, 1828^{c g}
- Gerstaeckeria Champion, 1905^{i c g b} (cactus weevils)
- Hohonus Kissinger, 1964^{i c g b}
- Lembodes Schönherr, 1844^{i c g b}
- Liometophilus Fall, 1912^{i c g b}
- Maemactes Schönherr, 1837^{i c g b}
- Neoulosomus O'Brien & Wibmer, 1982^{i c g b}
- Paracamptus Casey, 1895^{c g b}
- Peracalles Kissinger, 1964^{i c g b}
- Poropterus Schönherr, 1844^{c g}
- Psepholax A.White, 1843^{g}
- Pseudoacalles Blatchley, 1916^{i c g b}
- Pseudomopsis Champion, 1905^{i c g b}
- Pseudomus Schönherr, 1837^{i c g b}
- Rhyephenes Schönherr, 1837
- Rhynchodes White, 1846^{c g}
- Rhynchus Kissinger, 1964^{i c g b}
- Sternochetus Pierce, 1917^{i c g b}
- Sudus Kissinger, 1964^{i c g b}
- Tepperia Kirby, 1910^{g}
- Tragopus Schoenherr, 1837^{a c g}
- Trigonopterus Fauvel, 1862^{c g}
- Troezon Champion, 1906^{c g b}
- Tyloderma Say, 1831^{i c g b}
- Xenosacalles Stüben, 2024
- Zascelis LeConte, 1876^{i c g b}
- Zygara Pascoe, 1885^{c g}

Data sources: a=AFD, i = ITIS, c = Catalogue of Life, g = GBIF, b = Bugguide.net
