= List of Eubulus species =

This is a list of 204 species in Eubulus, a genus of hidden snout weevils in the family Curculionidae.

== Eubulus species ==
- Eubulus acuminatus Fiedler, 1954^{c}
- Eubulus albicollis Fiedler, 1954^{c}
- Eubulus albifrons Fiedler, 1939^{c}
- Eubulus albocucullatus Fiedler, 1952^{c}
- Eubulus albopectus Fiedler, 1954^{c}
- Eubulus albopictus Fiedler, 1939^{c}
- Eubulus albovittatus Fiedler, 1954^{c}
- Eubulus alticarinatus Champion, 1905^{c}
- Eubulus altifrons Fiedler, 1939^{c}
- Eubulus amazonus Fiedler, 1954^{c}
- Eubulus angularis Champion, 1905^{c}
- Eubulus annulatus Fiedler, 1939^{c}
- Eubulus annulifer Champion, 1905^{c}
- Eubulus aspericollis Kirsch, 1869^{c}
- Eubulus atricollis Champion, 1905^{c}
- Eubulus atrodiscus Champion, 1905^{c}
- Eubulus basirubescens Fiedler, 1952^{c}
- Eubulus biangularis Champion, 1905^{c}
- Eubulus bicolor Fiedler, 1939^{c}
- Eubulus bicuspis Champion, 1905^{c}
- Eubulus bidentatus Champion, 1905^{c}
- Eubulus bifasciculatus Champion, 1905^{c}
- Eubulus bihamatus Champion, 1905^{c}
- Eubulus biplagiatus Champion, 1905^{c}
- Eubulus bisignatifrons Papp, 1979^{c}
- Eubulus bisignatus (Say, 1831)^{i c g b}
- Eubulus boliviensis Hustache, 1924^{c}
- Eubulus brevifasciatus Fiedler, 1954^{c}
- Eubulus brevis Champion, 1905^{c}
- Eubulus bruchi Hustache, 1926^{c}
- Eubulus camelus Champion, 1905^{c}
- Eubulus campestris Champion, 1905^{c}
- Eubulus canaliculatus Fiedler, 1939^{c}
- Eubulus carinifrons Champion, 1905^{c}
- Eubulus cerviniventris Fiedler, 1939^{c}
- Eubulus cervinopunctatus Fiedler, 1954^{c}
- Eubulus cinctellus Kirsch, 1869^{c}
- Eubulus circumductus Champion, 1905^{c}
- Eubulus circumlitus Champion, 1905^{c}
- Eubulus clavatopilosus Fiedler, 1952^{c}
- Eubulus clavatus Fiedler, 1939^{c}
- Eubulus coecus Champion, 1905^{c}
- Eubulus confusus Wibmer & O'Brien, 1986^{c}
- Eubulus consanguineus Champion, 1905^{c}
- Eubulus convexipennis Fiedler, 1939^{c}
- Eubulus coronatus Fiedler, 1939^{c}
- Eubulus costatus Champion, 1905^{c}
- Eubulus costicollis Voss, 1947^{c}
- Eubulus crassisetis Fiedler, 1939^{c}
- Eubulus crinitus Champion, 1905^{c}
- Eubulus crispus Champion, 1905^{c}
- Eubulus cristula Champion, 1910^{c}
- Eubulus curvifasciatus Champion, 1905^{c}
- Eubulus deceptor Champion, 1905^{c}
- Eubulus densus Champion, 1905^{c}
- Eubulus diadematus Fiedler, 1954^{c}
- Eubulus diaspis Champion, 1905^{c}
- Eubulus discoideus Champion, 1905^{c}
- Eubulus dissecatus Fiedler, 1939^{c}
- Eubulus diversipes Fiedler, 1939^{c}
- Eubulus dumicola Champion, 1905^{c}
- Eubulus ectypus Fiedler, 1952^{c}
- Eubulus elongatus Hustache, 1924^{c}
- Eubulus extensus Fiedler, 1954^{c}
- Eubulus extraneus Fiedler, 1952^{c}
- Eubulus fasciculaticollis Fiedler, 1954^{c}
- Eubulus figuratus Voss, 1954^{c}
- Eubulus filicornis Fiedler, 1939^{c}
- Eubulus flavosparsus Fiedler, 1939^{c}
- Eubulus flavovariegatus Champion, 1905^{c}
- Eubulus foveirostris Fiedler, 1939^{c}
- Eubulus fraternus Fiedler, 1939^{c}
- Eubulus fulvescens Fiedler, 1939^{c}
- Eubulus fulvicolor Fiedler, 1939^{c}
- Eubulus fulvipes Fiedler, 1954^{c}
- Eubulus fulvisquamis Champion, 1905^{c}
- Eubulus fulvodiscus Champion, 1905^{c}
- Eubulus fulvopallidus Fiedler, 1939^{c}
- Eubulus fulvus Fiedler, 1939^{c}
- Eubulus gibbicollis Fiedler, 1954^{c}
- Eubulus gonocnemis Fiedler, 1954^{c}
- Eubulus gracilicornis Champion, 1905^{c}
- Eubulus granipennis Fiedler, 1939^{c}
- Eubulus granulatus Fiedler, 1939^{c}
- Eubulus haenschi Fiedler, 1954^{c}
- Eubulus hirsutus Fiedler, 1939^{c}
- Eubulus hirtus Fiedler, 1939^{c}
- Eubulus hospes Champion, 1905^{c}
- Eubulus hustachei Fiedler, 1954^{c}
- Eubulus ignifer Champion, 1905^{c}
- Eubulus imbricatus Fiedler, 1939^{c}
- Eubulus immarginatus Champion, 1905^{c}
- Eubulus impar Fiedler, 1939^{c}
- Eubulus inaequalis Champion, 1905^{c}
- Eubulus incrassatus Fiedler, 1939^{c}
- Eubulus incretus Fiedler, 1939^{c}
- Eubulus integer Champion, 1905^{c}
- Eubulus irrubescens Champion, 1905^{c}
- Eubulus lamellatus Champion, 1905^{c}
- Eubulus latefasciatus Fiedler, 1954^{c}
- Eubulus lateralis Fiedler, 1939^{c}
- Eubulus latevittatus Fiedler, 1954^{c}
- Eubulus laticollis Champion, 1905^{c}
- Eubulus leucopleura Champion, 1905^{c}
- Eubulus lineatipleura Champion, 1905^{c}
- Eubulus lineatulus Champion, 1905^{c}
- Eubulus longipes Champion, 1905^{c}
- Eubulus longisetis Champion, 1905^{c}
- Eubulus lugubris Fiedler, 1939^{c}
- Eubulus lunatus Hustache, 1932^{c}
- Eubulus maculicollis Fiedler, 1939^{c}
- Eubulus maculifrons Champion, 1905^{c}
- Eubulus marcidus Champion, 1905^{c}
- Eubulus marginatus Champion, 1905^{c}
- Eubulus melanodiscus Champion, 1905^{c}
- Eubulus melanotus Champion, 1905^{c}
- Eubulus melanurus Fiedler, 1939^{g}
- Eubulus miniatus Kuschel, 1950^{c}
- Eubulus misellus Champion, 1905^{c}
- Eubulus miser Champion, 1905^{c}
- Eubulus modestus Fiedler, 1954^{c}
- Eubulus moerens Champion, 1905^{c}
- Eubulus moestus Fiedler, 1939^{c}
- Eubulus monachus Hustache, 1936^{c}
- Eubulus multicostatus Fiedler, 1939^{c}
- Eubulus multisignatus Fiedler, 1939^{g}
- Eubulus munitus Kirsch, 1869^{c}
- Eubulus mutatus Champion, 1905^{c}
- Eubulus nigricollis Champion, 1905^{c}
- Eubulus nigrinus Fiedler, 1954^{c}
- Eubulus nigrocordatus Fiedler, 1939^{c}
- Eubulus nigrodiscus Champion, 1905^{c}
- Eubulus nigronotatus Hustache, 1924^{c}
- Eubulus nigroplagiatus Fiedler, 1954^{c}
- Eubulus nigrosignatus Champion, 1905^{c}
- Eubulus nimbatus Champion, 1905^{c}
- Eubulus niveipictus Hustache, 1940^{c}
- Eubulus niveopictus Fiedler, 1939^{c}
- Eubulus nodulosus Fiedler, 1939^{c}
- Eubulus notaticollis Fiedler, 1939^{c}
- Eubulus obliquefasciatus ^{b}
- Eubulus ocellatus Champion, 1905^{c}
- Eubulus olivaceus Fiedler, 1939^{c}
- Eubulus opacus Fiedler, 1939^{c}
- Eubulus orthomasticus Kirsch, 1869^{c}
- Eubulus ovalis Fiedler, 1939^{c}
- Eubulus ovatellus Fiedler, 1954^{c}
- Eubulus paranaensis Fiedler, 1954^{c}
- Eubulus parilis Fiedler, 1954^{c}
- Eubulus parochus (Herbst, 1797)^{i c g b}
- Eubulus perforatus Fiedler, 1939^{c}
- Eubulus persimilis Fiedler, 1939^{c}
- Eubulus pilipectus Champion, 1905^{c}
- Eubulus piluliformis Fiedler, 1954^{c}
- Eubulus plagiatus Fiedler, 1939^{c}
- Eubulus planifrons Fiedler, 1939^{c}
- Eubulus pleurostigma Champion, 1905^{c}
- Eubulus praestabilis Fiedler, 1954^{c}
- Eubulus protensus Fiedler, 1939^{c}
- Eubulus pulchellus Champion, 1905^{c}
- Eubulus punctifrons Champion, 1905^{c}
- Eubulus pygmaeus Fiedler, 1954^{c}
- Eubulus quadricollis Champion, 1905^{c}
- Eubulus quatuordecimcostatus Fiedler, 1939^{c}
- Eubulus reticollis Fiedler, 1954^{c}
- Eubulus reticulatus Champion, 1905^{c}
- Eubulus rhomboidalis Fiedler, 1939^{c}
- Eubulus romani Fiedler, 1939^{c}
- Eubulus rudis Fiedler, 1954^{c}
- Eubulus rugifrons Fiedler, 1939^{c}
- Eubulus sagittarius Fiedler, 1952^{c}
- Eubulus sellatus Fiedler, 1954^{c}
- Eubulus semifasciatus Fiedler, 1939^{c}
- Eubulus seminiger Champion, 1905^{c}
- Eubulus serius Champion, 1905^{c}
- Eubulus signaticollis Champion, 1905^{c}
- Eubulus signatifrons Champion, 1905^{c}
- Eubulus silaceus Fiedler, 1939^{c}
- Eubulus simplicifrons Fiedler, 1939^{c}
- Eubulus singularis Fiedler, 1954^{c}
- Eubulus sparsifrons Fiedler, 1939^{c}
- Eubulus sparsipes Fiedler, 1939^{c}
- Eubulus squamipennis Champion, 1905^{c}
- Eubulus stipator Hustache, 1936^{c}
- Eubulus stipulator Kirsch, 1869^{c}
- Eubulus stramineus Fiedler, 1939^{c}
- Eubulus subovalis Fiedler, 1939^{c}
- Eubulus subrhombeus Fiedler, 1952^{c}
- Eubulus tenuicornis Fiedler, 1954^{c}
- Eubulus tenuifasciatus Fiedler, 1939^{c}
- Eubulus tenuivittatus Fiedler, 1954^{c}
- Eubulus tessellatus Blatchley & Leng, 1916^{c}
- Eubulus tetricus Champion, 1905^{c}
- Eubulus theobromae Wibmer & O'Brien, 1986^{c}
- Eubulus thoracicus Hustache, 1930^{c}
- Eubulus tigrensis Hustache, 1939^{c}
- Eubulus triangularis Kirsch, 1869^{c}
- Eubulus trigonalis Champion, 1905^{c}
- Eubulus truncatellus Fiedler, 1954^{c}
- Eubulus truncatus Champion, 1905^{c}
- Eubulus unidentatus Champion, 1905^{c}
- Eubulus variegatus Fiedler, 1939^{c}
- Eubulus variicollis Fiedler, 1939^{c}
- Eubulus virgatulus Marshall, 1933^{c}

Data sources: i = ITIS, c = Catalogue of Life, g = GBIF, b = Bugguide.net
