= Gasterocercini =

Scientific classification
- Kingdom: Animalia
- Phylum: Arthropoda
- Clade: Pancrustacea
- Class: Insecta
- Order: Coleoptera
- Suborder: Polyphaga
- Infraorder: Cucujiformia
- Family: Curculionidae
- Subfamily: Cryptorhynchinae
- Tribe: Gasterocercini

Tribe of beetles

Gasterocercini is a tribe of hidden snout weevils in the family of beetles known as Curculionidae. There are at least four genera and about eight described species in Gasterocercini.

== Genera ==
These four genera belong to the tribe Gasterocercini:

- Cophes Champion, 1905^{i c g b}
- Episcirrus Kuschel, 1958^{i c g b}
- Hohonus Kissinger, 1964^{i c g b}
- Rhynchus Kissinger, 1964^{i c g b}

Data sources: i = ITIS, c = Catalogue of Life, g = GBIF, b = Bugguide.net
