= Rhynchus =

Rhynchus may refer to:

- Rhynchus (beetle), a genus of beetles
- Rhynchus (Greece), a town of ancient Greece
- see also List of commonly used taxonomic affixes
