= Tyloderma marshalli =

Scientific classification
- Domain: Eukaryota
- Kingdom: Animalia
- Phylum: Arthropoda
- Class: Insecta
- Order: Coleoptera
- Suborder: Polyphaga
- Infraorder: Cucujiformia
- Family: Curculionidae
- Subfamily: Cryptorhynchinae
- Tribe: Cryptorhynchini
- Subtribe: Cryptorhynchina
- Genus: Tyloderma
- Species: T. marshalli

Binomial name
- Tyloderma marshalli Wibmer, 1981

Species of beetle

Tyloderma marshalli is a species of hidden snout weevil in the family Curculionidae. It is found in North America.
