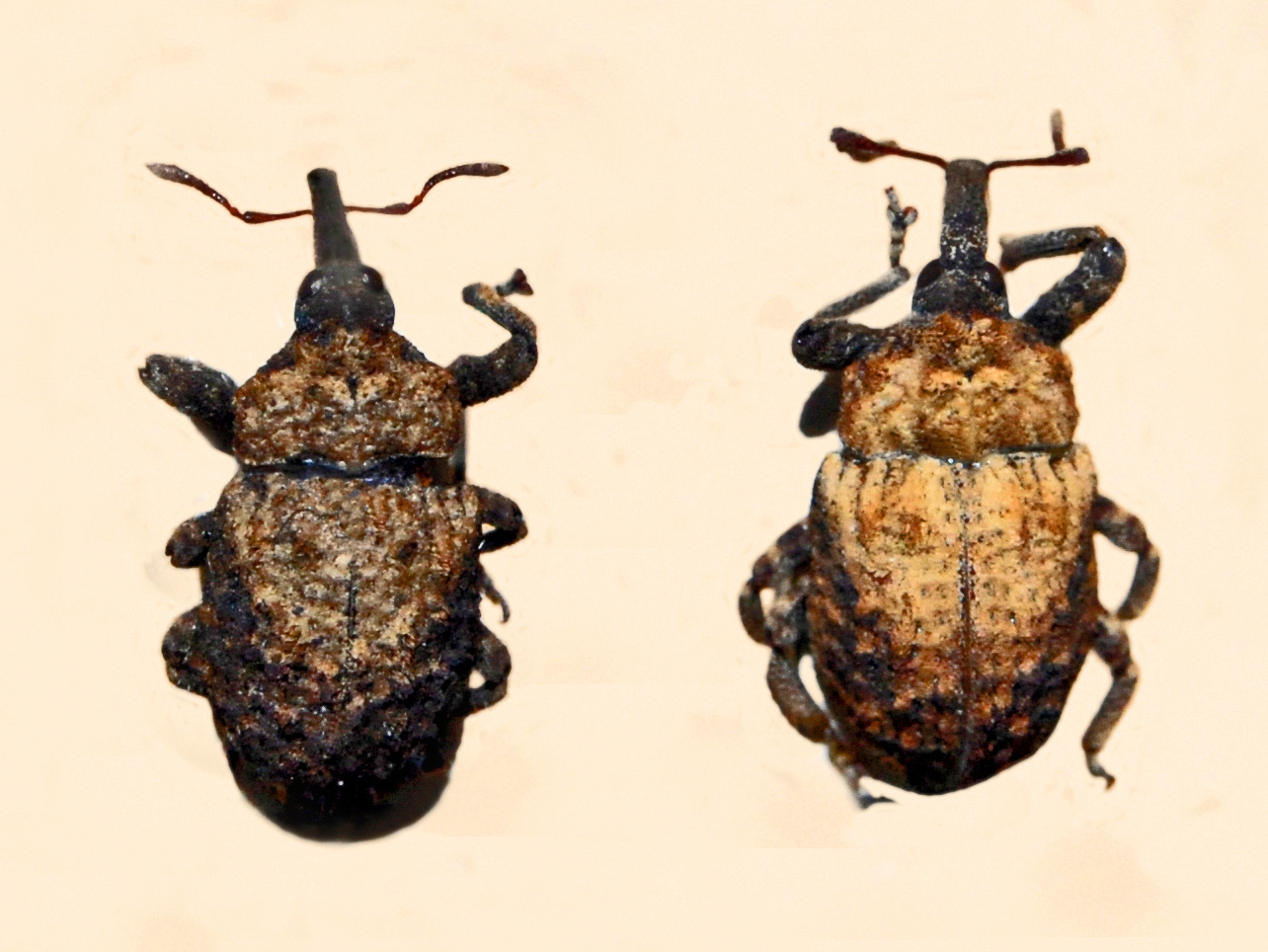
- Pseudoporopterus simulator

Scientific classification
- Kingdom: Animalia
- Phylum: Arthropoda
- Class: Insecta
- Order: Coleoptera
- Suborder: Polyphaga
- Infraorder: Cucujiformia
- Family: Curculionidae
- Subfamily: Cryptorhynchinae
- Genus: Pseudoporopterus; Lea 1898

= Pseudoporopterus =

Genus of beetles

Pseudoporopterus is a genus of weevils belonging to the family Curculionidae.

== Species ==
- Pseudoporopterus bivittatus
- Pseudoporopterus impius
- Pseudoporopterus irrasus
- Pseudoporopterus karnyi
- Pseudoporopterus karryi
- Pseudoporopterus leai
- Pseudoporopterus lemur
- Pseudoporopterus minahassus
- Pseudoporopterus mitratus
- Pseudoporopterus pertinax
- Pseudoporopterus pertinax
- Pseudoporopterus simulator
- Pseudoporopterus solus
- Pseudoporopterus sulcicollis
- Pseudoporopterus sulcifrons
