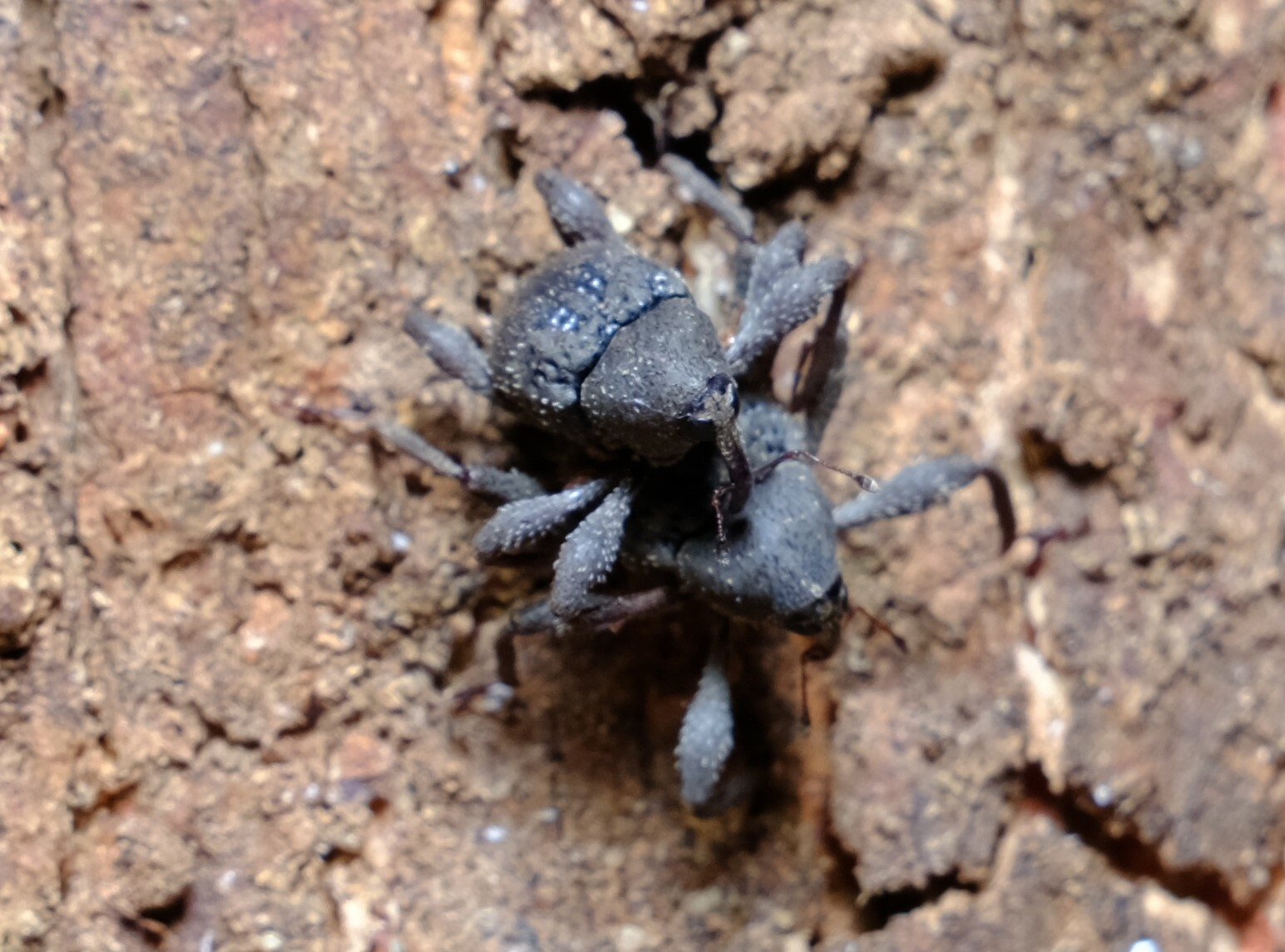
- Onidistus araneus, Australia

Scientific classification
- Kingdom: Animalia
- Phylum: Arthropoda
- Class: Insecta
- Order: Coleoptera
- Suborder: Polyphaga
- Infraorder: Cucujiformia
- Family: Curculionidae
- Subfamily: Cryptorhynchinae
- Tribe: Cryptorhynchini
- Genus: Onidistus; Pascoe, 1870

Synonyms
- Onidustus Lea, 1913

= Onidistus =

Genus of beetles

Onidistus is a genus of hidden snout weevils in the beetle family Curculionidae. There are about four described species in Onidistus, found in Australia and the South Pacific.

== Species ==
These species belong to the genus Onidistus:

- Onidistus araneus Pascoe, 1870
- Onidistus nodipennis Pascoe, 1870
- Onidistus pacificus Fauvel, 1862
- Onidistus subfornicatus Lea, 1912
