= Tyloderma angustulum =

Scientific classification
- Domain: Eukaryota
- Kingdom: Animalia
- Phylum: Arthropoda
- Class: Insecta
- Order: Coleoptera
- Suborder: Polyphaga
- Infraorder: Cucujiformia
- Family: Curculionidae
- Genus: Tyloderma
- Species: T. angustulum

Binomial name
- Tyloderma angustulum Casey, 1892

Species of beetle

Tyloderma angustulum is a species of hidden snout weevil in the beetle family Curculionidae. It is found in the United States.
