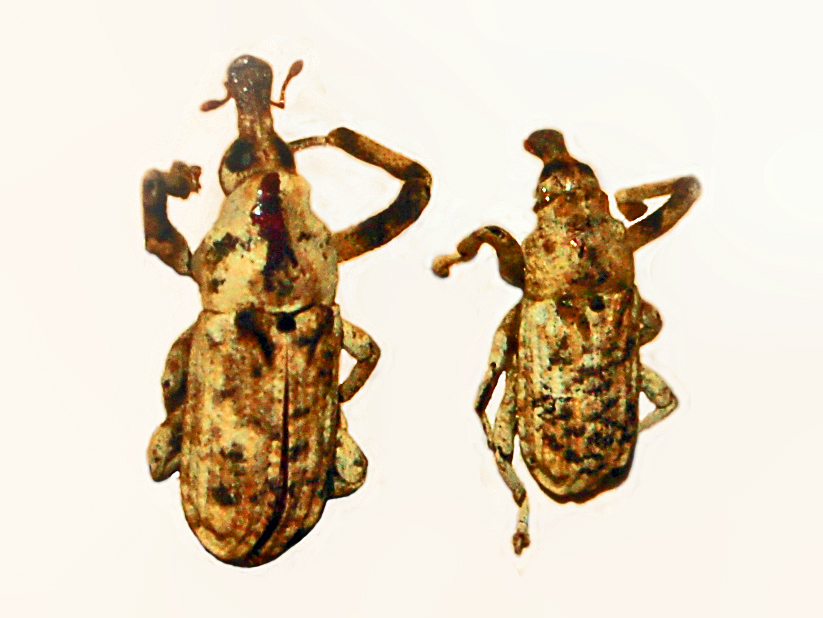
- Gasterocercus anatinus from New Guinea

Scientific classification
- Kingdom: Animalia
- Phylum: Arthropoda
- Class: Insecta
- Order: Coleoptera
- Suborder: Polyphaga
- Infraorder: Cucujiformia
- Family: Curculionidae
- Genus: Gasterocercus
- Species: G. anatinus

Binomial name
- Gasterocercus anatinus Chevrolat, 1882

= Gasterocercus anatinus =

Species of beetle

Gasterocercus anatinus is a species of beetle belonging to the true weevil family. It is known from the Andaman Islands and Manipur, India, and from Luzon, the Philippines.

The holotype measures 8 mm (0.31 in) in length.
