= Tyloderma circumcaribbeum =

Scientific classification
- Domain: Eukaryota
- Kingdom: Animalia
- Phylum: Arthropoda
- Class: Insecta
- Order: Coleoptera
- Suborder: Polyphaga
- Infraorder: Cucujiformia
- Family: Curculionidae
- Genus: Tyloderma
- Species: T. circumcaribbeum

Binomial name
- Tyloderma circumcaribbeum Wibmer, 1981

Species of beetle

Tyloderma circumcaribbeum is a species of hidden snout weevil in the beetle family Curculionidae. It is found in North America.
