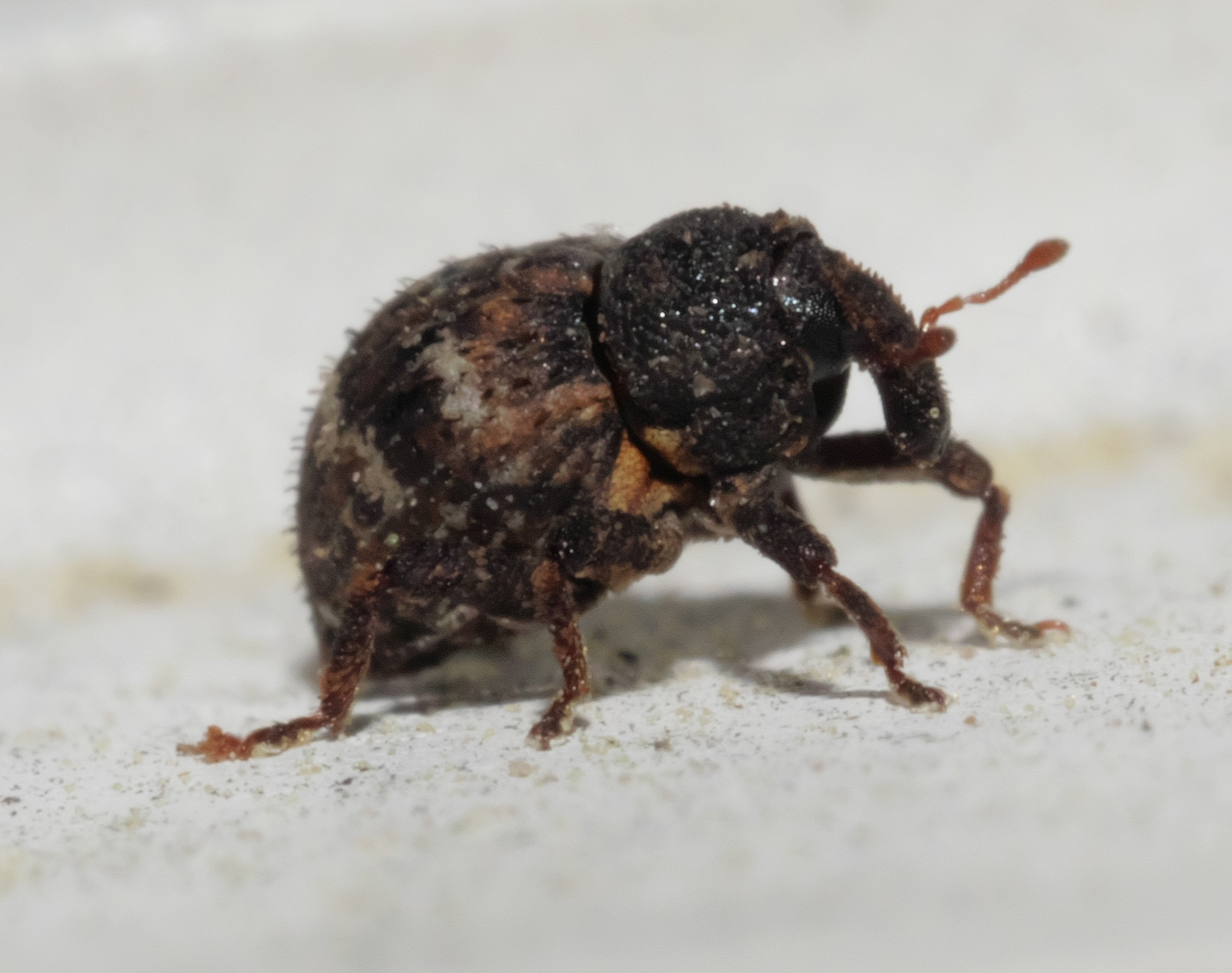
- Peracalles pectoralis, Oklahoma

Scientific classification
- Kingdom: Animalia
- Phylum: Arthropoda
- Class: Insecta
- Order: Coleoptera
- Suborder: Polyphaga
- Infraorder: Cucujiformia
- Family: Curculionidae
- Genus: Peracalles
- Species: P. pectoralis

Binomial name
- Peracalles pectoralis (LeConte, 1876)

Synonyms
- Acalles ohioensis Sleeper, 1953

= Peracalles pectoralis =

Species of beetle

Peracalles pectoralis is a species of hidden snout weevil in the beetle family Curculionidae. It is found in North America.
