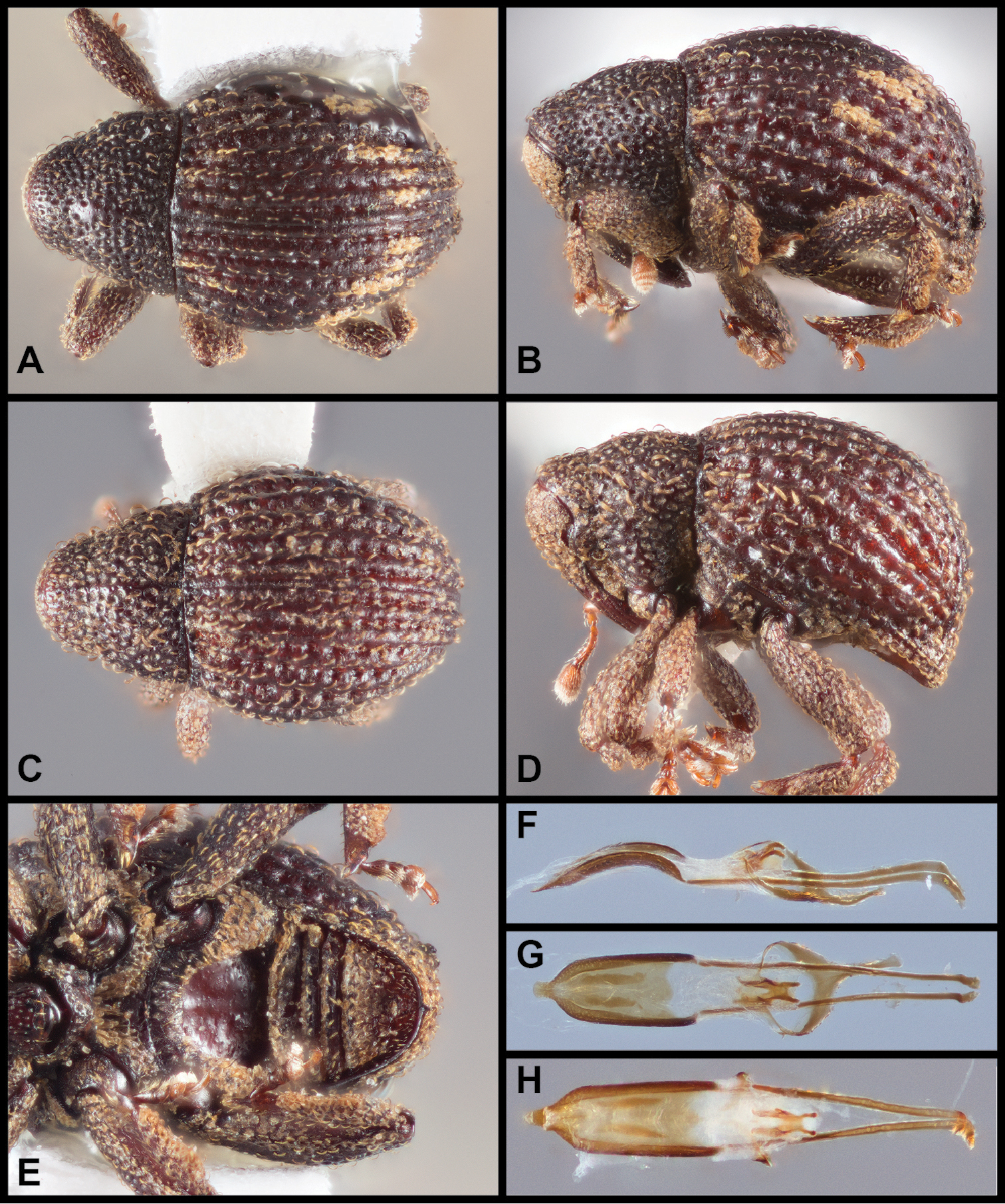

Scientific classification
- Domain: Eukaryota
- Kingdom: Animalia
- Phylum: Arthropoda
- Class: Insecta
- Order: Coleoptera
- Suborder: Polyphaga
- Infraorder: Cucujiformia
- Family: Curculionidae
- Genus: Eurhoptus
- Species: E. pyriformis

Binomial name
- Eurhoptus pyriformis LeConte, 1876

= Eurhoptus pyriformis =

Species of beetle

Eurhoptus pyriformis is a species of hidden snout weevil in the beetle family Curculionidae. It is found in North America. It is flightless and inhabits leaf litter.
