= Apteromechus longus =

Scientific classification
- Kingdom: Animalia
- Phylum: Arthropoda
- Class: Insecta
- Order: Coleoptera
- Suborder: Polyphaga
- Infraorder: Cucujiformia
- Family: Curculionidae
- Genus: Apteromechus
- Species: A. longus

Binomial name
- Apteromechus longus (LeConte, 1876)

Synonyms
- Cryptorhynchus schwarzi Blatchley, 1916

Species of beetle

Apteromechus longus is a species of hidden snout weevil in the beetle family Curculionidae. It is found in North America.
