= Tyloderma baridium =

Scientific classification
- Domain: Eukaryota
- Kingdom: Animalia
- Phylum: Arthropoda
- Class: Insecta
- Order: Coleoptera
- Suborder: Polyphaga
- Infraorder: Cucujiformia
- Family: Curculionidae
- Genus: Tyloderma
- Species: T. baridium

Binomial name
- Tyloderma baridium LeConte, 1876

Species of beetle

Tyloderma baridium is a species in the family Curculionidae ("snout and bark beetles"), in the order Coleoptera ("beetles"). Tyloderma baridium is found in North America.
