= Peracalles ventrosus =

Scientific classification
- Kingdom: Animalia
- Phylum: Arthropoda
- Class: Insecta
- Order: Coleoptera
- Suborder: Polyphaga
- Infraorder: Cucujiformia
- Family: Curculionidae
- Genus: Peracalles
- Species: P. ventrosus

Binomial name
- Peracalles ventrosus (LeConte, 1878)

Species of beetle

Peracalles ventrosus is a species of hidden snout weevil in the beetle family Curculionidae. It is found in North America.
