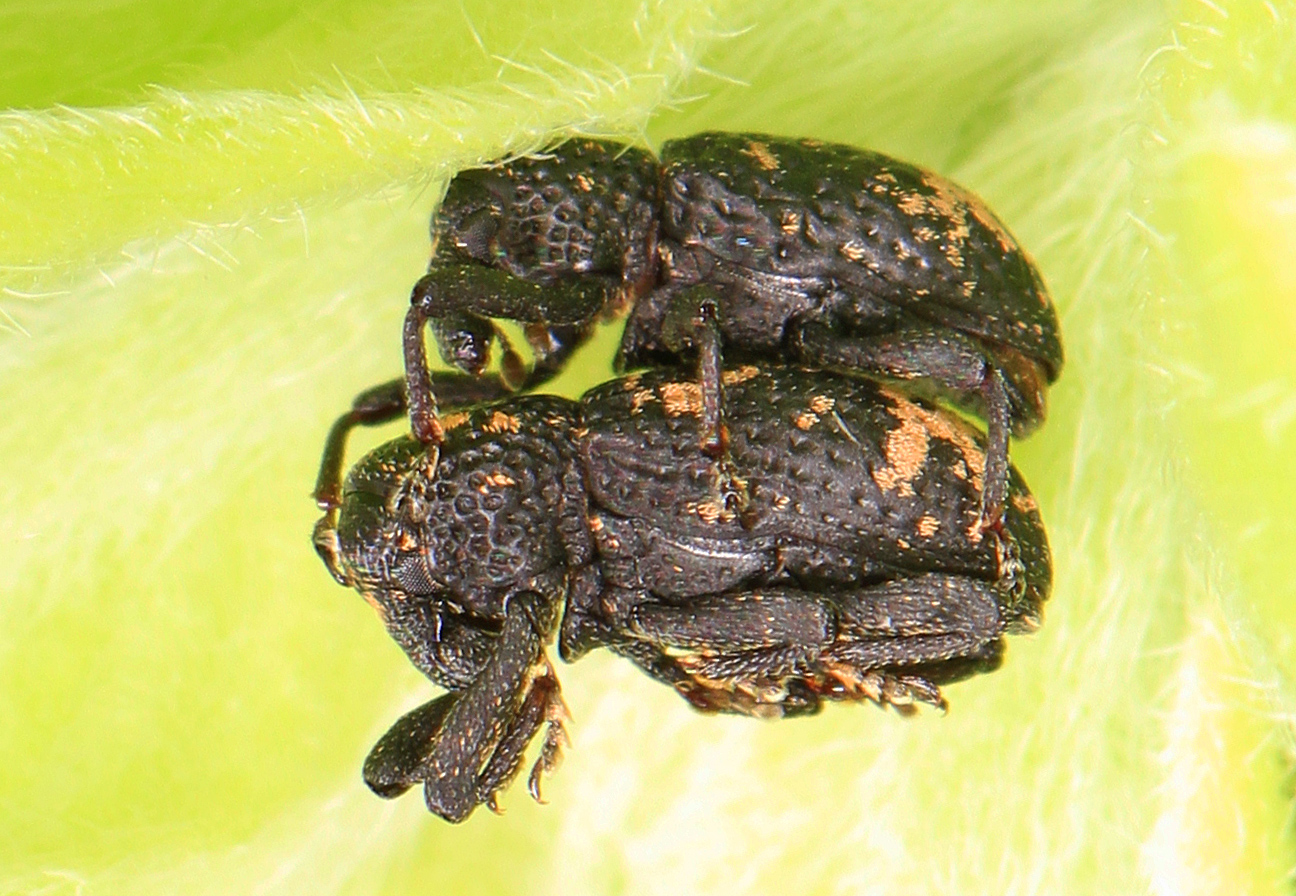

Scientific classification
- Domain: Eukaryota
- Kingdom: Animalia
- Phylum: Arthropoda
- Class: Insecta
- Order: Coleoptera
- Suborder: Polyphaga
- Infraorder: Cucujiformia
- Family: Curculionidae
- Genus: Tyloderma
- Species: T. foveolatum

Binomial name
- Tyloderma foveolatum (Say, 1831)

= Tyloderma foveolatum =

Species of beetle

Tyloderma foveolatum is a species of hidden snout weevil in the beetle family Curculionidae.
