= Zascelis irrorata =

Scientific classification
- Kingdom: Animalia
- Phylum: Arthropoda
- Class: Insecta
- Order: Coleoptera
- Suborder: Polyphaga
- Infraorder: Cucujiformia
- Family: Curculionidae
- Genus: Zascelis
- Species: Z. irrorata

Binomial name
- Zascelis irrorata LeConte, 1876

Species of beetle

Zascelis irrorata is a species of hidden snout weevil in the beetle family Curculionidae. It is found in North America.
