= Tyloderma lecontei =

Scientific classification
- Domain: Eukaryota
- Kingdom: Animalia
- Phylum: Arthropoda
- Class: Insecta
- Order: Coleoptera
- Suborder: Polyphaga
- Infraorder: Cucujiformia
- Family: Curculionidae
- Genus: Tyloderma
- Species: T. lecontei

Binomial name
- Tyloderma lecontei Wibmer, 1981

Species of beetle

Tyloderma lecontei is a species of hidden snout weevil in the family of beetles known as Curculionidae. It is found in North America.
