= Tyloderma nigrum =

Scientific classification
- Domain: Eukaryota
- Kingdom: Animalia
- Phylum: Arthropoda
- Class: Insecta
- Order: Coleoptera
- Suborder: Polyphaga
- Infraorder: Cucujiformia
- Family: Curculionidae
- Genus: Tyloderma
- Species: T. nigrum

Binomial name
- Tyloderma nigrum Casey, 1884

Synonyms
- Tyloderma asclepiasae Sleeper, 1955

Species of beetle

Tyloderma nigrum is a species of hidden snout weevil in the beetle family Curculionidae. It is found in North America.
