= Tyloderma pseudofoveolatum =

Scientific classification
- Domain: Eukaryota
- Kingdom: Animalia
- Phylum: Arthropoda
- Class: Insecta
- Order: Coleoptera
- Suborder: Polyphaga
- Infraorder: Cucujiformia
- Family: Curculionidae
- Genus: Tyloderma
- Species: T. pseudofoveolatum

Binomial name
- Tyloderma pseudofoveolatum Wibmer, 1981

Species of beetle

Tyloderma pseudofoveolatum is a species of hidden snout weevil in the beetle family Curculionidae. It is found in North America.
