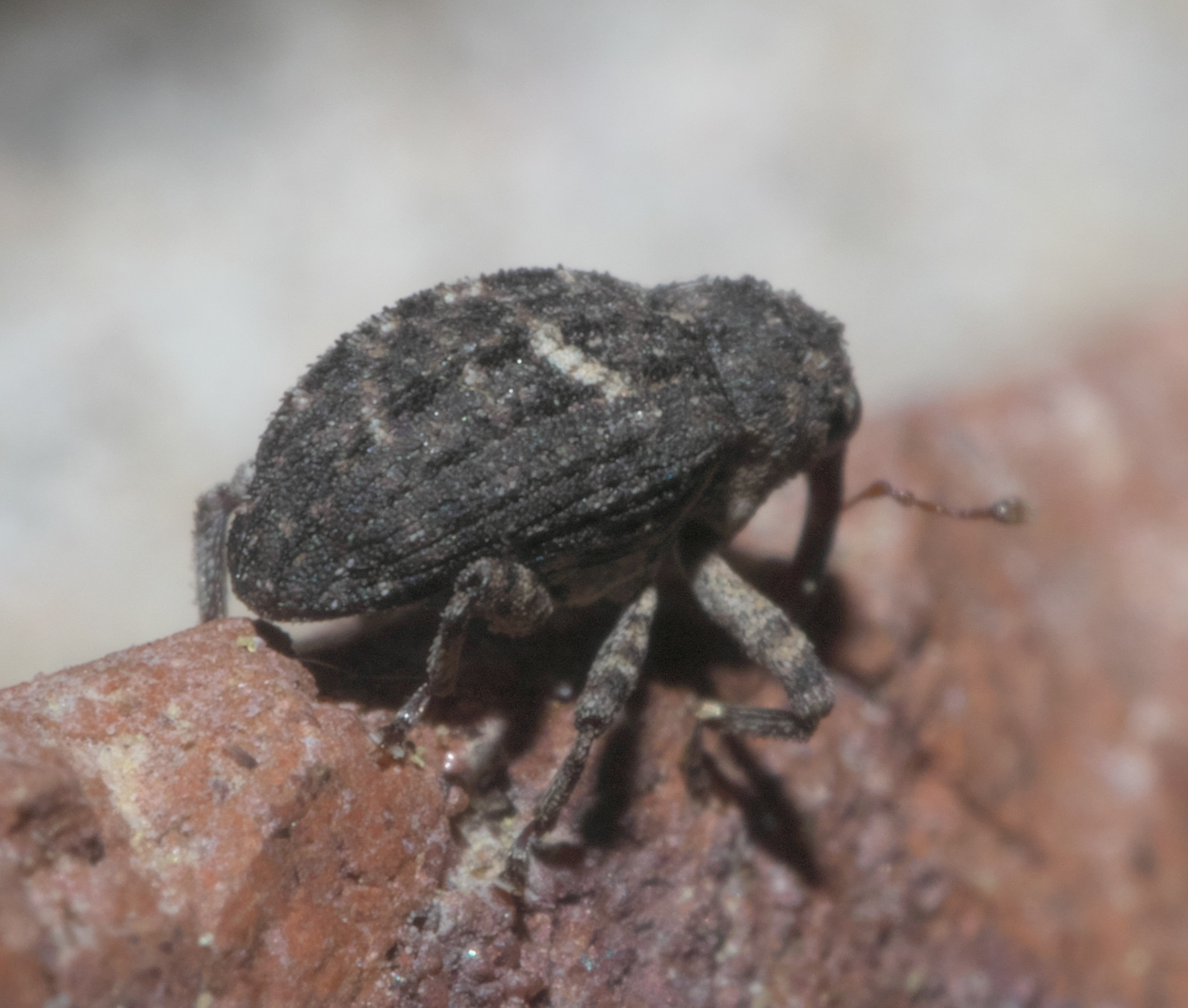
- Eubulus bisignatus, Oklahoma

Scientific classification
- Domain: Eukaryota
- Kingdom: Animalia
- Phylum: Arthropoda
- Class: Insecta
- Order: Coleoptera
- Suborder: Polyphaga
- Infraorder: Cucujiformia
- Family: Curculionidae
- Genus: Eubulus
- Species: E. bisignatus

Binomial name
- Eubulus bisignatus (Say, 1831)

Synonyms
- Cryptorhynchus obliquefasciatus Boheman, 1844; Cryptorhynchus tessellatus Blatchley, 1916

= Eubulus bisignatus =

Species of beetle

Eubulus bisignatus is a species of hidden snout weevil in the beetle family Curculionidae.
