= Apteromechus pumilus =

Scientific classification
- Kingdom: Animalia
- Phylum: Arthropoda
- Class: Insecta
- Order: Coleoptera
- Suborder: Polyphaga
- Infraorder: Cucujiformia
- Family: Curculionidae
- Genus: Apteromechus
- Species: A. pumilus

Binomial name
- Apteromechus pumilus (Boheman, 1837)

Synonyms
- Apteromechus microstictus Fall, 1925

Species of beetle

Apteromechus pumilus is a species of hidden snout weevil in the beetle family Curculionidae. It is found in North America.
