= Pseudomus sedentarius =

Scientific classification
- Domain: Eukaryota
- Kingdom: Animalia
- Phylum: Arthropoda
- Class: Insecta
- Order: Coleoptera
- Suborder: Polyphaga
- Infraorder: Cucujiformia
- Family: Curculionidae
- Genus: Pseudomus
- Species: P. sedentarius

Binomial name
- Pseudomus sedentarius (Say, 1831)

Species of beetle

Pseudomus sedentarius is a species of hidden snout weevil in the beetle family Curculionidae. It is found in North America.
