= Eubulus parochus =

Scientific classification
- Kingdom: Animalia
- Phylum: Arthropoda
- Class: Insecta
- Order: Coleoptera
- Suborder: Polyphaga
- Infraorder: Cucujiformia
- Family: Curculionidae
- Genus: Eubulus
- Species: E. parochus

Binomial name
- Eubulus parochus (Herbst, 1797)

Synonyms
- Cryptorhynchus luctuosus Boheman, 1837

Species of beetle

Eubulus parochus is a species of hidden snout weevil in the beetle family Curculionidae. It is found in North America.
