= Tyloderma variegatum =

Scientific classification
- Kingdom: Animalia
- Phylum: Arthropoda
- Clade: Pancrustacea
- Class: Insecta
- Order: Coleoptera
- Suborder: Polyphaga
- Infraorder: Cucujiformia
- Superfamily: Curculionoidea
- Family: Curculionidae
- Genus: Tyloderma
- Species: T. variegatum

Binomial name
- Tyloderma variegatum (Horn, 1873)

Species of beetle

Tyloderma variegatum is a species of hidden snout weevil in the beetle family Curculionidae. It is found across the eastern United States, inhabiting wetlands and aquatic areas.
