= Liometophilus manni =

Scientific classification
- Domain: Eukaryota
- Kingdom: Animalia
- Phylum: Arthropoda
- Class: Insecta
- Order: Coleoptera
- Suborder: Polyphaga
- Infraorder: Cucujiformia
- Family: Curculionidae
- Genus: Liometophilus
- Species: L. manni

Binomial name
- Liometophilus manni Fall, 1912

Species of beetle

Liometophilus manni is a species of hidden snout weevil in the beetle family Curculionidae. It is found in North America.
