= Tyloderma punctatum =

Scientific classification
- Domain: Eukaryota
- Kingdom: Animalia
- Phylum: Arthropoda
- Class: Insecta
- Order: Coleoptera
- Suborder: Polyphaga
- Infraorder: Cucujiformia
- Family: Curculionidae
- Genus: Tyloderma
- Species: T. punctatum

Binomial name
- Tyloderma punctatum Casey, 1884

Species of beetle

Tyloderma punctatum is a species of hidden snout weevil in the beetle family Curculionidae. It is found in North America.
