= Gerstaeckeria hubbardi =

Scientific classification
- Kingdom: Animalia
- Phylum: Arthropoda
- Class: Insecta
- Order: Coleoptera
- Suborder: Polyphaga
- Infraorder: Cucujiformia
- Family: Curculionidae
- Genus: Gerstaeckeria
- Species: G. hubbardi

Binomial name
- Gerstaeckeria hubbardi (LeConte, 1880)

Synonyms
- Acalles dilatatus Casey, 1895

Species of beetle

Gerstaeckeria hubbardi is a species of hidden snout weevil in the beetle family Curculionidae.
