= Gerstaeckeria nobilis =

Scientific classification
- Kingdom: Animalia
- Phylum: Arthropoda
- Class: Insecta
- Order: Coleoptera
- Suborder: Polyphaga
- Infraorder: Cucujiformia
- Family: Curculionidae
- Genus: Gerstaeckeria
- Species: G. nobilis

Binomial name
- Gerstaeckeria nobilis (LeConte, 1876)

Species of beetle

Gerstaeckeria nobilis is a species of hidden snout weevil in the beetle family Curculionidae. It is found in North America.
