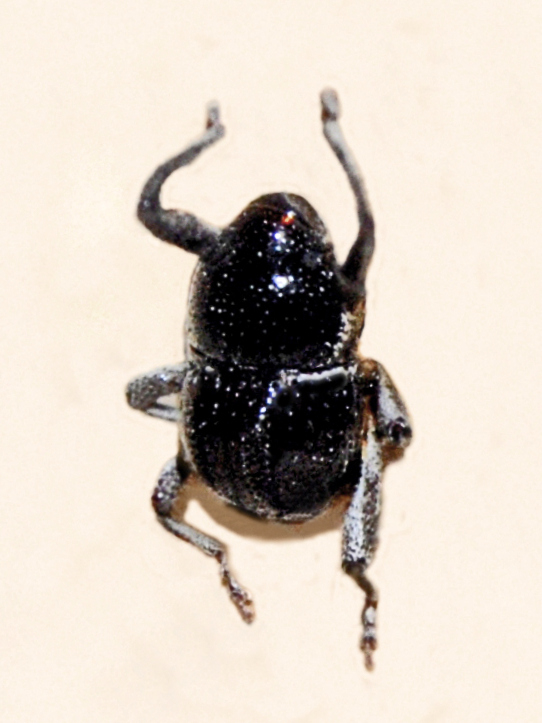
- Asytesta doriae

Scientific classification
- Kingdom: Animalia
- Phylum: Arthropoda
- Class: Insecta
- Order: Coleoptera
- Suborder: Polyphaga
- Infraorder: Cucujiformia
- Family: Curculionidae
- Subfamily: Cryptorhynchinae
- Genus: Asytesta; Pascoe, 1865

Synonyms
- Zygara Pascoe, 1885

= Asytesta =

Genus of beetles

Asytesta is a genus of beetles belonging to the family Curculionidae.

== Species ==
Species within this genus include:

- Asytesta antica
- Asytesta arachnopus
- Asytesta aucta
- Asytesta bivirgata
- Asytesta brevipennis
- Asytesta circulifera
- Asytesta definita
- Asytesta doriae
- Asytesta dorsalis
- Asytesta dubia
- Asytesta eudyasmoides
- Asytesta gestroi
- Asytesta granulifera
- Asytesta humeralis
- Asytesta lugubris
- Asytesta maura
- Asytesta philippinica
- Asytesta propinqua
- Asytesta rata
- Asytesta sejuncta
- Asytesta setipes
- Asytesta signata
- Asytesta trivittata
- Asytesta verecunda
- Asytesta versuta
- Asytesta vittata
- Asytesta ypsilon
