= Xenosacalles =

Scientific classification
- Kingdom: Animalia
- Phylum: Arthropoda
- Clade: Pancrustacea
- Class: Insecta
- Order: Coleoptera
- Suborder: Polyphaga
- Infraorder: Cucujiformia
- Family: Curculionidae
- Subfamily: Cryptorhynchinae
- Genus: Xenosacalles; Stüben, 2024
- Species: X. irlandikos

Binomial name
- Xenosacalles irlandikos Stüben, Clarke & Anderson, 2024

Species of weevil

Xenosacalles irlandikos, the fence-climber acalles, is a species of weevil. It is the only species in the genus Xenosacalles. It was discovered in Northern Ireland, but is believed to be introduced there. It has also been found in Cornwall.
