= Gerstaeckeria unicolor =

Scientific classification
- Domain: Eukaryota
- Kingdom: Animalia
- Phylum: Arthropoda
- Class: Insecta
- Order: Coleoptera
- Suborder: Polyphaga
- Infraorder: Cucujiformia
- Family: Curculionidae
- Genus: Gerstaeckeria
- Species: G. unicolor

Binomial name
- Gerstaeckeria unicolor Fisher, 1928

Species of beetle

Gerstaeckeria unicolor is a species of hidden snout weevil in the beetle family Curculionidae.
