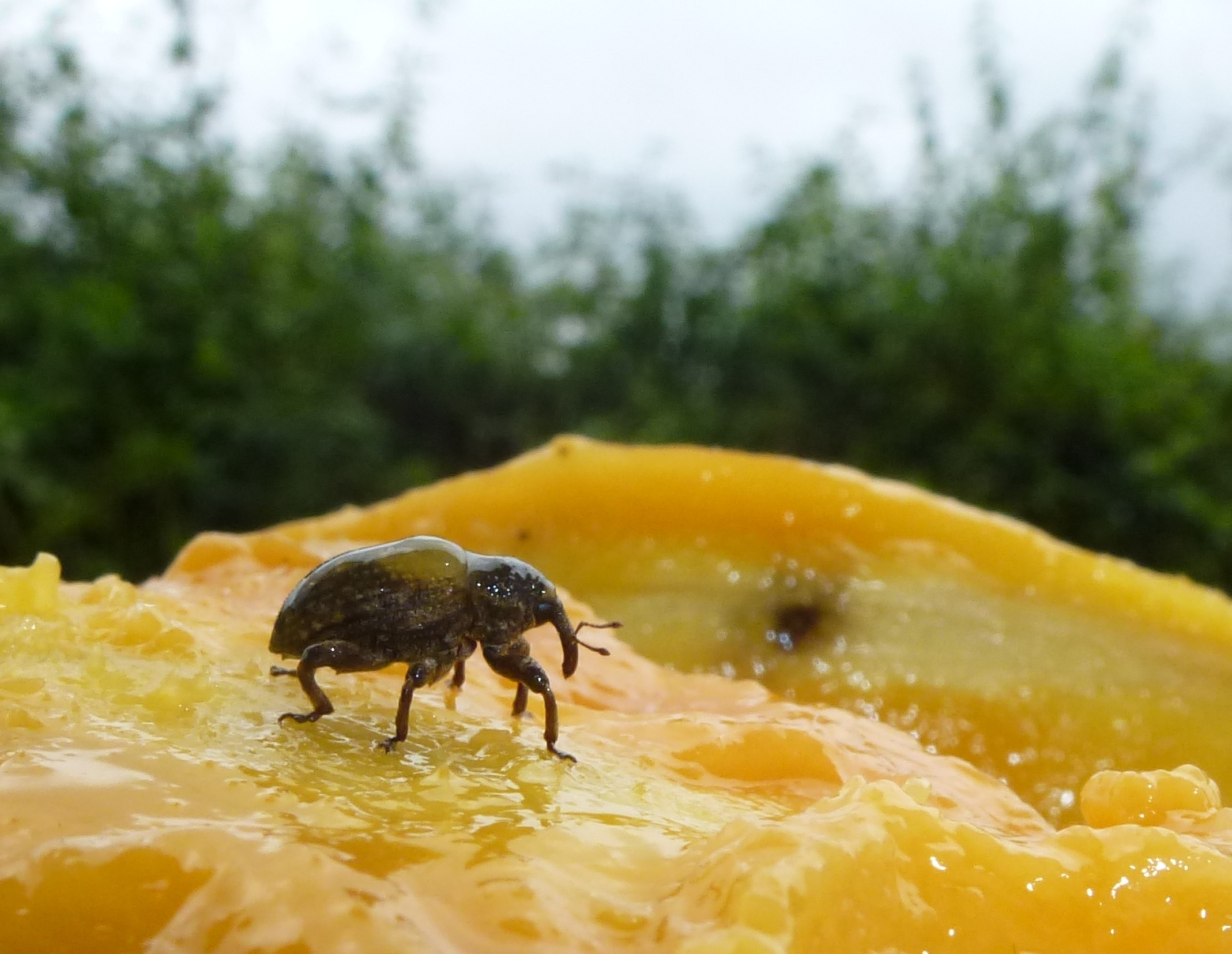

Scientific classification
- Domain: Eukaryota
- Kingdom: Animalia
- Phylum: Arthropoda
- Class: Insecta
- Order: Coleoptera
- Suborder: Polyphaga
- Infraorder: Cucujiformia
- Family: Curculionidae
- Genus: Sternochetus
- Species: S. mangiferae

Binomial name
- Sternochetus mangiferae (Fabricius, 1775)

Synonyms
- Cryptorhynchus mangiferae Fabricius

= Sternochetus mangiferae =

Species of beetle

Sternochetus mangiferae is a weevil commonly known as the mango seed weevil, mango stone weevil, or mango weevil. It is a compact weevil typical of the Cryptorhynchinae. It was first described in 1775 in the genus Curculio. The adults are 7.5-9.5 mm long and 4 mm in width.

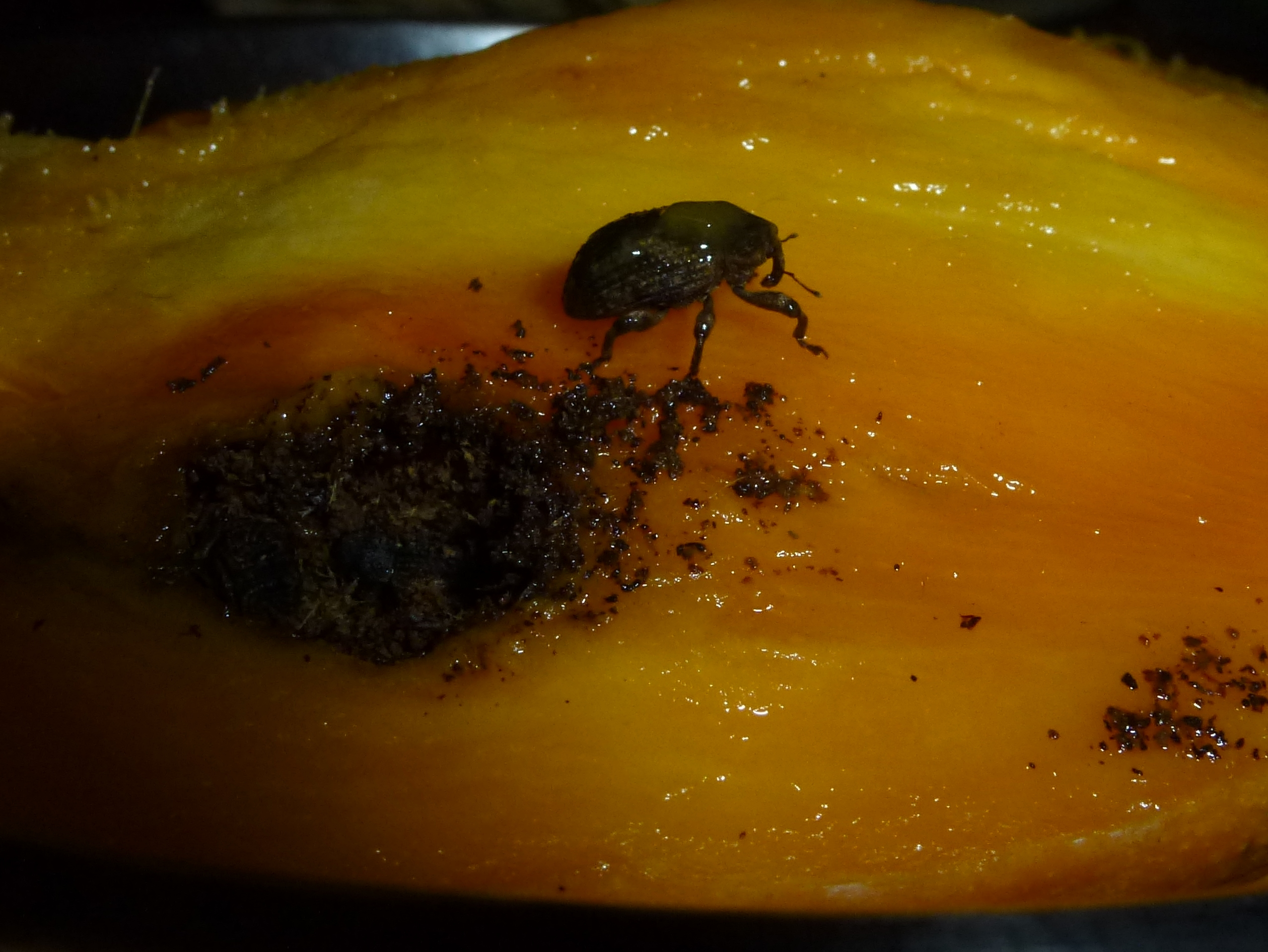
Adult coming out of mango

Their colour varies and they may be covered with black, greyish, reddish, or yellowish scales. In Australia, adult weevils are dark brown to black with grey markings. When disturbed, an adult presses its legs to its body, and fits its beak into a ventral groove. Females have an elevated ridge at the pygidial apex, while it is rounded in the male. The adults are not strong fliers and are not found far from fallen fruit. New areas are infested by human transport of infested fruit. Eggs are elongated, creamy white, and covered by a protective brown coating with two tiny tails at one end. It is widespread and occurs in most countries, especially where mangoes are grown. The adult female lays eggs on the surface of the mango fruit. Larvae and pupae develop inside the fruit and adults emerge, cutting their way out of the seed and pericarp after the fruit falls and decays. Adults enter a diapause until the next fruiting season. The mango seed weevil is considered a pest on mangoes.

== Distribution ==
Mangoes (Mangifera indica) originated in Myanmar and north-east India, where S. mangiferae probably originated. This species is distributed in nearly all of the world's mango-growing regions: Australasia and Oceania, Asia, Africa, North America (Hawaii), Caribbean, South America (French Guiana and Brazil). It does not occur in the Canary Islands (Spain), Italy, Israel, Egypt, and Western Australia, where mangoes are grown to a limited but increasing extent.

== Control ==
A study from Australia reported that the weaver ant, Oecophylla smaragdina, acted as predator and deterrent to limit S. mangiferae damage on fruit. A baculovirus is also known to be a natural enemy of this weevil.
