= Tyloderma fragariae =

Scientific classification
- Domain: Eukaryota
- Kingdom: Animalia
- Phylum: Arthropoda
- Class: Insecta
- Order: Coleoptera
- Suborder: Polyphaga
- Infraorder: Cucujiformia
- Family: Curculionidae
- Genus: Tyloderma
- Species: T. fragariae

Binomial name
- Tyloderma fragariae (Riley, 1871)

Species of beetle

Tyloderma fragariae, the strawberry crown borer, is a species of hidden snout weevil in the beetle family Curculionidae.
