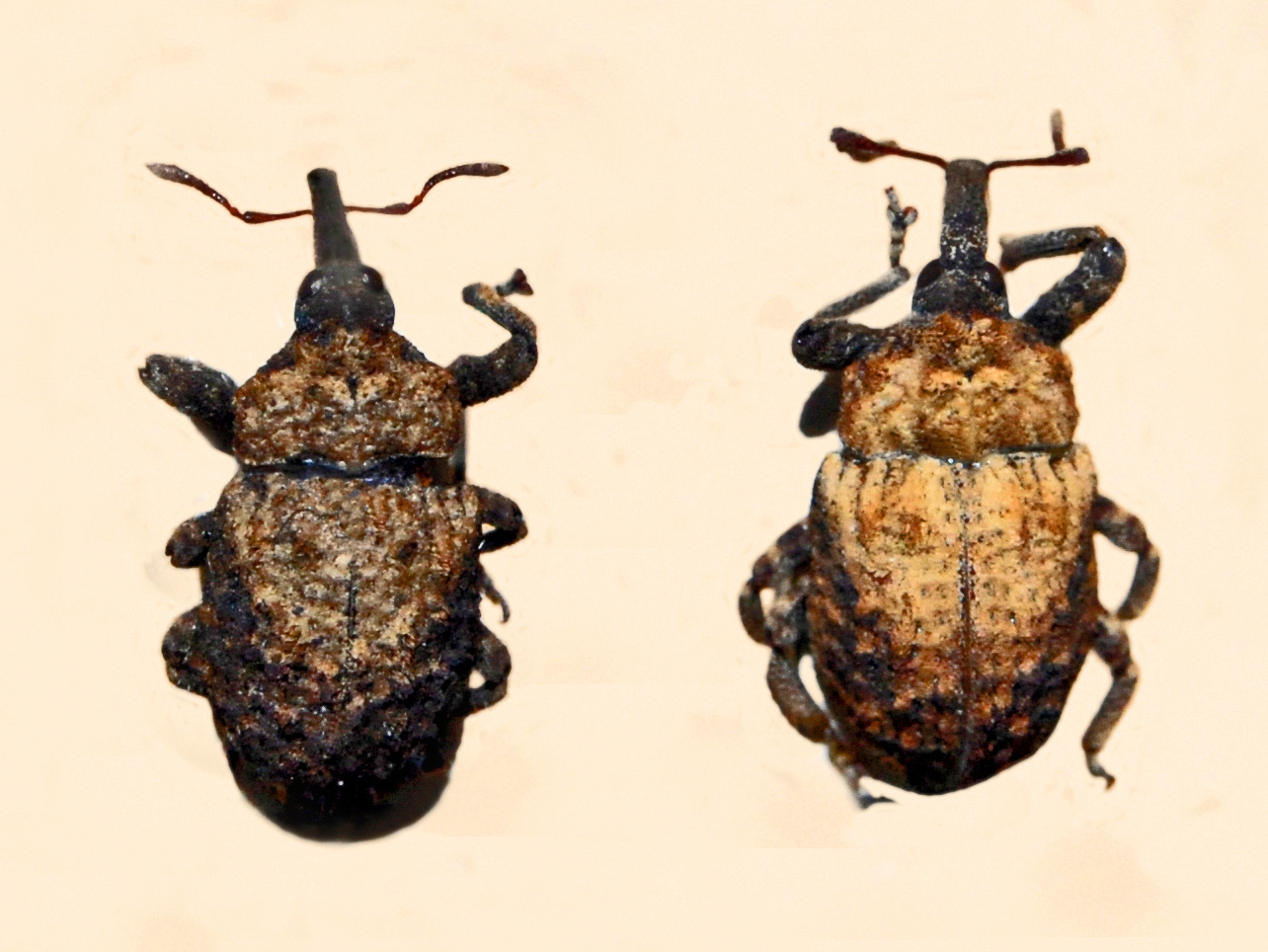

Scientific classification
- Kingdom: Animalia
- Phylum: Arthropoda
- Class: Insecta
- Order: Coleoptera
- Suborder: Polyphaga
- Infraorder: Cucujiformia
- Family: Curculionidae
- Genus: Pseudoporopterus
- Species: P. simulator

Binomial name
- Pseudoporopterus simulator (Roelofs 1875)

Synonyms
- Simulatacalles simulator (Roelofs 1875)

= Pseudoporopterus simulator =

Species of beetle

Pseudoporopterus simulator is a species of weevils belonging to the family Curculionidae.
