= Hohonus lacteicollis =

Scientific classification
- Domain: Eukaryota
- Kingdom: Animalia
- Phylum: Arthropoda
- Class: Insecta
- Order: Coleoptera
- Suborder: Polyphaga
- Infraorder: Cucujiformia
- Family: Curculionidae
- Genus: Hohonus
- Species: H. lacteicollis

Binomial name
- Hohonus lacteicollis (Champion, 1906)

Species of beetle

Hohonus lacteicollis is a species of hidden snout weevil in the beetle family Curculionidae. It is found in North America.
