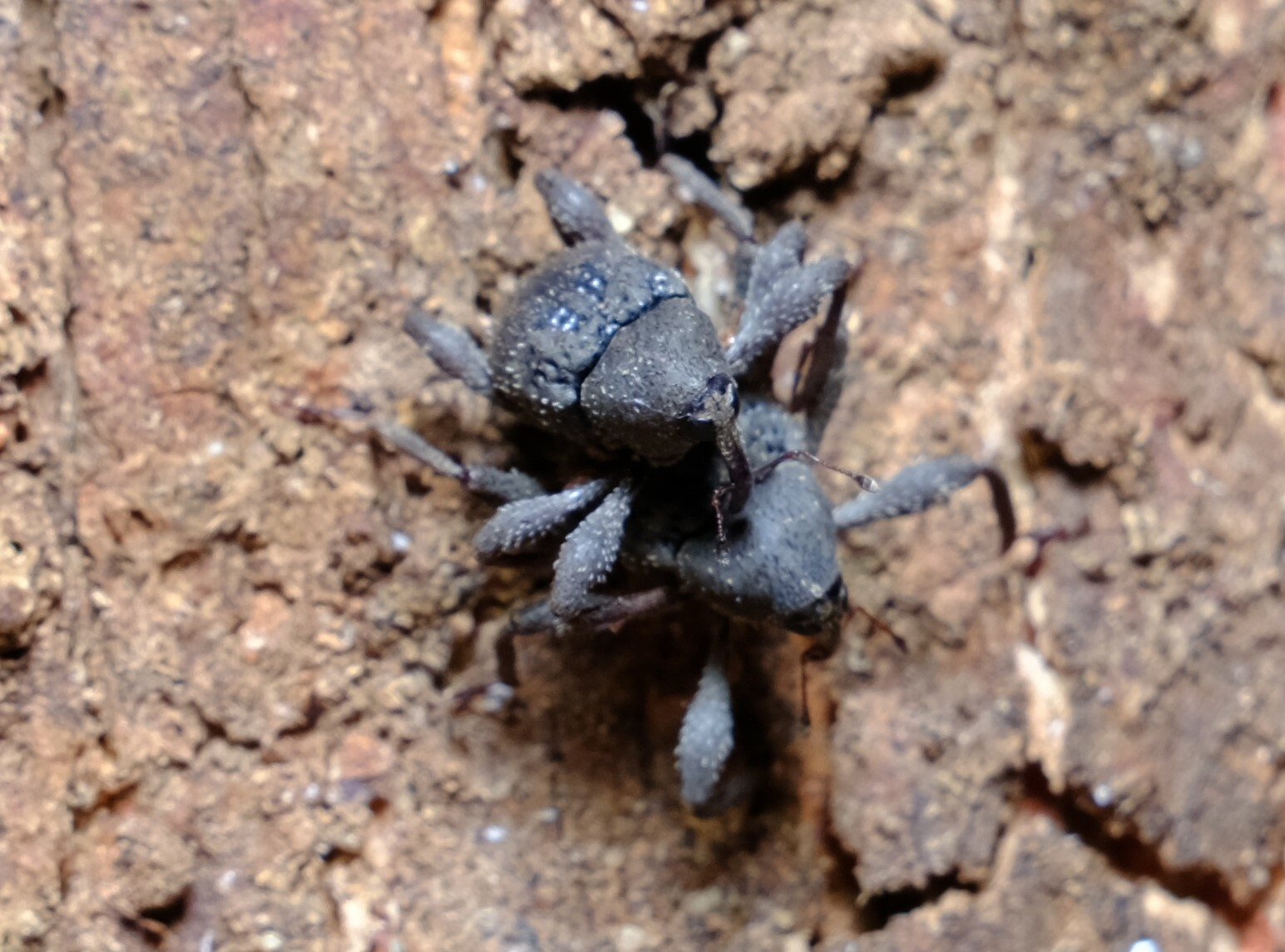
- In Australia

Scientific classification
- Kingdom: Animalia
- Phylum: Arthropoda
- Class: Insecta
- Order: Coleoptera
- Suborder: Polyphaga
- Infraorder: Cucujiformia
- Family: Curculionidae
- Genus: Onidistus
- Species: O. araneus

Binomial name
- Onidistus araneus Pascoe, 1870

Synonyms
- Onidistus odiosus Pascoe, 1870

= Onidistus araneus =

Species of weevil

Onidistus araneus is a species of weevil in the beetle family Curculionidae. It is found in eastern Australia.
