= Gerstaeckeria porosa =

Scientific classification
- Kingdom: Animalia
- Phylum: Arthropoda
- Class: Insecta
- Order: Coleoptera
- Suborder: Polyphaga
- Infraorder: Cucujiformia
- Family: Curculionidae
- Genus: Gerstaeckeria
- Species: G. porosa

Binomial name
- Gerstaeckeria porosa (LeConte, 1876)

Synonyms
- Gerstaeckeria tessellata Pierce, 1912

Species of beetle

Gerstaeckeria porosa is a species of hidden snout weevil in the beetle family Curculionidae.
