= Gerstaeckeria knullorum =

Scientific classification
- Domain: Eukaryota
- Kingdom: Animalia
- Phylum: Arthropoda
- Class: Insecta
- Order: Coleoptera
- Suborder: Polyphaga
- Infraorder: Cucujiformia
- Family: Curculionidae
- Genus: Gerstaeckeria
- Species: G. knullorum

Binomial name
- Gerstaeckeria knullorum (Sleeper, 1954)

Species of beetle

Gerstaeckeria knullorum is a species of hidden snout weevil in the beetle family Curculionidae. It is found in North America.
