= Peracalles =

Scientific classification
- Kingdom: Animalia
- Phylum: Arthropoda
- Class: Insecta
- Order: Coleoptera
- Suborder: Polyphaga
- Infraorder: Cucujiformia
- Family: Curculionidae
- Genus: Peracalles; Kissinger, 1964

Genus of beetles

Peracalles is a genus of hidden snout weevils in the beetle family Curculionidae. There are at least two described species in Peracalles.

== Species ==
These two species belong to the genus Peracalles:

- Peracalles pectoralis (LeConte, 1876)
- Peracalles ventrosus (LeConte, 1878)
