= Pseudomus =

Scientific classification
- Domain: Eukaryota
- Kingdom: Animalia
- Phylum: Arthropoda
- Class: Insecta
- Order: Coleoptera
- Suborder: Polyphaga
- Infraorder: Cucujiformia
- Family: Curculionidae
- Genus: Pseudomus; Schönherr, 1837

Genus of beetles

Pseudomus is a genus of hidden snout weevils in the beetle family Curculionidae. There are more than 20 described species in Pseudomus.

== Species ==
These 26 species belong to the genus Pseudomus:

- Pseudomus albosparsus Chevrolat, 1880
- Pseudomus apiatus Boheman, 1844
- Pseudomus bimaculatus Suffrian, 1872
- Pseudomus bohemani Kuschel, 1955
- Pseudomus cacuminatus Boheman, 1844
- Pseudomus deltoides Buchanan, 1947
- Pseudomus fairmairei Chevrolat, 1880
- Pseudomus fistulosus Kuschel, 1955
- Pseudomus inflatus LeConte, 1885
- Pseudomus maximus Suffrian, 1872
- Pseudomus mexicanus Chevrolat, 1880
- Pseudomus militaris Schoenherr, 1837
- Pseudomus nitidicutis Chevrolat, 1880
- Pseudomus notatus Boheman, 1837
- Pseudomus parallelus Hustache, 1930
- Pseudomus proximus Chevrolat, 1880
- Pseudomus punctatissimus Chevrolat, 1880
- Pseudomus rugifer Suffrian, 1872
- Pseudomus sedentarius (Say, 1831)
- Pseudomus semicribratus Boheman, 1844
- Pseudomus singularis Chevrolat, 1880
- Pseudomus trisignatus Kuschel, 1955
- Pseudomus trochilus Prena & Whitehead, 2012
- Pseudomus truncatus LeConte, 1876
- Pseudomus turgidus Klug, 1850
- Pseudomus viduus Boheman, 1837
