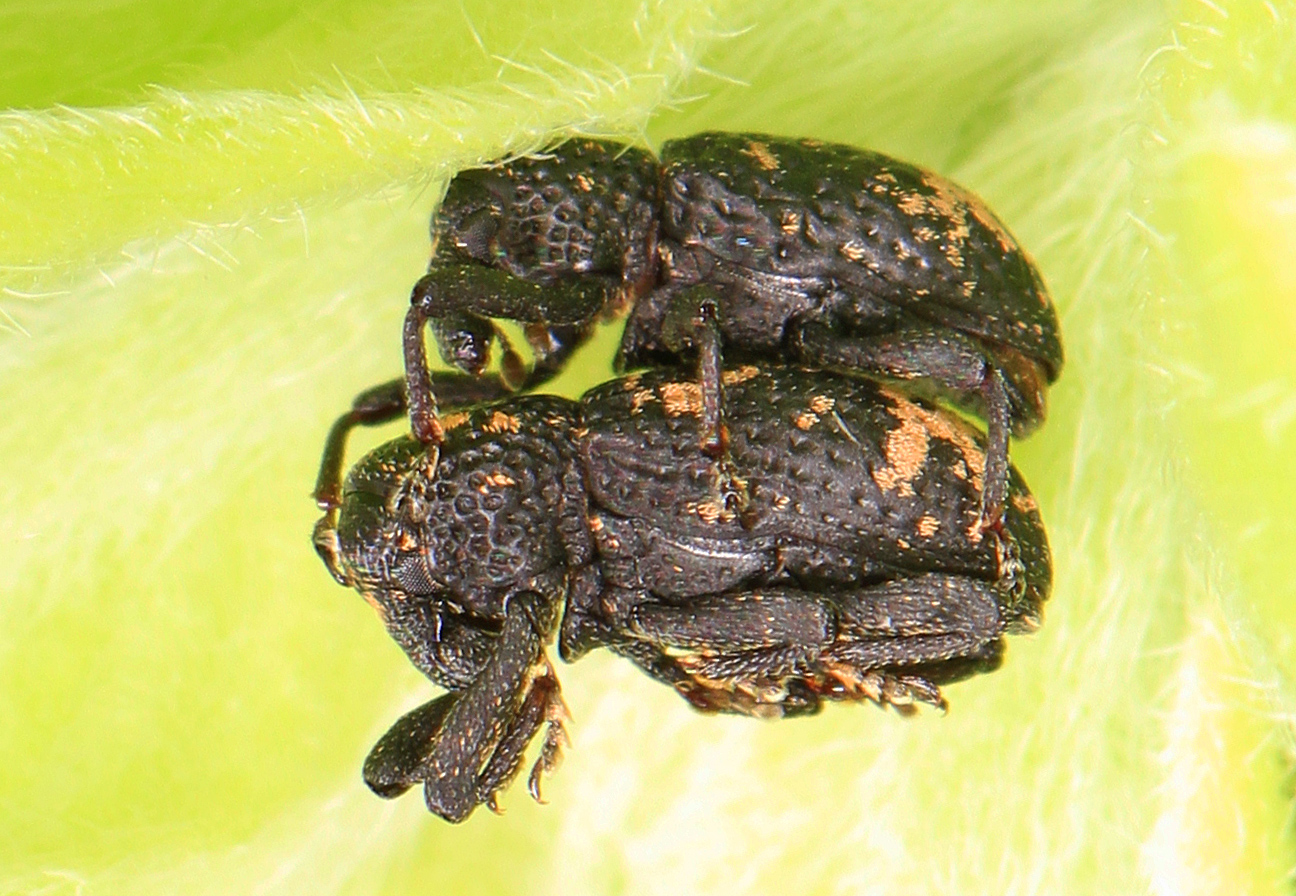
- Tyloderma foveolatum, Virginia

Scientific classification
- Domain: Eukaryota
- Kingdom: Animalia
- Phylum: Arthropoda
- Class: Insecta
- Order: Coleoptera
- Suborder: Polyphaga
- Infraorder: Cucujiformia
- Family: Curculionidae
- Subtribe: Cryptorhynchina
- Genus: Tyloderma; Say, 1831

Synonyms
- Analcis Say, 1831

= Tyloderma =

Genus of beetles

Tyloderma is a genus of hidden snout weevils in the beetle family Curculionidae. They are found in North, Central, and South America.

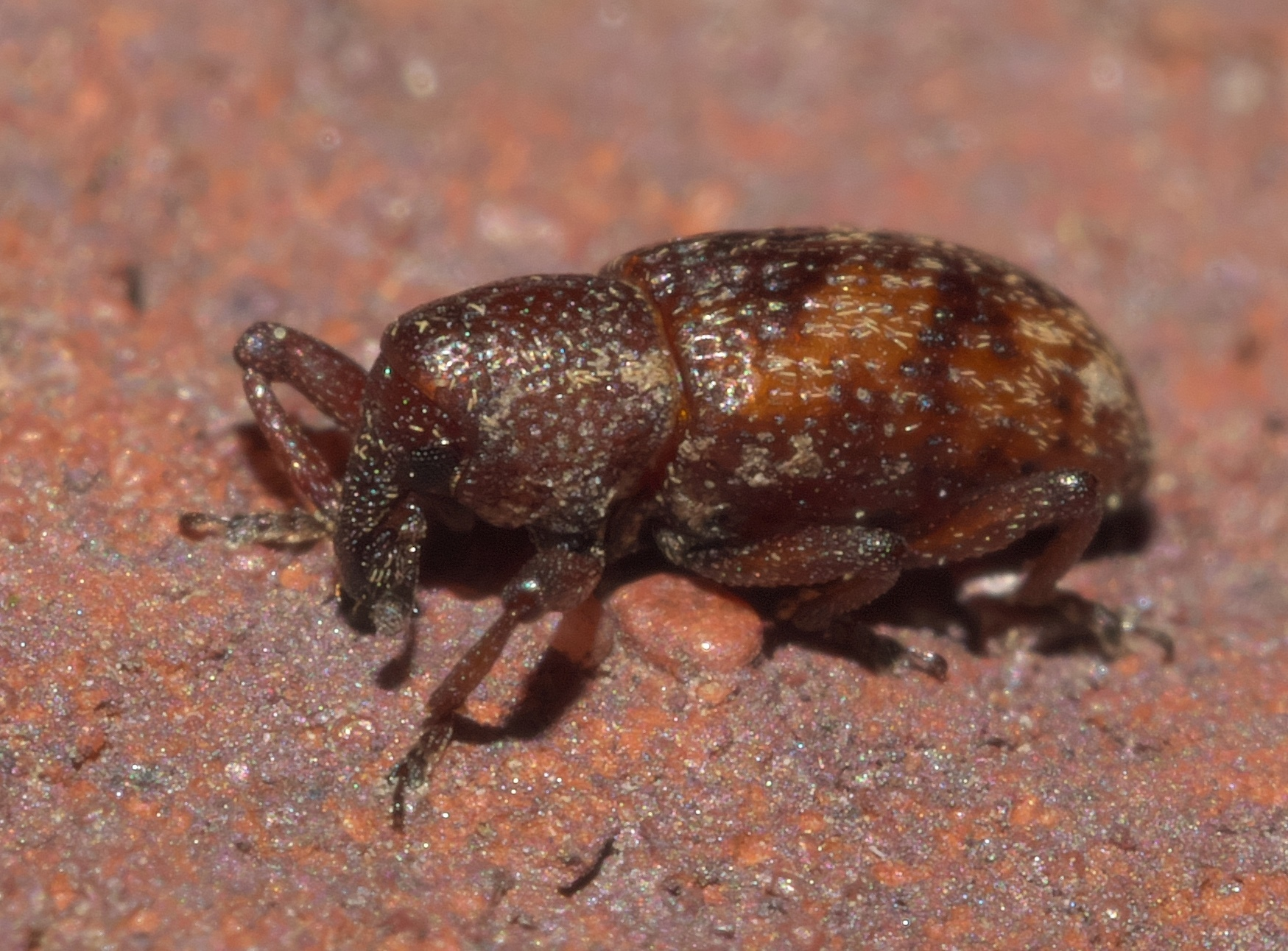
Tyloderma sphaerocarpae, Oklahoma

== Species ==
These 77 species belong to the genus Tyloderma:

- Tyloderma aeneum Hustache, 1939
- Tyloderma aeneotinctum Champion, 1906
- Tyloderma aereoides Wibmer, 1981
- Tyloderma aereum (Say, 1832)
- Tyloderma affine Wibmer, 1989
- Tyloderma albidomaculatum Wibmer, 1989
- Tyloderma angustulum Casey, 1892
- Tyloderma aquaticum Wibmer, 1981
- Tyloderma asclepiasae Sleeper, 1955
- Tyloderma baridium LeConte, 1876
- Tyloderma baridoidium Rye, 1878
- Tyloderma brassicae Costa Lima, 1938
- Tyloderma brevisquameum Wibmer, 1989
- Tyloderma californicum Wibmer, 1981
- Tyloderma capitale Wibmer, 1981
- Tyloderma caseyi Wibmer, 1981
- Tyloderma circumcaribbeum Wibmer, 1981
- Tyloderma contusum Casey, 1892
- Tyloderma cubense Wibmer, 1989
- Tyloderma cupreum Hustache, 1940
- Tyloderma curvisete Wibmer, 1989
- Tyloderma danforthi Wolcott, 1951
- Tyloderma diversum Wibmer, 1989
- Tyloderma elegantulum Hustache, 1939
- Tyloderma elongatum Wibmer, 1989
- Tyloderma expansum Wibmer, 1989
- Tyloderma fasciatus Hustache, 1936
- Tyloderma foveolatum (Say, 1832)
- Tyloderma foveostriatum Voss, 1943
- Tyloderma fragariae LeConte & Horn, 1876
- Tyloderma frontale Wibmer, 1989
- Tyloderma fulvicornis Hustache, 1936
- Tyloderma glabrescens Wibmer, 1989
- Tyloderma hustachei Wibmer, 1989
- Tyloderma inaequalis Voss, 1943
- Tyloderma innotatum Wibmer, 1989
- Tyloderma insulicola Wibmer, 1989
- Tyloderma lacordairei Wibmer, 1989
- Tyloderma laevicollis Blatchley, 1919
- Tyloderma laporteae Wibmer, 1981
- Tyloderma lecontei Wibmer, 1981
- Tyloderma lepidogramma Wibmer, 1989
- Tyloderma longisquameum Wibmer, 1989
- Tyloderma longus LeConte, 1876
- Tyloderma maculata Blatchley & Leng, 1916
- Tyloderma marshalli Wibmer, 1981
- Tyloderma metallicum Voss, 1943
- Tyloderma minimum Blatchley, 1920
- Tyloderma morbillosus LeConte & Horn, 1876
- Tyloderma myriophylli Wibmer, 1981
- Tyloderma natator Wibmer, 1989
- Tyloderma neomorbillosum Wibmer, 1981
- Tyloderma nigromaculatum Hustache, 1939
- Tyloderma nigrum Casey, 1884
- Tyloderma obliquatum Hustache, 1939
- Tyloderma obrieni Wibmer, 1989
- Tyloderma oenotherae Wibmer, 1981
- Tyloderma pallidum Wibmer, 1989
- Tyloderma parvulum O'Brien & Wibmer, 1982
- Tyloderma pilosellum O'Brien & Wibmer, 1982
- Tyloderma pseudaereum Wibmer, 1981
- Tyloderma pseudofoveolatum Wibmer, 1981
- Tyloderma punctatum Casey, 1884
- Tyloderma rufescens Casey, 1892
- Tyloderma sayi Wibmer, 1989
- Tyloderma schoenherri Wibmer, 1989
- Tyloderma setaria Faust, 1896
- Tyloderma simile Wibmer, 1989
- Tyloderma sphaerocarpae Wibmer, 1981
- Tyloderma striata Pascoe, 1881
- Tyloderma subfasciatum Wibmer, 1989
- Tyloderma subpilosum Wibmer, 1989
- Tyloderma subpubescens Casey, 1892
- Tyloderma tuberculatum Wibmer, 1989
- Tyloderma variabile Wibmer, 1989
- Tyloderma variegatum LeConte & Horn, 1876
- Tyloderma wibmeri Prena, J., 2018
