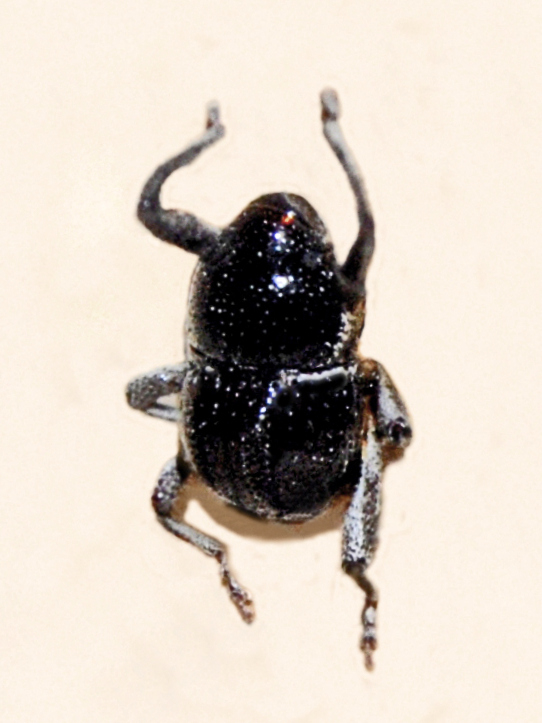
- Asytesta doriae from New Guinea. Museum specimen

Scientific classification
- Kingdom: Animalia
- Phylum: Arthropoda
- Clade: Pancrustacea
- Class: Insecta
- Order: Coleoptera
- Suborder: Polyphaga
- Infraorder: Cucujiformia
- Family: Curculionidae
- Genus: Asytesta
- Species: A. doriae

Binomial name
- Asytesta doriae Kirsch, 1879

Synonyms
- Zygara doriae – Pascoe, 1885

= Asytesta doriae =

Species of beetle

Asytesta doriae is a species of beetles belonging to the family Curculionidae.

== Taxonomy ==
Asytesta is now considered a senior synonym of Zygara and Zygara doriae is returned to its original combination with Asytesta.

== Etymology ==
The Latin species name doriae has been dedicated to the Italian naturalist Giacomo Doria by the German entomologist Theodor Franz Wilhelm Kirsch.

== Distribution ==
This species is endemic to the Papua New Guinea and is known only from the Yule Island.

== Description ==
Asytesta doriae can reach a length of 3.4–4.6 millimetres (0.13–0.18 in). Body is sub-globular, longer than broad, with a deep basal row of puncture on the elytra, a serrate prefemoral tooth, and light reddish-brown antennae and tarsi.
