= Zascelis =

Scientific classification
- Kingdom: Animalia
- Phylum: Arthropoda
- Class: Insecta
- Order: Coleoptera
- Suborder: Polyphaga
- Infraorder: Cucujiformia
- Family: Curculionidae
- Subtribe: Cryptorhynchina
- Genus: Zascelis; LeConte, 1876

Genus of beetles

Zascelis is a genus of hidden snout weevils in the beetle family Curculionidae. There are more than 80 described species in Zascelis.

== Species ==
These 86 species belong to the genus Zascelis:

- Zascelis affaber Champion, 1905
- Zascelis angusticollis Fiedler, 1948
- Zascelis appendiculata Fiedler, 1953
- Zascelis auricomata Fiedler, 1954
- Zascelis braccata Fiedler, 1954
- Zascelis brevicollis Champion, 1905
- Zascelis breyeri Kuschel, 1950
- Zascelis carinipennis Hustache, 1924
- Zascelis carinipes Champion, 1905
- Zascelis coarctirostris Fiedler, 1954
- Zascelis conicipennis Fiedler, 1948
- Zascelis consputus Fiedler, 1942
- Zascelis curvirostris Fiedler, 1954
- Zascelis cyclops Fiedler, 1948
- Zascelis dentipes Fiedler, 1954
- Zascelis discreta Fiedler, 1954
- Zascelis elongata Fiedler, 1954
- Zascelis erythrops Fiedler, 1954
- Zascelis excisa Fiedler, 1948
- Zascelis excisipennis Fiedler, 1948
- Zascelis extensa Fiedler, 1948
- Zascelis filicornis Fiedler, 1953
- Zascelis fissicostata Fiedler, 1953
- Zascelis flavidior Fiedler, 1942
- Zascelis flavopilosa Fiedler, 1948
- Zascelis fossulatifrons Fiedler, 1953
- Zascelis foveatifrons Fiedler, 1954
- Zascelis fraterna Fiedler, 1954
- Zascelis geminatus Champion, 1905
- Zascelis glabratoides Voss, 1940
- Zascelis glabratus Champion, 1905
- Zascelis glabriventris Fiedler, 1948
- Zascelis grisescens Fiedler, 1954
- Zascelis hamifera Fiedler, 1948
- Zascelis infirma Fiedler, 1948
- Zascelis ingrata Fiedler, 1954
- Zascelis irrorata LeConte, 1876
- Zascelis laeviceps Fiedler, 1948
- Zascelis laevirostris Fiedler, 1948
- Zascelis lata Fiedler, 1948
- Zascelis latecarinata Fiedler, 1948
- Zascelis latifrons Fiedler, 1948
- Zascelis linearis Fiedler, 1948
- Zascelis lobata Fiedler, 1954
- Zascelis longirostris Fiedler, 1954
- Zascelis macera Fiedler, 1954
- Zascelis macrops Fiedler, 1948
- Zascelis marginata Fiedler, 1948
- Zascelis marginaticollis Fiedler, 1948
- Zascelis marginella Fiedler, 1948
- Zascelis microps Fiedler, 1948
- Zascelis modesta Fiedler, 1954
- Zascelis navicularis Fiedler, 1954
- Zascelis nepticula Fiedler, 1954
- Zascelis notandirostris Fiedler, 1948
- Zascelis oblonga Horn, 1895
- Zascelis oblongovalis Fiedler, 1948
- Zascelis ovalis Fiedler, 1948
- Zascelis ovatula Fiedler, 1954
- Zascelis parvicollis Fiedler, 1948
- Zascelis protensa Fiedler, 1954
- Zascelis punctatocostalis Fiedler, 1948
- Zascelis pusilla Fiedler, 1948
- Zascelis recticollis Fiedler, 1948
- Zascelis rectipennis Fiedler, 1954
- Zascelis rhomboidalis Fiedler, 1948
- Zascelis rudicollis Fiedler, 1948
- Zascelis rufipennis Fiedler, 1948
- Zascelis rufipes Fiedler, 1948
- Zascelis rugosa Champion, 1905
- Zascelis semiplanata Fiedler, 1948
- Zascelis serripes Leconte, 1876
- Zascelis sexualis Fiedler, 1948
- Zascelis sororcula Fiedler, 1954
- Zascelis speculifera Fiedler, 1948
- Zascelis squamigera Leconte, 1876
- Zascelis stenosicollis Fiedler, 1954
- Zascelis strigosa Fiedler, 1954
- Zascelis striolatus Fiedler, 1942
- Zascelis subelongata Fiedler, 1954
- Zascelis subobtusa Fiedler, 1948
- Zascelis sulcatocostata Fiedler, 1954
- Zascelis sulcifrons Champion, 1905
- Zascelis suturalis Fiedler, 1948
- Zascelis truncata Fiedler, 1948
- Zascelis ventralis Fiedler, 1948
