= Rhynchus (Greece) =

Rhynchus or Rhynchos (Ancient Greek: Ῥύγχος) was a town of ancient Acarnania near Stratus, of uncertain site.
