= Hohonus =

Scientific classification
- Domain: Eukaryota
- Kingdom: Animalia
- Phylum: Arthropoda
- Class: Insecta
- Order: Coleoptera
- Suborder: Polyphaga
- Infraorder: Cucujiformia
- Family: Curculionidae
- Tribe: Gasterocercini
- Genus: Hohonus; Kissinger, 1964

Genus of beetles

Hohonus is a genus of hidden snout weevils in the beetle family Curculionidae. There are at least two described species in Hohonus.

== Species ==
These two species belong to the genus Hohonus:

- Hohonus lacteicollis (Champion, 1906)
- Hohonus sturio Anderson, 1994
