= Gerstaeckeria =

Scientific classification
- Domain: Eukaryota
- Kingdom: Animalia
- Phylum: Arthropoda
- Class: Insecta
- Order: Coleoptera
- Suborder: Polyphaga
- Infraorder: Cucujiformia
- Family: Curculionidae
- Genus: Gerstaeckeria; Champion, 1905

Genus of beetles

Gerstaeckeria is a genus of cactus weevils in the beetle family Curculionidae. There are more than 40 described species in Gerstaeckeria.

== Species ==
These 47 species belong to the genus Gerstaeckeria:

- Gerstaeckeria alternata Pierce, 1912
- Gerstaeckeria barringtonensis Van Dyke, 1953
- Gerstaeckeria basalis (LeConte, 1876)
- Gerstaeckeria bifasciata Champion, 1905
- Gerstaeckeria cactophaga Pierce, 1912
- Gerstaeckeria clathrata Pierce, 1912
- Gerstaeckeria crassirostris Hustache, 1930
- Gerstaeckeria cruciata Champion, 1905
- Gerstaeckeria cubaecola Fisher, 1928
- Gerstaeckeria curvilineata Champion, 1910
- Gerstaeckeria dilatata Casey
- Gerstaeckeria doddi Fisher, 1925
- Gerstaeckeria elegans Fisher, 1928
- Gerstaeckeria fasciata Pierce, 1912
- Gerstaeckeria galapagoensis Van Dyke, 1953
- Gerstaeckeria guadelupensis Hustache, 1936
- Gerstaeckeria hoodensis Van Dyke, 1953
- Gerstaeckeria hubbardi (LeConte, 1880)
- Gerstaeckeria indistincta O'Brien, 1970
- Gerstaeckeria inflata Hustache, 1930
- Gerstaeckeria infrequens O'Brien, 1970
- Gerstaeckeria insulana Fisher, 1928
- Gerstaeckeria knullorum (Sleeper, 1954)
- Gerstaeckeria lacti Champion, 1905
- Gerstaeckeria lecontei O'Brien, 1970
- Gerstaeckeria leptocaulis O'Brien, 1970
- Gerstaeckeria leseleuci Champion, 1905
- Gerstaeckeria lineatocollis Champion, 1910
- Gerstaeckeria minuta Hustache, 1930
- Gerstaeckeria mutillaria Champion, 1905
- Gerstaeckeria nobilis (LeConte, 1876)
- Gerstaeckeria obrieni Sleeper, 1971
- Gerstaeckeria opuntiae Pierce, 1912
- Gerstaeckeria parallelus Hustache, 1930
- Gerstaeckeria parvula Hustache, 1930
- Gerstaeckeria peruana O'Brien, 1969
- Gerstaeckeria porosa (LeConte, 1876)
- Gerstaeckeria profusa (Casey, 1892)
- Gerstaeckeria rotundata Hustache, 1930
- Gerstaeckeria semicribatus (Boheman, 1844)
- Gerstaeckeria seymourensis Van Dyke, 1953
- Gerstaeckeria tessellata Pierce, 1912
- Gerstaeckeria tolucana Champion, 1910
- Gerstaeckeria tricolor O'Brien, 1970
- Gerstaeckeria turbida (LeConte, 1876)
- Gerstaeckeria turpis Pierce, 1912
- Gerstaeckeria unicolor Fisher, 1928
