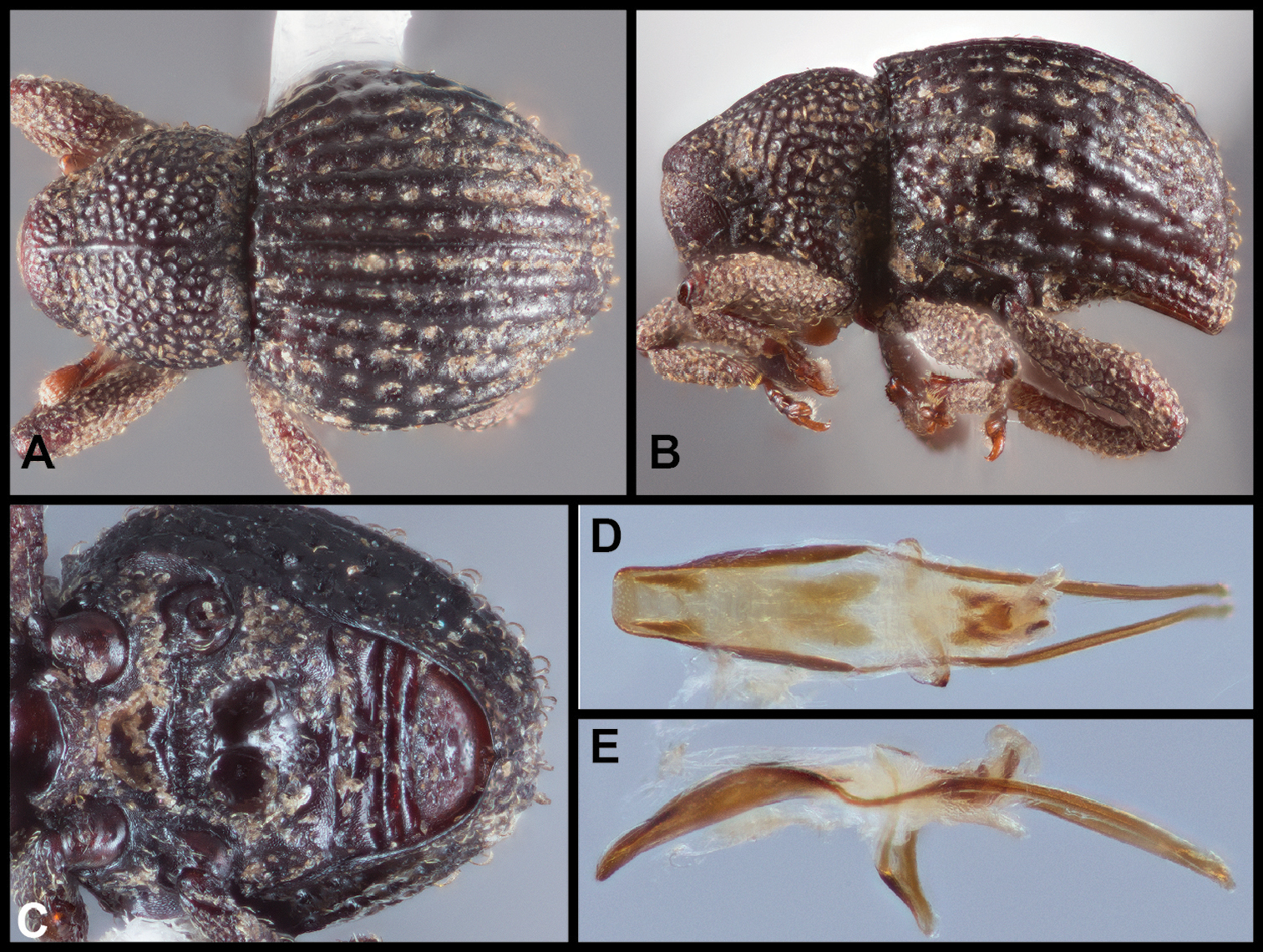
- Eurhoptus aenigmaticus

Scientific classification
- Domain: Eukaryota
- Kingdom: Animalia
- Phylum: Arthropoda
- Class: Insecta
- Order: Coleoptera
- Suborder: Polyphaga
- Infraorder: Cucujiformia
- Family: Curculionidae
- Genus: Eurhoptus; LeConte, 1876

= Eurhoptus =

Genus of beetles

Eurhoptus is a genus of hidden snout weevils in the family of beetles known as Curculionidae. There are at least eight described species in Eurhoptus.

In 2018, researchers Robert S. Anderson and Michael S. Caterino revised the genus Eurhoptus, resurrecting the species E. curtus and adding five new species, E. aenigmaticus, E. cariniventris, E. imbricatus, E. occidentalis, and E. rileyi.

== Species ==
These species belong to the genus Eurhoptus:

- Eurhoptus aenigmaticus Anderson & Caterino, 2018
- Eurhoptus cariniventris Anderson & Caterino, 2018
- Eurhoptus curtus (Hamilton, 1893) (resurrected name, 2018)
- Eurhoptus imbricatus Anderson & Caterino, 2018
- Eurhoptus occidentalis Anderson & Caterino, 2018
- Eurhoptus pyriformis LeConte, 1876^{i c b}
- Eurhoptus rileyi Anderson & Caterino, 2018
- Eurhoptus sordidus (LeConte, 1876)^{i c}Data sources: i = ITIS, c = Catalogue of Life, g = GBIF, b = Bugguide.net
