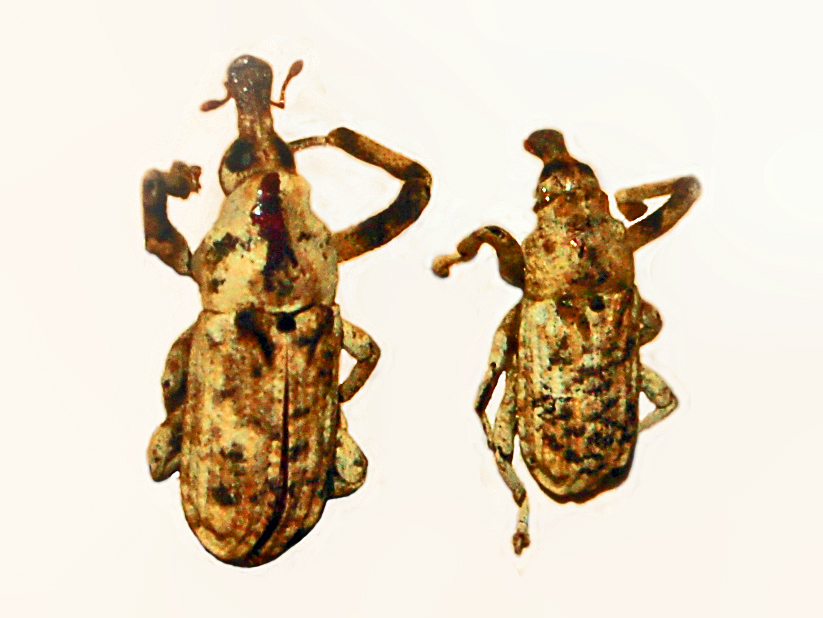
- Gasterocercus anatinus from New Guinea

Scientific classification
- Kingdom: Animalia
- Phylum: Arthropoda
- Class: Insecta
- Order: Coleoptera
- Suborder: Polyphaga
- Infraorder: Cucujiformia
- Family: Curculionidae
- Subfamily: Molytinae
- Genus: Gasterocercus; Laporte de Castelnau & Brullé, 1828

= Gasterocercus =

Genus of beetles

Gasterocercus is a genus of beetles belonging to the true weevil family.

== List of Species ==
- Gasterocercus albifrons
- Gasterocercus anatinus
- Gasterocercus anthriboides
- Gasterocercus asper
- Gasterocercus bifasciatus
- Gasterocercus clitellarius
- Gasterocercus cristulatus
- Gasterocercus dejanii
- Gasterocercus dejeanii
- Gasterocercus depressirostris
- Gasterocercus dorsalis
- Gasterocercus dubitabilis
- Gasterocercus dumerilii
- Gasterocercus enokivorus
- Gasterocercus erinaceus
- Gasterocercus exiguus
- Gasterocercus hispanicus
- Gasterocercus horridus
- Gasterocercus hypsophilus
- Gasterocercus lateralis
- Gasterocercus latirostris
- Gasterocercus latreillei
- Gasterocercus longimanus
- Gasterocercus longipes
- Gasterocercus melancholicus
- Gasterocercus mexicanus
- Gasterocercus nigroaeneus
- Gasterocercus nocturnus
- Gasterocercus oblitus
- Gasterocercus onizo
- Gasterocercus petulans
- Gasterocercus plumipes
- Gasterocercus propugnator
- Gasterocercus quinquepunctatus
- Gasterocercus richteri
- Gasterocercus scabrirostris
- Gasterocercus semicircularis
- Gasterocercus setosus
- Gasterocercus singularis
- Gasterocercus stratum
- Gasterocercus tamanukii
- Gasterocercus variegatus
