= Calles (beetle) =

Scientific classification
- Kingdom: Animalia
- Phylum: Arthropoda
- Clade: Pancrustacea
- Class: Insecta
- Order: Coleoptera
- Suborder: Polyphaga
- Infraorder: Cucujiformia
- Family: Curculionidae
- Genus: Calles; Kissinger, 1964

Genus of beetles

Calles is a genus of hidden snout weevils in the family of beetles known as Curculionidae. There is at least one described species in Calles, C. cladotrichis.
