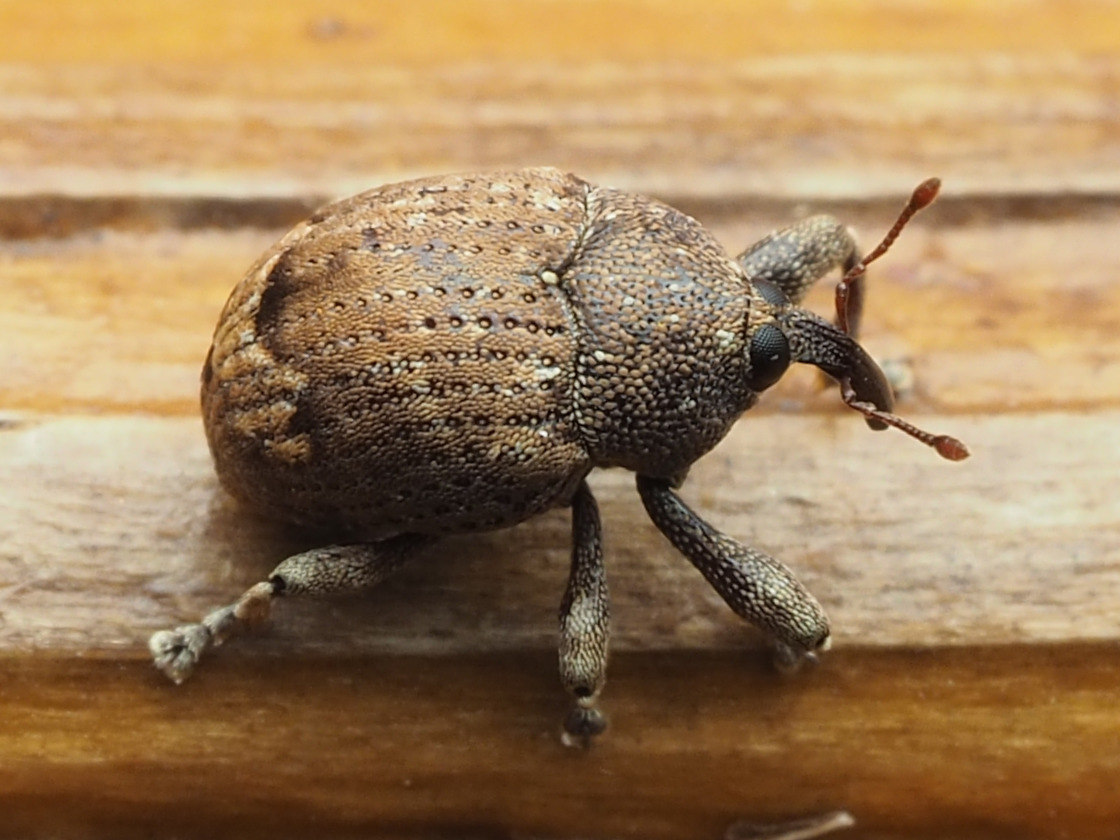
- Pseudomopsis inflata

Scientific classification
- Domain: Eukaryota
- Kingdom: Animalia
- Phylum: Arthropoda
- Class: Insecta
- Order: Coleoptera
- Suborder: Polyphaga
- Infraorder: Cucujiformia
- Family: Curculionidae
- Genus: Pseudomopsis; Champion, 1905

= Pseudomopsis =

Genus of beetles

Pseudomopsis is a genus of hidden snout weevils in the beetle family Curculionidae. There are at least 20 described species in Pseudomopsis.

== Species ==
These 20 species belong to the genus Pseudomopsis:

- Pseudomopsis acuratus Champion, 1905
- Pseudomopsis amoenus Hustache, 1930
- Pseudomopsis arcuatus Champion, 1905
- Pseudomopsis bicristatus Champion, 1905
- Pseudomopsis bolivianus Hustache, 1940
- Pseudomopsis conicicollis Champion, 1905
- Pseudomopsis cribricollis Hustache, 1930
- Pseudomopsis cucubano Wolcott, 1951
- Pseudomopsis distigma Champion, 1905
- Pseudomopsis dufaui Hustache, 1930
- Pseudomopsis gibbus Champion, 1910
- Pseudomopsis inflata (LeConte, 1884)
- Pseudomopsis inflatus Champion, 1905
- Pseudomopsis laticollis Champion, 1905
- Pseudomopsis latisquamis Champion, 1905
- Pseudomopsis mexicanus Hustache, 1936
- Pseudomopsis nigrosignatus Champion, 1905
- Pseudomopsis notaticollis Champion, 1905
- Pseudomopsis peckolti Costa Lima, 1945
- Pseudomopsis similis Champion, 1905
