= Canistes =

Scientific classification
- Kingdom: Animalia
- Phylum: Arthropoda
- Class: Insecta
- Order: Coleoptera
- Suborder: Polyphaga
- Infraorder: Cucujiformia
- Family: Curculionidae
- Genus: Canistes; Casey, 1892

Genus of beetles

Canistes is a genus of hidden snout weevils in the beetle family Curculionidae. There is one described species in Canistes, C. schusteri.
