= Pseudoacalles =

Scientific classification
- Domain: Eukaryota
- Kingdom: Animalia
- Phylum: Arthropoda
- Class: Insecta
- Order: Coleoptera
- Suborder: Polyphaga
- Infraorder: Cucujiformia
- Family: Curculionidae
- Genus: Pseudoacalles; Blatchley, 1916

Genus of beetles

Pseudoacalles is a genus of hidden snout weevils in the beetle family Curculionidae. There are at least three described species in Pseudoacalles.

== Species ==
These three species belong to the genus Pseudoacalles:

- Pseudoacalles maculatus Blatchley, 1920
- Pseudoacalles michalis Blatchley & Leng, 1916
- Pseudoacalles nuchalis (LeConte, 1876)
