= Sudus =

Scientific classification
- Domain: Eukaryota
- Kingdom: Animalia
- Phylum: Arthropoda
- Class: Insecta
- Order: Coleoptera
- Suborder: Polyphaga
- Infraorder: Cucujiformia
- Family: Curculionidae
- Subtribe: Cryptorhynchina
- Genus: Sudus; Kissinger, 1964

Genus of beetles

Sudus is a genus of hidden snout weevils in the beetle family Curculionidae. There is one described species in Sudus, S. floridanus.
