= Liometophilus =

Scientific classification
- Kingdom: Animalia
- Phylum: Arthropoda
- Class: Insecta
- Order: Coleoptera
- Suborder: Polyphaga
- Infraorder: Cucujiformia
- Family: Curculionidae
- Subtribe: Cryptorhynchina
- Genus: Liometophilus; Fall, 1912

Genus of beetles

Liometophilus is a genus of hidden snout weevils in the beetle family Curculionidae. There are at least two described species in Liometophilus.

== Species ==
These two species belong to the genus Liometophilus:

- Liometophilus manni Fall, 1912
- Liometophilus manui Hustache, 1936
