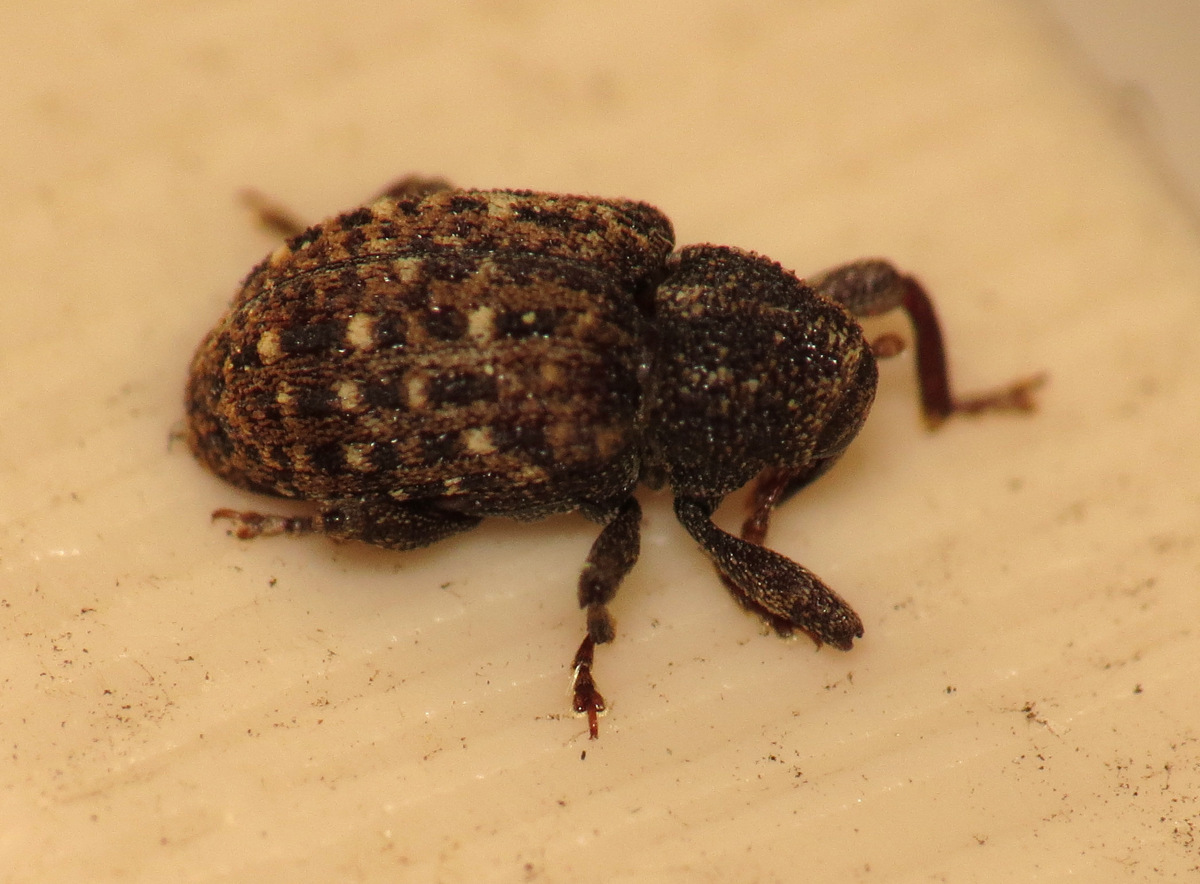
- Apteromechus ferratus

Scientific classification
- Kingdom: Animalia
- Phylum: Arthropoda
- Class: Insecta
- Order: Coleoptera
- Suborder: Polyphaga
- Infraorder: Cucujiformia
- Family: Curculionidae
- Subtribe: Cryptorhynchina
- Genus: Apteromechus; Faust, 1896

= Apteromechus =

Genus of beetles

Apteromechus is a genus of hidden snout weevils in the beetle family Curculionidae. There are more than 20 described species in Apteromechus.

== Species ==
These 23 species belong to the genus Apteromechus:

- Apteromechus debilis Champion, 1906
- Apteromechus deciduus Champion, 1906
- Apteromechus ferratus (Say, 1831)
- Apteromechus flavopunctatus Champion, 1906
- Apteromechus leucospilus Champion, 1906
- Apteromechus longulus Champion, 1906
- Apteromechus longus (LeConte, 1876)
- Apteromechus melanostigma Champion, 1906
- Apteromechus microstictus Fall, 1925
- Apteromechus nitidifrons Champion, 1906
- Apteromechus opacifrons Champion, 1906
- Apteromechus parvus Champion, 1906
- Apteromechus pigmentatus Champion, 1906
- Apteromechus pumilus (Boheman, 1837)
- Apteromechus punctiventris Champion, 1906
- Apteromechus rugipectus Champion, 1906
- Apteromechus rugirostris Champion, 1906
- Apteromechus rugulifrons Champion, 1906
- Apteromechus scabrosus Champion, 1906
- Apteromechus stigmosus Champion, 1906
- Apteromechus subfasciatus Champion, 1906
- Apteromechus suffrago Faust, 1896
- Apteromechus texanus Fall, 1925
