= Lembodes =

Scientific classification
- Kingdom: Animalia
- Phylum: Arthropoda
- Class: Insecta
- Order: Coleoptera
- Suborder: Polyphaga
- Infraorder: Cucujiformia
- Family: Curculionidae
- Genus: Lembodes; Schönherr, 1844

Genus of beetles

Lembodes is a genus of hidden snout weevils in the beetle family Curculionidae. There are about eight described species in Lembodes.

== Species ==
These eight species belong to the genus Lembodes:

- Lembodes albosignatus Chevrolat, 1879
- Lembodes arachnipes Chevrolat, 1880
- Lembodes furcicollis Chevrolat, 1879
- Lembodes nocturnus Chevrolat, 1880
- Lembodes solitarius Boheman, 1844
- Lembodes subcostatus Van Dyke, 1953
- Lembodes trux Champion, 1905
- Lembodes ulula Chevrolat, 1879
