= Faustinus (beetle) =

Scientific classification
- Kingdom: Animalia
- Phylum: Arthropoda
- Clade: Pancrustacea
- Class: Insecta
- Order: Coleoptera
- Suborder: Polyphaga
- Infraorder: Cucujiformia
- Family: Curculionidae
- Genus: Faustinus; Berg, 1898

Genus of beetles

Faustinus is a genus of hidden snout weevils in the family of beetles known as Curculionidae. There is at least one described species in Faustinus, F. cubae.
