= Rhynchus apiculatus =

Scientific classification
- Kingdom: Animalia
- Phylum: Arthropoda
- Clade: Pancrustacea
- Class: Insecta
- Order: Coleoptera
- Suborder: Polyphaga
- Infraorder: Cucujiformia
- Family: Curculionidae
- Genus: Rhynchus; Kissinger, 1964
- Species: R. apiculatus

Binomial name
- Rhynchus apiculatus Kissinger, 1964

Species of beetle

Rhynchus apiculatus is a species of hidden snout weevil in the family Curculionidae. it is in the monotypic genus Rhynchus.

== Etymology ==
ῥύγχος = snout
