= Eubulus (beetle) =

Scientific classification
- Kingdom: Animalia
- Phylum: Arthropoda
- Class: Insecta
- Order: Coleoptera
- Suborder: Polyphaga
- Infraorder: Cucujiformia
- Family: Curculionidae
- Subtribe: Cryptorhynchina
- Genus: Eubulus; Kirsch, 1870

Diversity
- at least 200 species

Genus of beetles

Eubulus is a genus of hidden snout weevils in the family of beetles known as Curculionidae. There are at least 200 described species in Eubulus.

== See also ==
- List of Eubulus species
