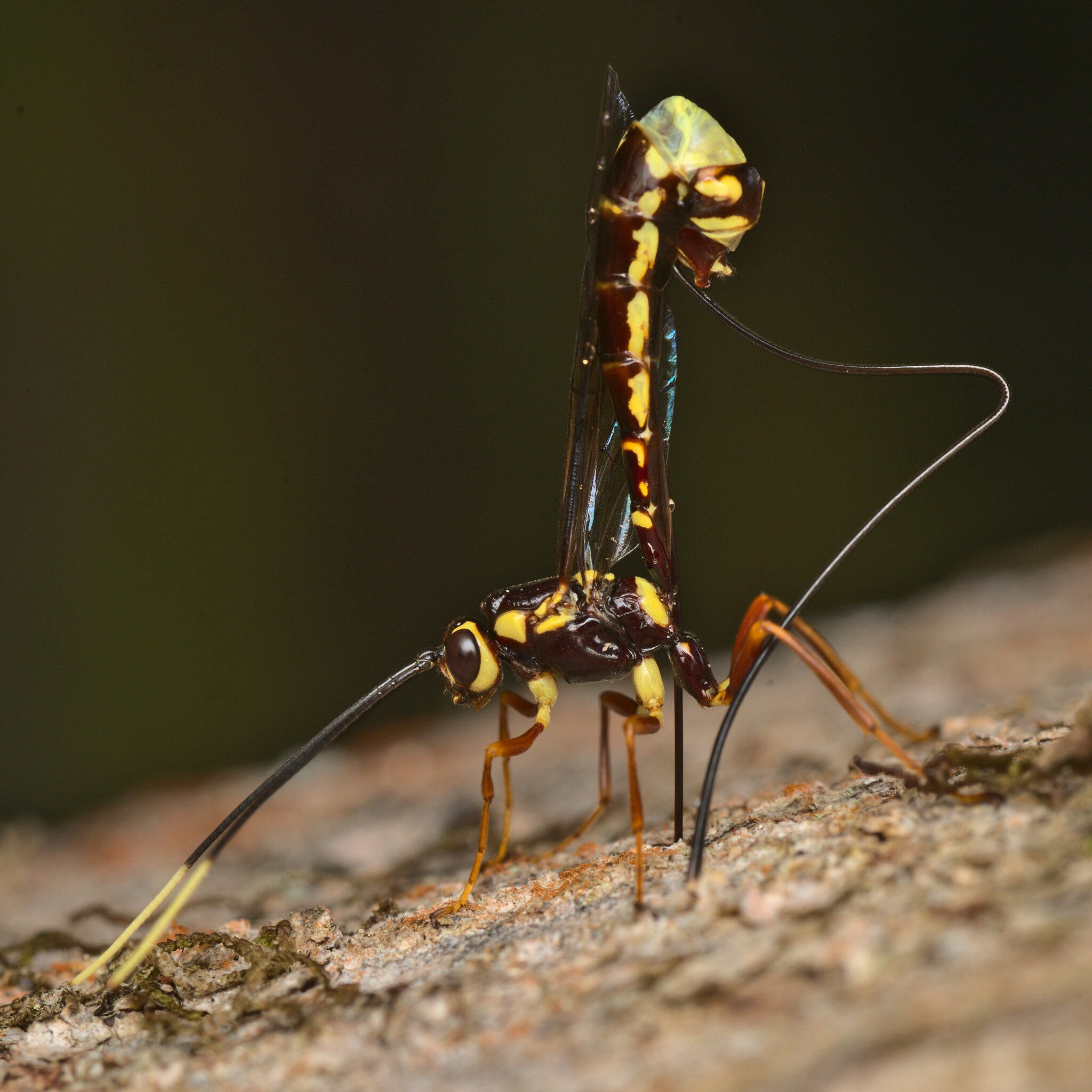
- A female Certonotus fractinervis wasp

Scientific classification
- Kingdom: Animalia
- Phylum: Arthropoda
- Clade: Pancrustacea
- Class: Insecta
- Order: Hymenoptera
- Family: Ichneumonidae
- Genus: Certonotus
- Species: C. fractinervis

Binomial name
- Certonotus fractinervis (Vollenhoven, 1873)

= Certonotus fractinervis =

Species of wasp

Certonotus fractinervis is New Zealand's largest native wasp and it is one of two species of Labeninae in New Zealand. It is a parasitic wasp that parasitizes Rhynchodes ursus.

== Description ==
Certonotus fractinervis is a slender, long ichneumon wasp. Certonotus fractinervis is a part of the subfamily Labeninae. A closely related species of the Labeninae family is suggested to be Poecilocryptus zealandicus. Species in the Labeninae family can be identified from other Ichneumonidae because they have their metasoma, the posterior part of the body, located high on the propodeum, the first abdominal segment. Certonotus fractinervis has a larger body size than P. zealandicus. The female has a body length of 27 millimeters, forewing length of 20 millimeters, antennae length of 19 millimeters, and a long ovipositor with a length of 35 millimeters. Certonotus fractinervis can be distinguished by the bright yellow spots that go down the center of the metasoma as well as the apical white ends of the antennae, about a third of the way up. The head of the insect is yellow with two parallel streaks of brown from the base of the antennae to the clypeus. The clypeus, the broad plate of the insect in front of the “face”, is a yellow brown and the mandibles are a darker brown. The mesonotum, the top plate of the second thoracic segment, is striated or wrinkled, not smooth, which is another feature that can help distinguish between closely related species. The thorax is dark brown, the upper sections of the prothorax, sub alar ridge, tegula, scutellum are yellow. The femur and tibiae are brown, the tarsi are a yellowish brown, the stigma and veins are black. The ovipositor consists of three strands. The male is similar to the female; however, the face of the male is typically completely yellow, and the topmost half of the first abdominal segment is also yellow. The male abdomen is narrower and the tergites are more elongated. The first tergite has a band of yellow while the rest of the tergites are brown with a bit of yellow in the middle of the tergite.

== Range ==
=== Natural global range ===
Certonotus fractinervis is endemic to New Zealand.

=== New Zealand range ===
Certonotus fractinervis was first described by Vollenhoven in 1873 from a female specimen in New Zealand. This species has been found in several localities of native forest in both the South and North Islands of New Zealand. Some of these locations include Creswell Sounds, South Westland, Southland, Canterbury; Certonotus fractinervis has been found in elevations of 3,600 feet in Mt Arthur and Mt Peel at 5,000 feet.

== Habitat ==
Certonotus fractinervis has been found in a range of locations across the North and South Islands of New Zealand, particularly in the natural native forests. Certonotus fractinervis lays its eggs inside of the larvae of the elephant weevil, Rhynchodes ursus. The wasp would likely be found near kauri and southern beech trees, where R. ursus preferentially lays its eggs. Certonotus fractinervis (formerly, Rhyssa fractinervis) has been reported to be found in Pinus radiata plantations, which is not the typical habitat of C. fractinervis as they rely on beech for their weevil host. A paper suggests that the ichneumonid wasp may have broadened its host range to an introduced wood-boring wasp, Sirex noctilio, because S. noctilio lays its eggs in pine trees. Despite this, there is no known evidence of C. fractinervis being a hyperparasite.

== Ecology ==
=== Life cycle and phenology ===
The life cycle of Certonotus fractinervis is greatly dependent on the life cycle of the elephant weevil, Rhynchodes ursus, as C. factinervis parasitizes the larvae of R. ursus. The elephant weevil lays its eggs in dead branches or trunks of kauri, southern beech, and mountain beech trees. The larvae are wood boring and make tunnels in the dead wood. Rhynchodes ursus visits beech trees in the autumn which could suggest that larvae overwinter in wood during colder months and emerge when the environment is warmer. Certonotus fractinervis may follow a similar pattern with the timing of the weevil larvae, laying their eggs in Autumn. After determining a suitable spot, an adult female wasp will drill its ovipositor, a tubelike organ used for the depositing of eggs, into a dead beech tree to lay its eggs in the larvae of the elephant weevil. During boring, the wasp arches its abdomen high, nearly standing on its head, and the two strands that cover the ovipositor are lifted above the abdomen. The ovipositor is rapidly driven into the wood and the wasp utilizes feelers to smell the presence of weevil larva. An observation was noted that a sac stuck out of the abdomen at the start of the ovipositor during the bore, potentially to release a liquid to help penetrate the wood to get to the weevil larvae or it could be a rupture of the abdomen. When the wasp egg hatches, the larvae will feed on and consume the live larval host. The wasp larva will then form a pupa and eventually form into an adult wasp. The female ichneumonid wasps spend a majority of their time looking for a host tree while male wasps will likely search for newly emerging adult females.

=== Diet and foraging ===
Native parasitic wasps play an important role in keeping populations of other insects in check. Certonotus fractinervis parasitizes Rhynchodes ursus larvae. The larvae stages of C. fractinervis rely on the larval host, R. ursus for enough nutrition to form a pupa. Adult ichneumonid wasps are known to feed on different food sources such as plant sap, nectar, and honeydew produced by other insects. A male C. fractinervis has also been spotted feeding on a droplet on the surface of a fungal fruiting body, Cyttaria nigra.

=== Predators, parasites and diseases ===
There are no found sources that suggest any predators, parasites, or diseases specific to Certonotus fractinervis. The native wasp may face challenges if the population of the native Rhynchodes ursus starts to see a decline, since R. ursus is the only known host for C. fractinervis. Important threats to native biodiversity in New Zealand include habitat loss and fragmentation. This impacts the forest trees, such as beech, that R. ursus relies on, thus, affecting C. fractinervis. Certonotus fractinervis is more confined to native forest, so any destruction of those natural areas could pose a threat to the ichneumonid wasp. Though not a notable issue for C. fractinervis specifically, some native species have to compete with introduced invasive species such as birds, rats, and other invertebrates that might feed on their specific and only host, in this case, the elephant weevil. There are no found sources that suggest that C. fractinervis faces these concerns in the wild.
