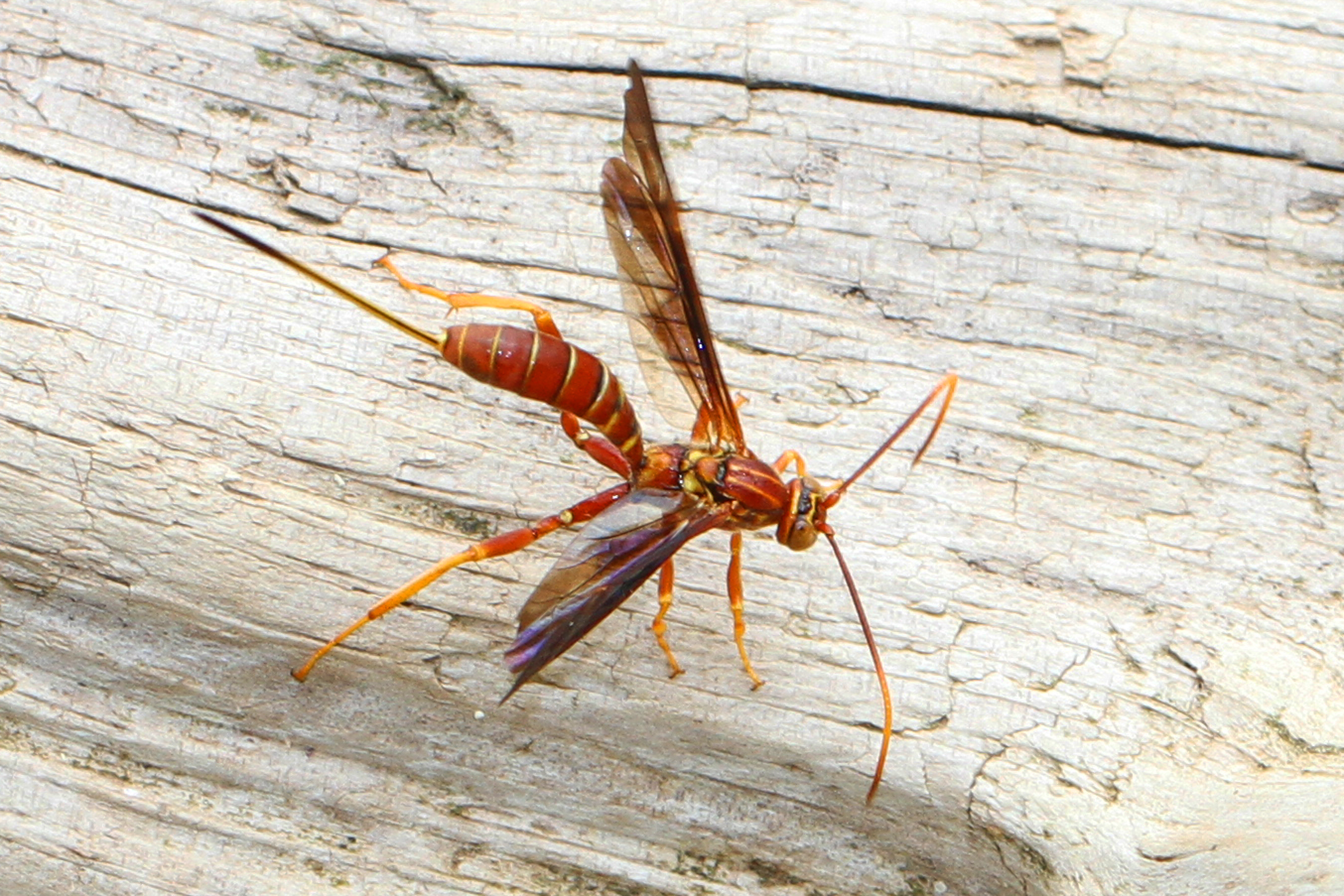

Scientific classification
- Kingdom: Animalia
- Phylum: Arthropoda
- Class: Insecta
- Order: Hymenoptera
- Family: Ichneumonidae
- Genus: Labena
- Species: L. grallator

Binomial name
- Labena grallator (Say, 1835)

= Labena grallator =

Species of wasp

Labena grallator is a species of ichneumon wasp in the family Ichneumonidae. It is a parasitoid of wood-boring beetle larvae, including Chrysobothris femorata larvae as well as Callidiellum rufipenne pupae.
