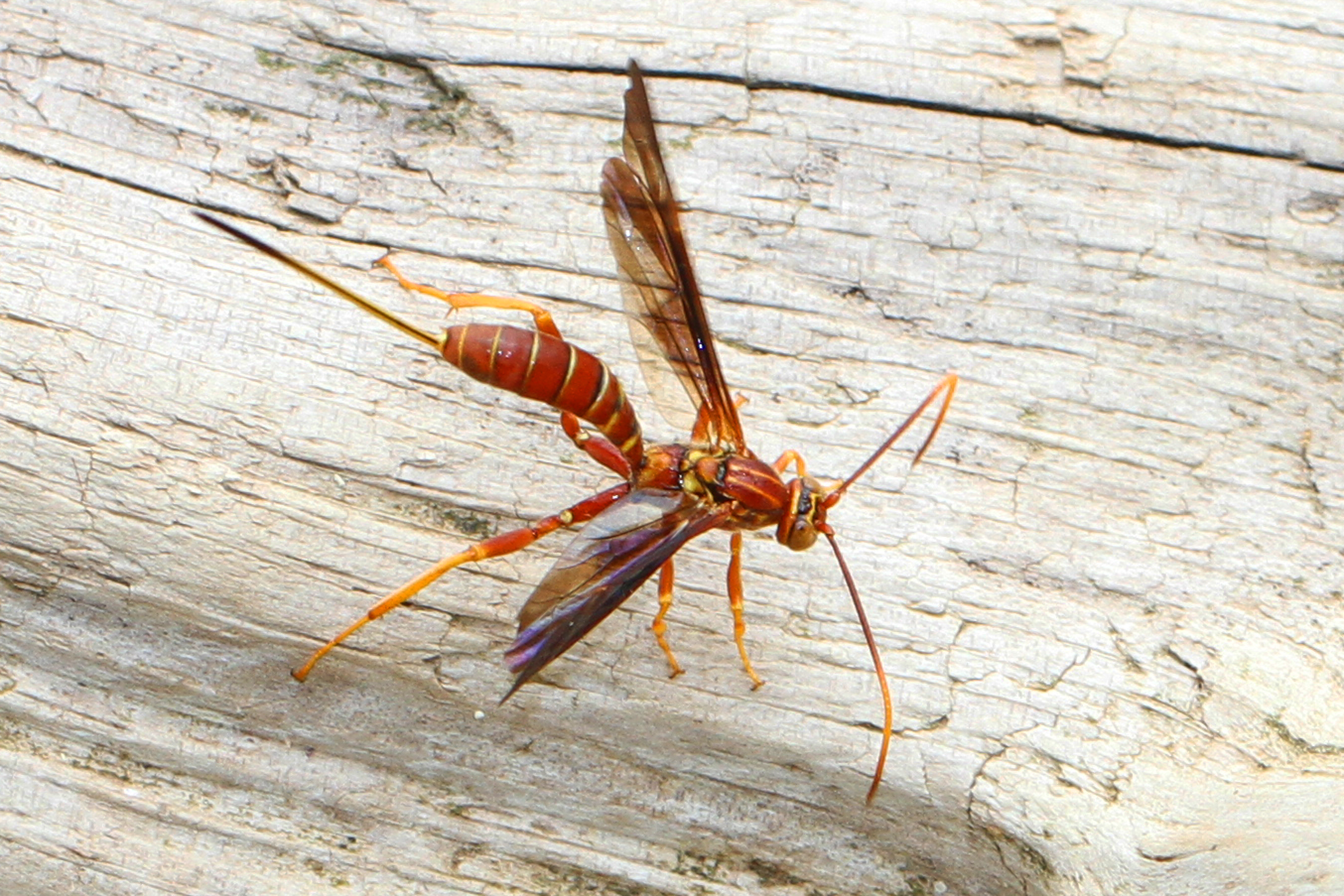
- Labena grallator

Scientific classification
- Kingdom: Animalia
- Phylum: Arthropoda
- Class: Insecta
- Order: Hymenoptera
- Family: Ichneumonidae
- Subfamily: Labeninae
- Genus: Labena; Cresson, 1864

= Labena =

Genus of wasps

Labena is a genus of ichneumon wasps in the family Ichneumonidae. There are at least 40 described species in Labena.

== Species ==
These 42 species belong to the genus Labena:

- Labena annulata (Brulle, 1846)^{c}
- Labena canelensis Porter, 2005^{c g}
- Labena chadwickii (Parrott, 1955)^{c g}
- Labena delta Gauld, 2000^{c g}
- Labena eremica Gauld, 2000^{c g}
- Labena espinita Gauld, 2000^{c g}
- Labena fiorii Graf & Marzagao, 1999^{c g}
- Labena flavatoria (Fabricius, 1804)^{c g}
- Labena gloriosa Cresson, 1874^{c g}
- Labena grallator (Say, 1835)^{c g b}
- Labena grandis Gauld & Holloway, 1986^{c g}
- Labena guanacasteca Gauld, 2000^{c g}
- Labena humida Gauld, 2000^{c g}
- Labena jacunda Gauld & Holloway, 1986^{c g}
- Labena keira Gauld & Holloway, 1986^{c g}
- Labena lachryma Gauld, 2000^{c g}
- Labena littoralis González-Moreno & Bordera, 2015^{g}
- Labena madoricola Gonzalez-Moreno & Bordera, 2015^{g}
- Labena malecasta Gauld & Holloway, 1986^{c g}
- Labena marginata Szepligeti, 1914^{c g}
- Labena mimica Gauld, 2000^{c g}
- Labena moragai Gauld, 2000^{c g}
- Labena morda Gauld, 2000^{c g}
- Labena nigra Rohwer, 1920^{c g}
- Labena obscura Gauld, 2000^{c g}
- Labena ogra Gauld, 2000^{c g}
- Labena osai Gauld, 2000^{c g}
- Labena petita Gauld, 2000^{c g}
- Labena pluvia Gauld, 2000^{c g}
- Labena polemica Gauld, 2000^{c g}
- Labena pucon Porter, 2005^{c g}
- Labena pudenda Gauld & Holloway, 1986^{c g}
- Labena rufa (Brulle, 1846)^{c}
- Labena schausi Cushman, 1922^{c g}
- Labena sericea (Kriechbaumer, 1890)^{c g}
- Labena striata Townes, 1966^{c g}
- Labena tarsata Gauld, 2000^{c g}
- Labena tekalina Gonzalez-Moreno & Bordera, 2015^{g}
- Labena tinctipennis Rohwer, 1920^{c g b}
- Labena trilineata Ashmead, 1895^{c g}
- Labena variegata Szepligeti, 1914^{c g}
- Labena zerita Gauld, 2000^{c g}

Data sources: i = ITIS, c = Catalogue of Life, g = GBIF, b = Bugguide.net
