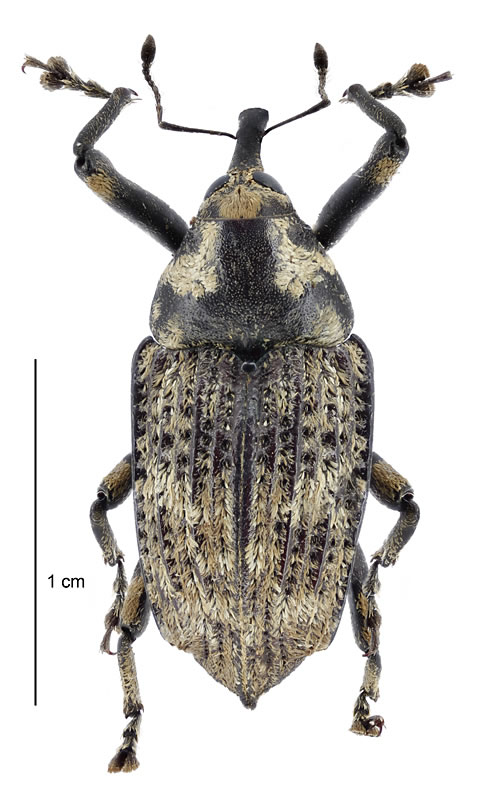
- Dorsal view of a specimen of Rhynchodes ursus

Scientific classification
- Kingdom: Animalia
- Phylum: Arthropoda
- Class: Insecta
- Order: Coleoptera
- Suborder: Polyphaga
- Infraorder: Cucujiformia
- Family: Curculionidae
- Subfamily: Cryptorhynchinae
- Genus: Rhynchodes; White, 1846

= Rhynchodes =

Genus of beetles

Rhynchodes is a genus of beetles belonging to the family Curculionidae. They are restricted to New Zealand and New Caledonia.

== List of species ==
There are ten species:

- Rhynchodes alboguttatus
- Rhynchode ater
- Rhynchodes eloini
- Rhynchodes falleni
- Rhynchodes jekeli
- Rhynchodes rubipunctatus
- Rhynchodes saundersii
- Rhynchodes squameus
- Rhynchodes ursus
- Rhynchodes weberi
