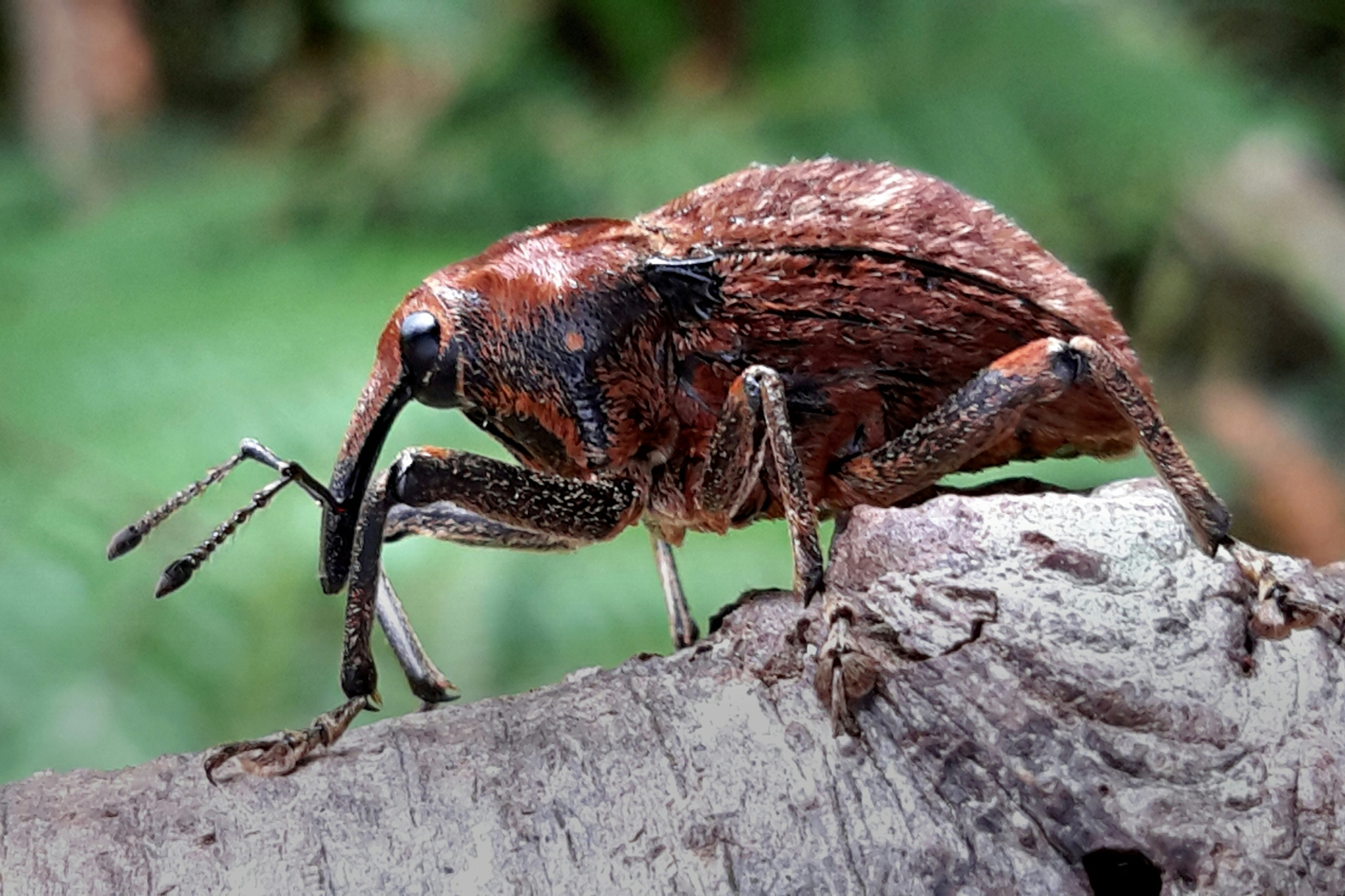

Scientific classification
- Domain: Eukaryota
- Kingdom: Animalia
- Phylum: Arthropoda
- Class: Insecta
- Order: Coleoptera
- Suborder: Polyphaga
- Infraorder: Cucujiformia
- Family: Curculionidae
- Genus: Rhynchodes
- Species: R. ursus

Binomial name
- Rhynchodes ursus White, 1846

= Rhynchodes ursus =

Species of beetle

Rhynchodes ursus, also known as the elephant weevil, is a weevil in the Curculionidae family. It is endemic to New Zealand. It is a wood-boring weevil found throughout New Zealand.

== Taxonomy ==
This species was first described by Adam White in 1846.

== Description ==
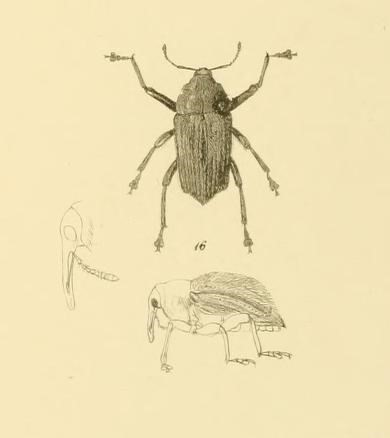
R. ursus illustration

The adults of this species were originally described by White as follows:

Deep brown; the thorax with two longitudinal bands of a lighter colour near the side; elytra above with five rows of hairs, on each side of which is a row of very deep punctures, between every two of which is a smoothish ridge; across the elytra are two obscure, dark brown bands; legs black, femora above at the end with a spot of yellowish brown hairs; abdomen beneath with the last segment having two tufts of hair.
Length, 10 1/2 lines.

This large weevil has a deep brown colour with two lighter bands near the side of its thorax. It has black legs with a spot of yellowish-brown hairs on each femur. It has dense scales on its body, which can be hair-like. In female specimens the antennae are inserted halfway along the rostrum and nearer the front in males. This species varies greatly in size, colour, and in the amount and nature of its hair-like scales. Male specimens are covered with short scale-like hairs, whilst females have longer, deep brown, or grey, longer more shaggy scale-like hairs. Old individuals are occasionally met with quite black and shining, and almost destitute of any scales whatsoever.

The larvae of R. ursus can be distinguished from other weevil larvae as it is large in size and has broad rounded ends to its premedial plates on its exoskeleton.

== Distribution ==
This species is endemic to New Zealand and is found throughout the country.

== Behaviour ==
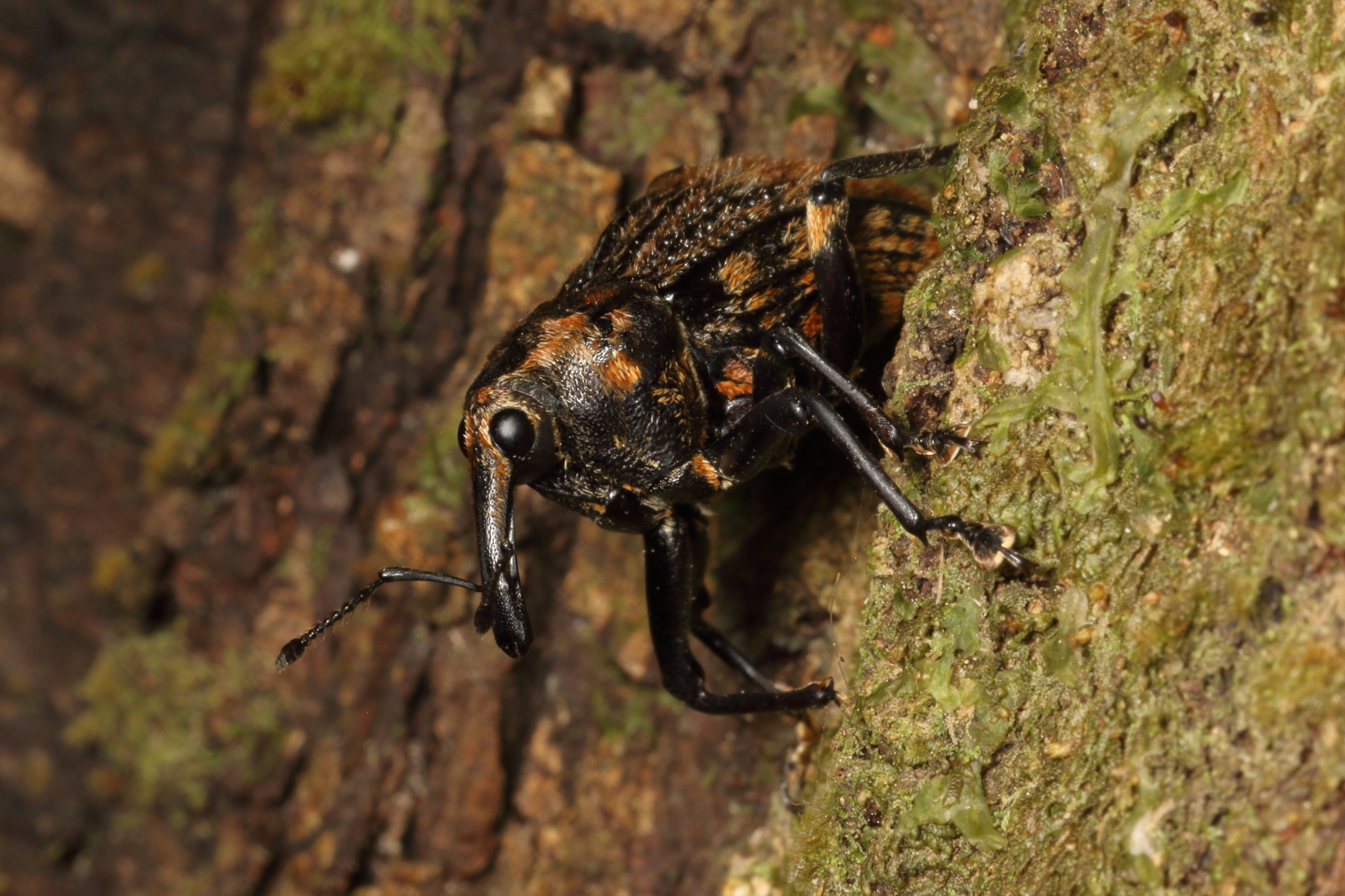
R. ursus at night

This species is active at night and is able to fly.

== Hosts ==
Adult weevils are found on trees, where they gather to feed on sap. Larvae tunnel into dead trunks and branches of southern beeches, rimu and Dracophyllum traversii.

== Parasites ==
The larvae of R. ursus are the host of New Zealand's largest parasitic wasp, Certonotus fractinervis. Female wasps use a long ovipositor to lay eggs inside the larvae whilst those larvae develop inside trees.
