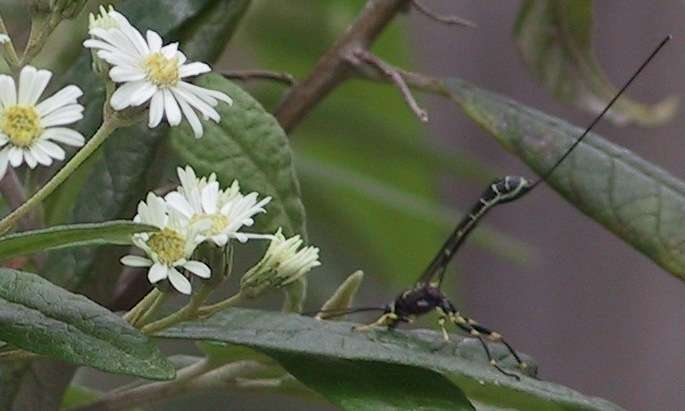
- A Certonotus nitidulus wasp on a leaf

Scientific classification
- Kingdom: Animalia
- Phylum: Arthropoda
- Clade: Pancrustacea
- Class: Insecta
- Order: Hymenoptera
- Family: Ichneumonidae
- Genus: Certonotus
- Species: C. nitidulus

Binomial name
- Certonotus nitidulus Morley, 1913

Synonyms
- Certonotus tasmaniensis Turner, 1919

= Certonotus nitidulus =

Species of wasp

Certonotus nitidulus is a parasitic wasp found in Australia in New South Wales, Queensland, and Victoria, as well as on Lord Howe Island.
