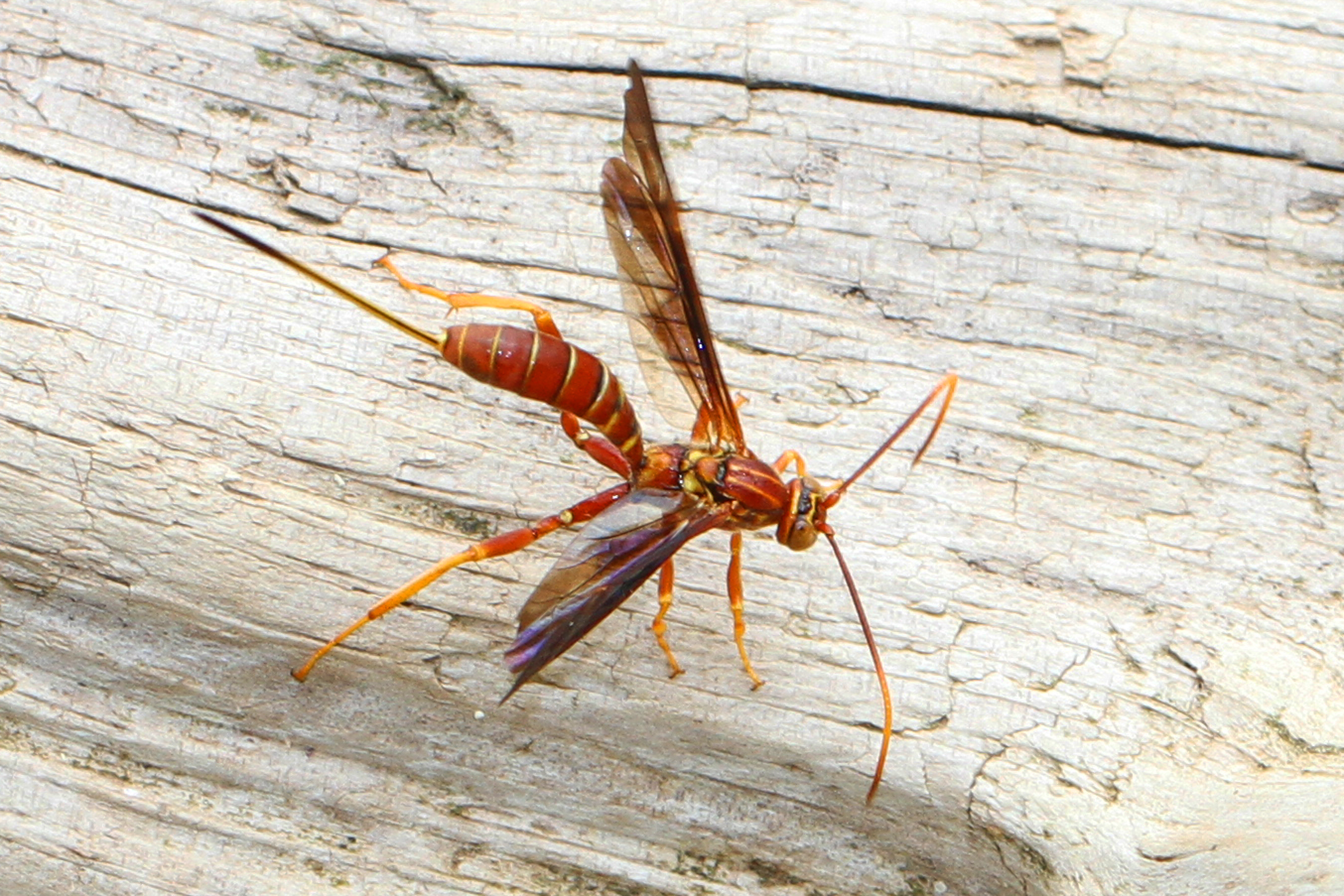
- Labena grallator, Virginia

Scientific classification
- Kingdom: Animalia
- Phylum: Arthropoda
- Clade: Pancrustacea
- Class: Insecta
- Order: Hymenoptera
- Family: Ichneumonidae
- Subfamily: Labeninae; Ashmead,1900

Tribes
- Groteini; Labenini; Poecilocryptini; Xenothyrini

= Labeninae =

Subfamily of wasps

The Labeninae is a subfamily within the parasitoid wasp family Ichneumonidae. The family is divided into 12 extant genera grouped within four tribes.

== Distribution ==
Labeninae are predominantly found in Australia and South America. A few species of Labena and Grotea are found in North America. Research suggests that the family originated on Gondwana before the break-off of Australia.

== Biology ==
Some species from the tribe Labenini have been reared from wood-boring beetles of the Coleopteran families Buprestidae, Cerambycidae, and Curculionidae. Members of the tribe Groteini parasitize solitary bees; Labium wasps are known to parasitise ground-nesting, solitary bees, while Grotea are known parasitoids of cavity-nesting, solitary bees. Species of Poecilocryptus are thought to be phytophagous, due to adaptations of the larval head capsule. However, as with much of the Ichneumonidae, knowledge of many labenine species' ecology, biology, and evolution is extremely limited or completely lacking.

== Genera ==
These genera belong to the subfamily Labeninae:

=== Tribe Groteini ===
- Grotea Cresson, 1864^{c g b}
- Labium Brullé, 1846^{c g}
- Ozlabium Gauld & Wahl, 2000^{c g}

=== Tribe Labenini ===
- Apechoneura Kriechbaumer, 1890^{c g}
- Certonotus Kriechbaumer, 1889^{c g}
- Gauldianus Lanfranco, 2000^{c g}
- Labena Cresson, 1864^{c g b}
- Torquinsha Gauld & Wahl, 2000^{c g}

=== Tribe Poecilocryptini ===
- Alaothyris Gauld, 1984^{c g}
- Poecilocryptus Cameron, 1901^{c g}
- Urancyla Gauld, 1984^{c g}

=== Tribe Xenothyrini ===
- Xenothyris Townes, 1969^{c g}

Data sources: i = ITIS, c = Catalogue of Life, g = GBIF, b = Bugguide.net
