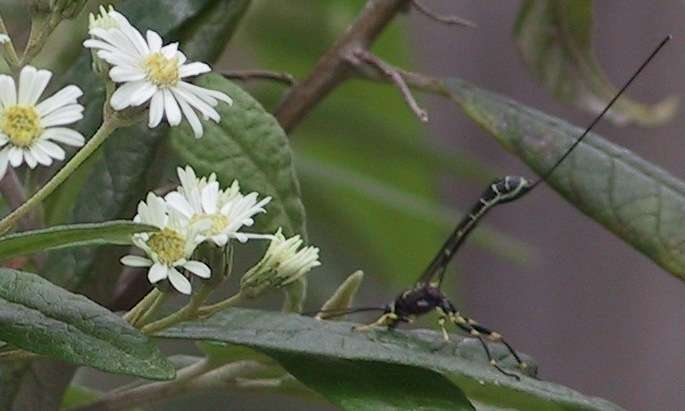
- Certonotus nitidulus on a leaf

Scientific classification
- Kingdom: Animalia
- Phylum: Arthropoda
- Class: Insecta
- Order: Hymenoptera
- Family: Ichneumonidae
- Genus: Certonotus; Kriechbaumer, 1889

= Certonotus =

Genus of wasps

Certonotus is a genus of wasps in the family Ichneumonidae.

Certonotus nitidulus have been used in the biocontrol of Sirex noctilio in Tasmania. Other species have been considered in Chile.

== Species ==
There are 31 recognized species:

- Certonotus andrewi Gauld & Holloway, 1986
- Certonotus annulatus Morley, 1913
- Certonotus apicalis Morley, 1913
- Certonotus avitus Gauld & Holloway, 1986
- Certonotus celeus Gauld & Holloway, 1986
- Certonotus cestus Gauld & Holloway, 1986
- Certonotus farrugiai Gauld & Holloway, 1986
- Certonotus flaviceps (Vollenhoven, 1879)
- Certonotus fractinervis (Vollenhoven, 1873)
- Certonotus geniculatus Morley, 1913
- Certonotus hinnuleus Krieger, 1901
- Certonotus humeralifer Krieger, 1901
- Certonotus ixion Gauld & Holloway, 1986
- Certonotus leeuwinensis Turner, 1919
- Certonotus lorentzi Cameron, 1911
- Certonotus mogimbensis Cheesman, 1936
- Certonotus monticola Morley, 1913
- Certonotus nitidulus Morley, 1913
- Certonotus paluma Gauld & Holloway, 1986
- Certonotus pineus Gauld & Holloway, 1986
- Certonotus rufescens Morley, 1913
- Certonotus rufipes Cameron, 1911
- Certonotus rufus Mocsary, 1905
- Certonotus seminiger Krieger, 1901
- Certonotus similis Krieger, 1901
- Certonotus sisyphus Gauld & Holloway, 1986
- Certonotus talus Gauld & Holloway, 1986
- Certonotus toolangi Gauld & Holloway, 1986
- Certonotus varius Kriechbaumer, 1889
- Certonotus vestigator (Smith, 1858)
- Certonotus zebrus Gauld & Holloway, 1986
