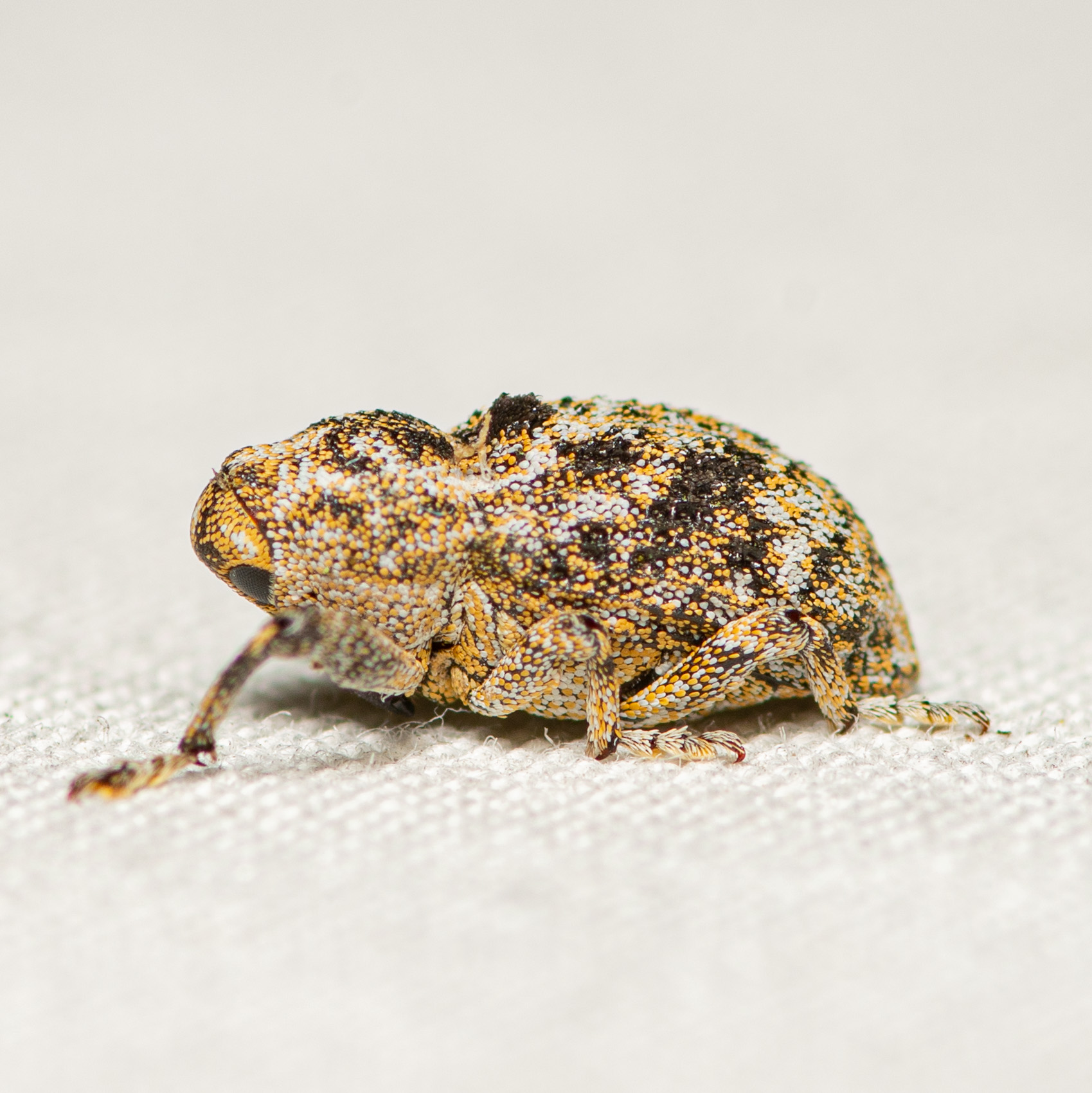
- Episcirrus brachialis

Scientific classification
- Domain: Eukaryota
- Kingdom: Animalia
- Phylum: Arthropoda
- Class: Insecta
- Order: Coleoptera
- Suborder: Polyphaga
- Infraorder: Cucujiformia
- Family: Curculionidae
- Genus: Episcirrus
- Species: E. brachialis

Binomial name
- Episcirrus brachialis (LeConte, 1884)

Synonyms
- Neogasterocercus vandykei Sleeper, 1962

= Episcirrus brachialis =

Species of beetle

Episcirrus brachialis is a species of hidden snout weevil in the beetle family Curculionidae. It is found in North America.
