= Episcirrus =

Scientific classification
- Domain: Eukaryota
- Kingdom: Animalia
- Phylum: Arthropoda
- Class: Insecta
- Order: Coleoptera
- Suborder: Polyphaga
- Infraorder: Cucujiformia
- Family: Curculionidae
- Tribe: Gasterocercini
- Genus: Episcirrus; Kuschel, 1958

Genus of beetles

Episcirrus is a genus of hidden snout weevils in the beetle family Curculionidae. There are at least four described species in Episcirrus.

== Species ==
These four species belong to the genus Episcirrus:

- Episcirrus brachialis (LeConte, 1884)
- Episcirrus isolepus Poinar & Legalov, 2014
- Episcirrus propugnator Kuschel, 1958
- Episcirrus singularis (Chevrolat, 1880)
